= Children Without Worms =

Health campaign

Children Without Worms (CWW) is a program of the Task Force for Global Health aiming for the eradication of worm infections (helminthiases), specifically targeting children. CWW works with the World Health Organization, national Ministries of Health, nongovernmental organizations and private-public coalitions such as Uniting to Combat NTDs. It acts as an intermediary for the pharmaceutical company Johnson and Johnson in distributing the latter's mebendazole for mass deworming of children to reduce or end soil-transmitted helminthiasis.

Rubina Imtiaz is the Director of CWW.

== Background ==
Soil-transmitted helminthiasis is a neglected tropical disease as a result of infection of intestinal parasites such as roundworm (Ascaris lumbricoides), whipworm (Trichuris trichiura), hookworms (Ancylostoma duodenale and Necator americanus), and pinworm/threadworm (Strongyloides stercoralis). Most prevalent in the tropical and subtropical regions of Subsaharan Africa, Latin America, Southeast Asia and China, the disease is an enormous burden on humanity, amounting to 135,000 deaths every year, and persistent infection of more than two billion people. The long-term impact is even worse. In these regions, the disease is the single most debilitating cause of intellectual and physical disability. Thus it remains a relentless factor in poor socio-economic growth and human development.

In 2012, the World Health Organization convened a meeting at London. It was headed by Margaret Chan, Director-General of WHO, and Bill Gates, Co-Chair of the Bill & Melinda Gates Foundation. Joined by representatives from the World Bank, major pharmaceutical companies, and governments of US, UK, United Arab Emirates, Bangladesh, Brazil, Mozambique and Tanzania, the meeting approved the London Declaration on Neglected Tropical Diseases. The declaration was meant to be a global collaborative disease eradication programme targeting the control and elimination of tropical diseases.

== History ==
Children Without Worms was established in 2005-2006 as a partnership between Johnson & Johnson and the Task Force for Global Health. The involvement of Johnson and Johnson was in large part for the implementation of the London Declaration. As part of the project, Johnson and Johnson was to donate its mebendazole for the treatment of soil-transmitted helminthiasis.

Johnson and Johnson committed to free distribution of 200 million doses of mebendazole tablets every year until 2020. Initially called the Mebendazole Donation Initiative, CWW was the first program focused exclusively on reducing the burden of soil-transmitted helminth infections in school-age children in Africa, Asia, and Central America. In 2016, the U.S. Food and Drug Administration approved Johnson and Johnson's Vermox Chewable, a mebendazole tablets suitable for children as young as one year of age, and with it the distribution has been extended to babies.

== Objectives ==
CWW's mission is to enhance the health and development of children by reducing intestinal worm infections.

CWW's work focuses on three pillars:

- Country Engagement: support and build the capacity of national deworming programs to ensure effective and efficient delivery of interventions.
- Partnerships and Advocacy: support effective partnerships with stakeholders to accelerate STH control efforts in endemic countries and disseminate preferred practices in program management, and evaluation.
- Technical Leadership: provide scientific leadership to advocate for evidence-based approaches for the control of intestinal worm infections.

== Works and achievements ==
From 2006, CWW agreed to manage the deworming medicine donations from Johnson & Johnson and GlaxoSmithKline for soil-transmitted helminthiasis (STH). From 2007 to 201, CWW's strategy focussed on drug donation to country engagement, partnerships and advocacy. In the first mass deworming programme involving CWW, one million Ethiopean children were given mebendazole in 2007, and since 2013 annual mass deworming reached six million. 14 endemic countries were covered during the first phase up to 2012.

Since 2016, CWW has provided technical support to the Ministry of Health in Bangladesh to strengthen their deworming program and continues to engage with countries like Kenya to strengthen their deworming efforts.

CWW serves as the secretariat for the Soil-Transmitted Helminthiasis Advisory Committee and the STH Coalition. STHAC is group of researchers in tropical medicine and diseases, and is a body that monitors annual activities and achievements in global deworming programmes. It includes scientists experts in Neglected Tropical Diseases, parasitology, epidemiology, child health, and education who convene once a year over two days to provide technical and scientific advice on STH control to national programs, researchers, funders and pharmaceutical donors to improve STH control efforts globally.

The STH Coalition was established in 2014 to bring together a cross-sectoral group of partners to accelerate efforts to control STH worldwide. With over 60 members, the STH Coalition members work together on advocacy, resource mobilization, monitoring and evaluation, policy analysis and research to scale-up deworming efforts in endemic communities around the world.

CWW's funding mainly comes from Johnson & Johnson and GlaxoSmithKline. It continued to participate in epidemiological research on helminthiasis and anthelmintic treatment programme.
