= Neglected diseases =

Neglected diseases may refer to:

- Neglected tropical diseases
- Rare diseases and orphan diseases
