= Lorenzo Savioli =

Lorenzo Savioli is a researcher who served as the director of the Department of Control of Neglected Tropical Diseases at the World Health Organization Headquarters in Geneva, Switzerland from 2005 until his retirement in 2014.

An Italian national, he holds a medical doctor degree (1977), and two specializations (in tropical medicine, 1979 and in infectious diseases, 1985) from the University of Rome "La Sapienza". He further pursued his studies in the United Kingdom where he obtained a Master's degree in medical parasitology from the London School of Hygiene and Tropical Medicine and the Diploma in Tropical Medicine and Hygiene from the Royal College of Physicians.

In 1979 he moved to Zanzibar, Tanzania where he worked as a clinician and later as the public health officer responsible for controlling schistosomiasis and soil-transmitted helminthiasis on Pemba island. In 1991 he joined the United Nations and was assigned to the World Health Organization Headquarters in Geneva, where he led the "Programme on Intestinal Parasitic Infections", the "Schistosomiasis and Intestinal Parasites Unit" and the "Parasitic Diseases and Vector Control Unit". In 2005 he was appointed director of the newly constituted "Department of Control of Neglected Tropical Diseases".

The recipient of several awards and distinctions, Savioli is a senior associate at the Johns Hopkins Bloomberg School of Public Health. He is a Fellow of the Islamic World Academy of Sciences.
