= Unlimit Health =

Organisation working to end parasitic disease

- Logo for Unlimit Health.
- Company type: Non-profit
- Founded: 2002; 24 years ago
- Headquarters: Edinburgh House, 170 Kennington Lane, London, England
- Number of employees: 30
- Website: unlimithealth.org

Unlimit Health (previously known as SCI Foundation and as the Schistosomiasis Control Initiative) is an international organisation working to end parasitic disease. The organisation partners with affected countries, sharing evidence and expertise to eliminate preventable infections, through technical and financial support to ministries of health, in line with their strategies and plans, to strengthen health systems within affected communities.

Unlimit Health's area of focus is the elimination of schistosomiasis and soil-transmitted helminthiases (intestinal worms). The detrimental effects of parasitic worms include internal organ damage, impaired child development, increased risk of HIV in women and infertility.

Unlimit Health engages in global and regional forums that aim to tackle parasitic infections, providing technical expertise to global bodies such as the World Health Organization (WHO). It has been granted the status of Independent Research Organisation (IRO) by UK Research and Innovation (UKRI), the UK body responsible for supporting research, knowledge exchange and innovation.

The organisation's strategy 2023–2028 is aligned with the three pillars of the WHO road map for neglected tropical diseases, enabling a stronger focus on programmatic action, cross-cutting approaches, and country ownership.

== History ==
The organisation was founded in 2002 by Professor Alan Fenwick OBE with a £20m grant from the Bill and Melinda Gates Foundation, and started life as a research group, the Schistosomiasis Control Initiative, within Imperial College London under the leadership of Professor Fenwick and Professor Joanne Webster as co-directors. The grant allowed them to provide a proof-of-concept for national-scale schistosomiasis programmes.

Consistently ranked globally as one of the most cost-effective non-profit initiatives, the organisation has received significant funding since its inception including from the Foreign, Commonwealth and Development Office (formerly the UK Department of International Development (DFID)), USAID and philanthropic investors.

In 2006, the SCI was a founding partner of the Global Network for Neglected Tropical Diseases, which promoted integration of control or elimination programmes against seven neglected tropical diseases (NTDs).

By 2007, the SCI had facilitated delivery of approximately 40 million treatments of praziquantel against schistosomiasis, and many more deworming doses of albendazole.

In 2010, SCI expanded its reach after the award of the management of ICOSA - a programme funded by the Department for International Development (DFID).

In April 2013, SCI announced that it had facilitated delivery of its 100 millionth treatment of praziquantel against schistosomiasis thanks to funding from private donations which complemented the ICOSA award from DFID.

By 2016, SCI had reached an annual delivery of over 50 million treatments against parasitic worm infections.

By December 2018, the SCI had facilitated the delivery of its 200 millionth treatment against parasitic worm infections.

In August 2019, SCI became an independent charity, SCI Foundation.

In 2020, SCI foundation delivered 61.5 million treatments in 13 countries in sub-Saharan Africa and was recommended as a top charity by GiveWell for the 10th consecutive year.

In 2022, SCI Foundation celebrated its 20th anniversary and supporting the delivery of one billion treatments for parasitic worm infections. It was also awarded the status of Independent Research Organisation (IRO) by UK Research and Innovation (UKRI), the UK body responsible for supporting research, knowledge exchange and innovation.

In 2023, SCI Foundation launched a new five-year strategy and rebranded to Unlimit Health.
