= Neglected tropical diseases =

Diverse group of tropical infectious diseases which are common in developing countries

- Number of people requiring interventions against neglected tropical diseases in 2015
- Specialty: Infectious disease

Neglected tropical diseases (NTDs) are a diverse group of tropical infections that are common in low-income populations in developing regions of Africa, Asia, and the Americas. They are caused by a variety of pathogens, such as viruses, bacteria, protozoa, and parasitic worms (helminths) and mites (acarines). These diseases are broadly characterized by neglect within global health policy, contrasted with the "big three" infectious diseases (HIV/AIDS, tuberculosis, and malaria), which generally receive greater treatment and research funding. In sub-Saharan Africa, the effect of neglected tropical diseases as a group is comparable to that of malaria and tuberculosis. NTD co-infection can also make HIV/AIDS and tuberculosis more deadly.

Some treatments for NTDs are relatively inexpensive. For example, praziquantel for schistosomiasis costs about US $0.20 per child per year. Nevertheless, in 2010 it was estimated that control of neglected diseases would require funding of between US$2 billion and $3 billion over the subsequent five to seven years. Some pharmaceutical companies have committed to donating all the drug therapies required, and mass drug administration efforts (for example, mass deworming) have been successful in several countries. While preventive measures are often more accessible in the developed world, they are not universally available in poorer areas.

Within developed countries, neglected tropical diseases affect the very poorest in society. In developed countries, the burdens of neglected tropical diseases are often overshadowed by other public health issues. However, many of the same issues put populations at risk in developed as well as developing nations. For example, other problems stemming from poverty, such as lack of adequate housing, can expose individuals to the vectors of these diseases.

Twenty neglected tropical diseases are prioritized by the World Health Organization (WHO), though other organizations define NTDs differently. Chromoblastomycosis and other deep mycoses, scabies and other ectoparasites, and snakebite envenomation were added to the WHO list in 2017. These diseases are common in 149 countries, affecting more than 1.4 billion people (including more than 500 million children) and costing developing economies billions of dollars every year. They resulted in 142,000 deaths in 2013, down from 204,000 deaths in 1990.

== Reasons for neglect ==
The importance of neglected tropical diseases has been underestimated since many are asymptomatic and have long incubation periods. The connection between death and a neglected tropical disease that has been latent for a long period is often not realized. Areas of high endemicity are often geographically isolated, making treatment and prevention much more difficult.

There are three other major reasons that these diseases have been overlooked: they mainly affect the poorest countries of the developing world; in recent years public health efforts have focused heavily on decreasing the prevalence of HIV/AIDS, tuberculosis, and malaria (far more resources are given to those three diseases because of their higher mortality rates and higher public awareness of them); and neglected tropical diseases do not currently have a prominent cultural figure to champion their elimination.

=== Stigma ===
Neglected tropical diseases are often associated with social stigma, making their treatment more complex. Public health research has only recently begun to focus on stigma as a component of the issue. From the 1960s onward, approximately one citation a year related to social stigma. In 2006, there were 458.

Stigma greatly affects disease control by decreasing help-seeking and treatment adherence. Disease control programs since the 1980s have begun to integrate stigma mitigation into their offerings. In India, a leprosy program prioritized the message that "leprosy is curable, not hereditary" in order to inspire optimism in highly affected communities. The goal was to make leprosy a disease "like any other", so as to reduce stigma. At the same time, medical resources were optimized to fulfill the promise that the disease could be cured.

=== Economic incentives ===
Treatment and prevention of neglected tropical diseases are not seen as profitable, so patents and profit play a reduced role in stimulating innovation compared to other diseases. Like all non-commercial areas, communities affected by these diseases are reliant on governments and philanthropy. Currently, the pharmaceutical industry views research and development as highly risky. For this reason, resources are not often put into the field of NTDs, and new chemical products are often expensive. A review of public and private initiatives found that of the 1,393 new chemical products that were marketed between 1975 and 1999, only 16 were related to tropical diseases or tuberculosis. The same review found that there was a 13-fold greater chance of a newly marketed drug being for central nervous system disorders or cancer than for an NTD.

Because of a lack of economic incentives for the pharmaceutical industry, successful NTD treatment programs have often relied on donations. For instance, the Mectizan Donation Program has donated over 1.8 billion tablets of ivermectin. While developed countries often rely on government-run and private partnerships to fund such projects, developing nations frequently have significantly lower per-person spending on these diseases.

A 2006 report found that the Gates Foundation funded most extra activities to counter these diseases.

=== Neglected diseases in developed nations ===
Since 2008, the concept of "neglected diseases of poverty" has been developed and explored. This group of diseases, which overlaps with neglected tropical diseases, also pose a threat to human health in developed nations. In the United States alone, there are at least 12 million people with neglected parasitic infections. They make up a hidden disease burden among the poorest people in wealthy societies. In developed nations, lack of knowledge in the healthcare industry and lack of conclusive diagnostic tests perpetuate the neglect of this group of diseases.

In the United States, rates of parasitic infection can be distributed along geographic, racial, and socio-economic lines. Among African Americans, there may be up to 2.8 million cases of toxocariasis. Toxocariasis, trichomoniasis, and some other neglected infections occur in the United States at the same rate as in Nigeria. Within the Hispanic community, neglected infections are concentrated near the US–Mexico border. Vector-borne illnesses are especially high, with some rates approaching those of Latin America. Chagas disease was found in the US as early as the 1970s. However, in the developed world, diseases that are associated with poverty are often not addressed comprehensively. This may be due to a lack of economic incentives and public policy failings. A lack of awareness prevents effective policy generation and leaves healthcare services unequipped to address the issue. Additionally, little effort is put into creating and maintaining large data sets on neglected diseases in the United States and other developed nations. The first summit on the issue was held by the Adler Institute on Social Exclusion in the United States in 2009.

In Europe, a similar trend is seen. Neglected tropical diseases are concentrated in eastern and southern Europe, where poverty levels are highest. The most prevalent diseases in this region are ascariasis, trichuriasis, zoonotic helminth infections, and visceral leishmaniasis. Migration paths to Europe, most notably to Spain, have brought diseases to Europe as well. As many as 6,000 cases of Chagas disease have been introduced in this way. In response to a growing awareness of the burden on these populations, the European Centre for Disease Prevention and Control has laid out ten public health guidelines. They cover a variety of topics, from health education and promotion to community partnerships and the development of a minority healthcare workforce.

== List of diseases ==
=== Overview ===
There is some debate among the WHO, CDC, and infectious disease experts over which diseases are classified as neglected tropical diseases. Feasey, a researcher in neglected tropical diseases, notes 13 neglected tropical diseases: ascariasis, Buruli ulcer, Chagas disease, dracunculiasis, hookworm infection, human African trypanosomiasis, leishmaniasis, leprosy, lymphatic filariasis, onchocerciasis, schistosomiasis, trachoma, and trichuriasis. Fenwick recognizes 12 "core" neglected tropical diseases: the same as above, excluding hookworm.

These diseases result from four classes of causative pathogens: (i) protozoa (Chagas disease, human African trypanosomiasis, and leishmaniasis); (ii) bacteria (Buruli ulcer, leprosy, trachoma, and yaws), (iii) helminths or metazoan worms (cysticercosis/taeniasis, dracunculiasis, echinococcosis, foodborne trematodiases, lymphatic filariasis, onchocerciasis, schistosomiasis, and soil-transmitted helminthiasis); and (iv) viruses (dengue, chikungunya, and rabies).

The WHO recognizes the twenty diseases below as neglected tropical diseases.

WHO/CDC	Type	PLOS Major NTDs
Chagas disease African trypanosomiasis Leishmaniasis	Protozoan infections	Entamoeba histolytica and Naegleria fowleri (both pathogenic amoeba); Babesiosis; Balantidiasis; Chagas disease; Giardiasis; Human African Trypanosomiasis; Leishmaniasis; Plasmodium vivax and other non-P. falciparum malarias
Dracunculiasis; Echinococcosis; Lymphatic filariasis Onchocerciasis; Schistosomiasis; Cysticercosis; Soil-transmitted helminthiasis Fascioliasis	Helminth infections	Dracunculiasis; Echinococcosis; Food-borne Trematodiases; Loiasis; Lymphatic Filariasis; Onchocerciasis; Other food-borne helminthiases (Trichinosis, Anisakiasis, Gnathostomiasis); Schistosomiasis; Soil-transmitted helminthiases (Ascariasis, Hookworm Diseases, Trichuriasis, Strongyloidiasis); Taeniasis and Cysticercosis; Toxocariasis and Baylisascaris (caustive agents of VLM).
Dengue & Chikungunya*; Rabies	Viral infections	Arboviral infections (Dengue, Chikungunya, Zika, Japanese encephalitis, Jungle yellow fever and others); Enterovirus 71 and related viruses; HTLV-1, HTLV-2 and other non-HIV retrovirus infections; Rabies; Rift Valley fever; Viral hemorrhagic fevers
Buruli ulcer Leprosy; Trachoma; Yaws	Bacterial infections	Bartonellosis; Atypical mycobacteria (including Mycobacterium bovis and Buruli ulcer); Cholera and other enteric bacteria (Shigella, Salmonella, E. coli); Leprosy; Leptospirosis; Melioidosis; Noma; Relapsing fever; Trachoma; Yaws, Bejel and Pinta; Q fever
Mycetoma and deep mycoses	Fungal infections	Mycetoma; Paracoccidioidomycosis; Chromoblastomycosis; Other deep tissue mycoses
Scabies and other ectoparasites	Ectoparasites	Scabies; Myiasis
Snakebite envenoming	Non-infectious diseases caused by toxin exposure	Podoconiosis; Snakebite envenoming
* Only WHO		

The World Health Organization's 2010 report on neglected tropical diseases offers an expanded list including dengue, rabies, yaws, cysticercosis, echinococcosis, and foodborne trematode infections.

=== Disease burden ===
Neglected Tropical Diseases Worldwide Burden
Disease	DALYs (million)	Deaths/Yr	Global Prevalence (million)	Population at Risk (million)
Schistosomiasis	4.5	280,000	207	780
Hookworm	22.1	65,000	576	3200
Ascariasis	10.5	60,000	807	4200
Leishmaniasis	2.1	51,000	12	350
Trypanosomiasis	1.5	48,000	0.3	60
Chagas disease	0.7	14,000	8	25
Trichuriasis	6.4	10,000	604	3200
Leprosy	0.2	6,000	0.4	Not Determined
Lymphatic filariasis	5.8	0	120	1300
Trachoma	2.3	0	84	590
Onchocerciasis	0.5	0	37	90
Cryptococcosis	12	400,000	1	8

== Diseases ==
=== Buruli ulcer ===
Buruli ulcer is caused by the bacterium Mycobacterium ulcerans. It is related to the bacteria that cause tuberculosis and leprosy. Mycobacterium ulcerans produces a toxin, mycolactone, that destroys tissue. The prevalence of Buruli ulcer is unknown. The risk of mortality is low, although secondary infections can be lethal. Morbidity takes the form of deformity, disability, and skin lesions, which can be prevented through early treatment with antibiotics and surgery. It is found in Africa, Asia, Australia, and Latin America.

=== Chagas disease ===
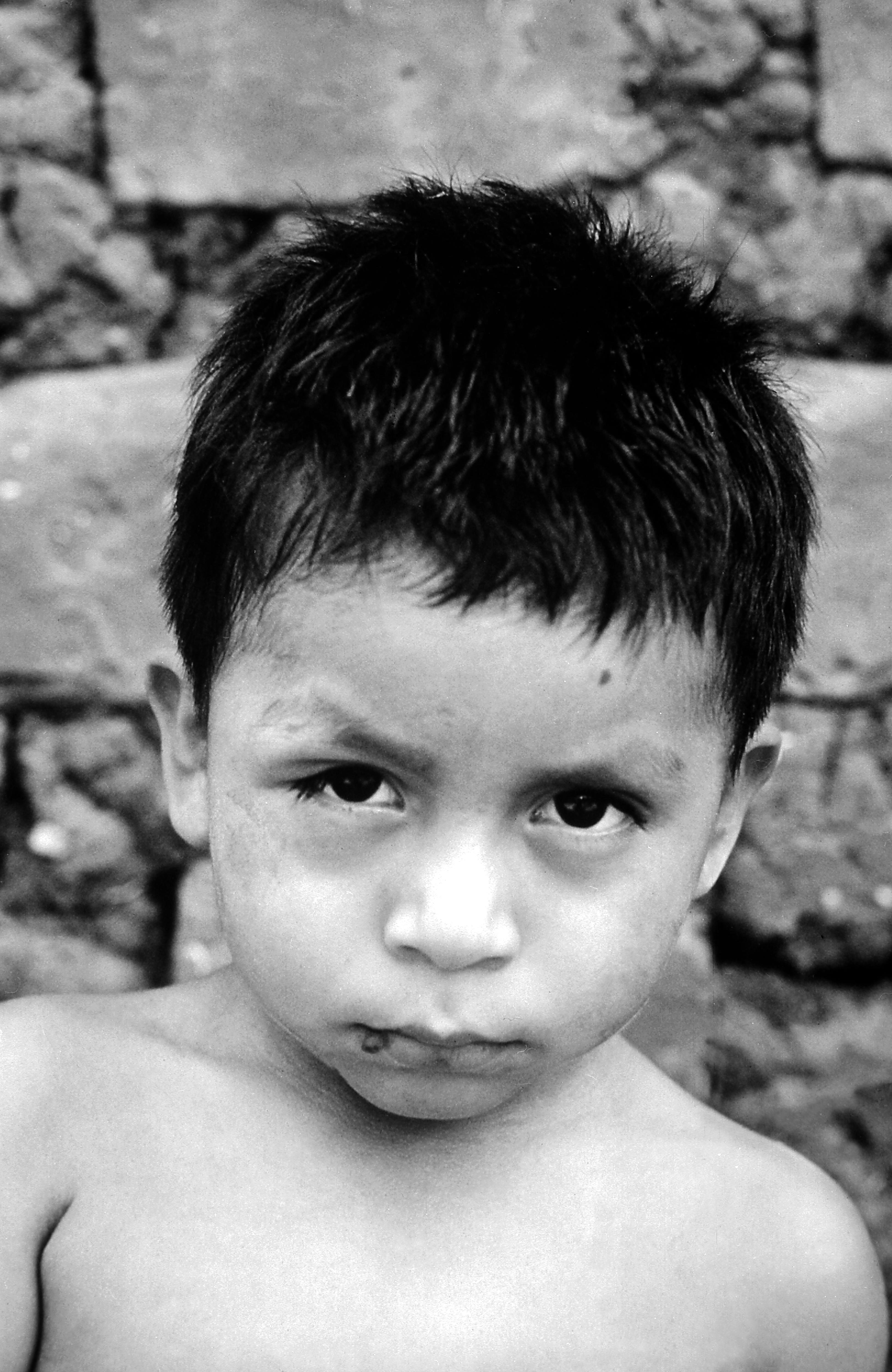
A young boy from Panama with Chagas disease. It has manifested as an acute infection with swelling of one eye (chagoma).

Chagas disease is also known as American trypanosomiasis. There are approximately 15 million people infected with Chagas disease. Morbidity rates are higher for immunocompromised individuals, children, and the elderly, but can be very low if the disease is treated early. Chagas disease does not kill victims rapidly, instead causing years of debilitating chronic symptoms.

It is caused by the vector-borne protozoa Trypanosoma cruzi. It is spread by contact with Trypanosoma cruzi-infected feces of the triatomine (assassin bug). The protozoan can enter the body via the bug's bite, skin breaks, or mucous membranes. Infection can result from eating infected food or coming into contact with contaminated bodily fluids.

There are two phases of Chagas disease. The acute phase is usually asymptomatic. The first symptoms are usually skin chancres, unilateral purplish orbital oedema, local lymphadenopathy, and fever, accompanied by a variety of other symptoms depending on the infection site. The chronic phase occurs in 30 percent of all infections and can take three forms: asymptomatic (most prevalent), cardiac, and digestive lesions.

Chagas disease can be prevented by avoiding insect bites through insecticide spraying, home improvement, bed nets, hygienic food, medical care, laboratory practices, and testing. It can be diagnosed through a serological test, although the test is not very accurate. Treatment is with medication, which may have severe side effects.

=== Dengue and chikungunya ===
There are 50–100 million dengue virus infections annually. Dengue fever is usually not fatal, but infection with one of four serotypes can increase later susceptibility to other serotypes, resulting in a potentially fatal disease called severe dengue. Dengue fever is caused by a flavivirus which is spread mostly by the bite of the Aedes aegypti mosquito. No treatment for either dengue or severe dengue exists beyond palliative care. The symptoms are high fever and flu-like symptoms. It is found in Asia, Latin America, and Northern Australia.

Chikungunya is an arboviral disease transmitted by A. albopictus and A. aegypti mosquitoes. The virus was first isolated from an outbreak in Tanzania in 1952. Chikungunya virus is a member of the genus Alphavirus and family Togaviridae. The word "chikungunya" is from the Makonde language and means "that which bends up", referring to the effect of debilitating joint pain on the patient. Symptoms, generally appearing 5–7 days after exposure, can be confused with dengue and include fever, rash, headache, joint pain, and swelling. The disease mainly occurs in Africa and Asia.

=== Dracunculiasis ===
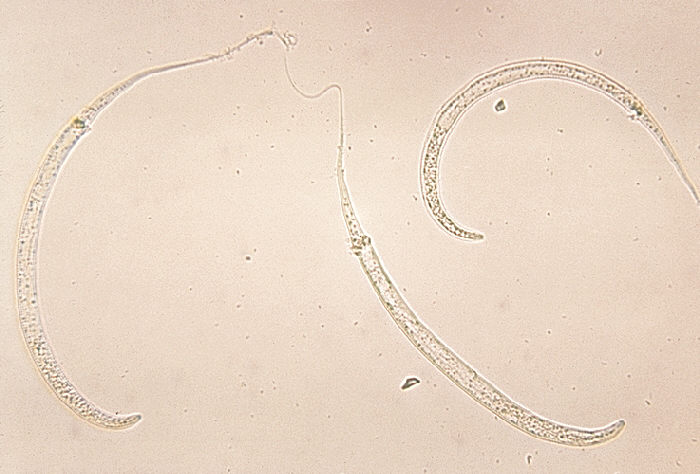
Dracunculus medinensis larvae

Dracunculiasis is also known as Guinea-worm disease. In 2019, 53 cases were reported across four countries, a substantial decrease from 3,500,000 cases in 1986. It is not fatal, but can cause months of inactivity. It is caused by drinking water contaminated by water fleas infected with guinea-worm larvae. Approximately one year after infection, a painful blister forms and one or more worms emerge. Worms can be up to 1 metre long.

It is usually treated by World Health Organization volunteers who clean and bandage wounds caused by worms and return daily to pull the worm out a few more inches. Dracunculiasis is preventable by water filtration, immediate case identification to prevent spread, health education, and treating ponds with larvicide. An eradication program has been able to reduce prevalence. As of 2014, the four endemic countries are Chad, Ethiopia, Mali, and South Sudan.

=== Echinococcosis ===
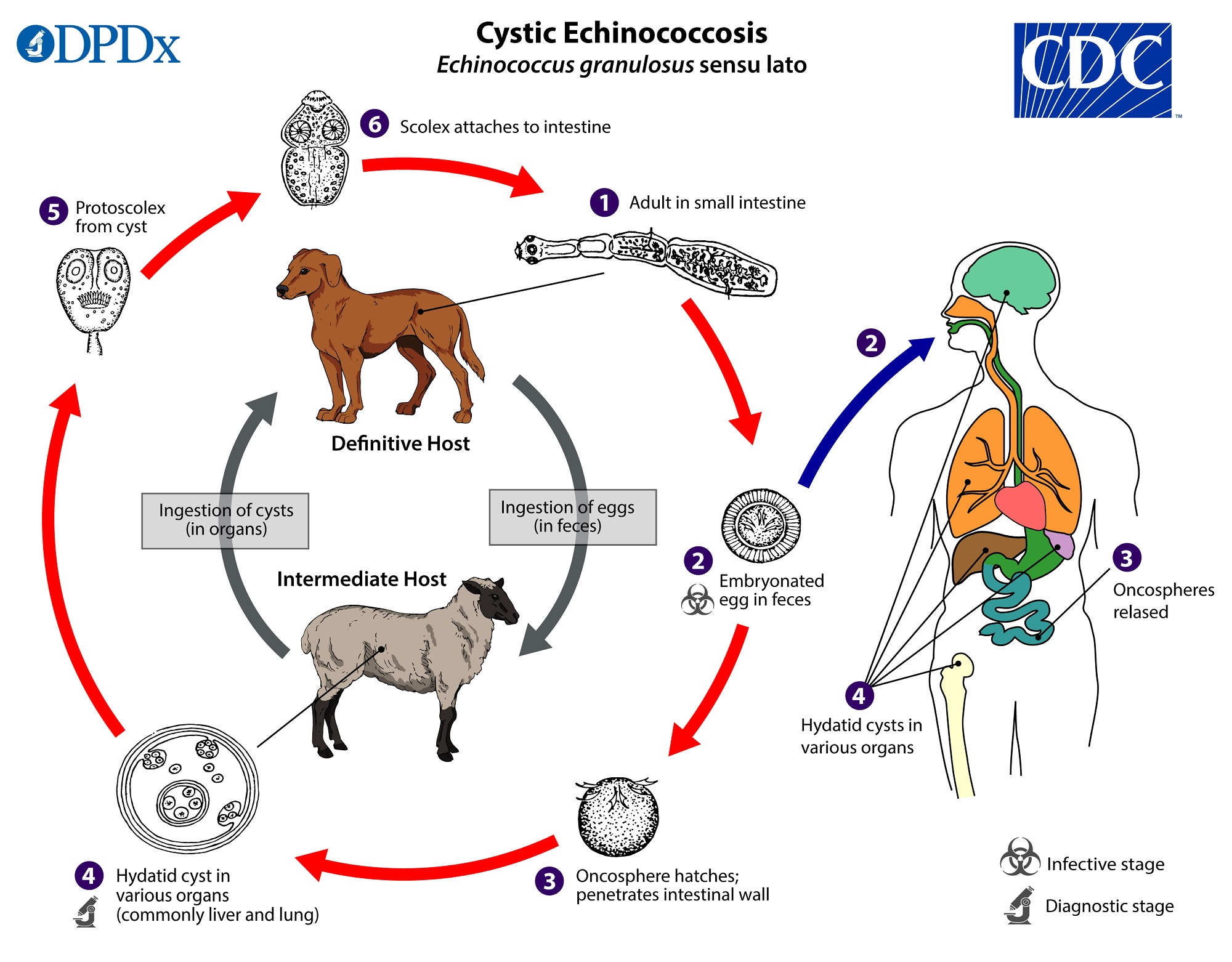
Lifecycle of Echinococcus

The rate of echinococcosis is higher in rural areas, and there are more than one million people infected currently. It is caused by ingesting parasites in animal feces.

There are two versions of the disease: cystic and alveolar. Both versions involve an asymptomatic incubation period of several years. In the cystic version, liver cysts cause abdominal pain, nausea, and vomiting, while cysts in the lungs cause chronic cough, chest pain, and shortness of breath. In alveolar echinococcosis, a primary cyst develops, usually in the liver, in addition to weight loss, abdominal pain, malaise, and signs of liver failure. Untreated alveolar echinococcosis is fatal.

Surgery and drugs can be used to treat echinococcosis. It can be prevented by deworming dogs, sanitation, proper disposal of animal feces, health education, and livestock vaccination. Cystic echinococcosis is found in the eastern portion of the Mediterranean region, northern Africa, southern and eastern Europe, the southern portion of South America, and Central Asia. Alveolar echinococcosis is found in western and northern China, Russia, Europe, and northern North America. It can be diagnosed through imaging techniques and serological tests.

=== Yaws ===
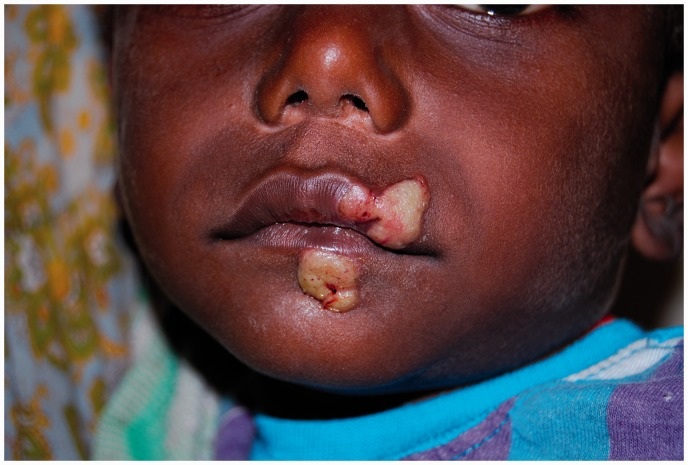
A child with yaws

There are limited data available on the prevalence of yaws, although it primarily affects children. The mortality risk is very low, but the disease causes disfigurement and disability if untreated. The most common symptom is skin lesions. It is a chronic bacterial infection, transmitted by skin contact, and caused by the spirochete bacterium Treponema pallidum pertenue. It is treated with antibiotics and can be prevented through hygiene and sanitation. Yaws is most prevalent in warm, moist tropical regions of the Americas, Africa, Asia, and the Pacific.

=== Foodborne trematodiases ===
Foodborne trematode infections include clonorchiasis, opisthorchiasis, fascioliasis, and paragonimiasis. These infections are all zoonotic, primarily affecting domestic or wild animals, but can also be transmitted to humans. They are acquired by eating food, such as raw fish, contaminated with the larval stages of the parasites. At least 40 million people are thought to be infected.

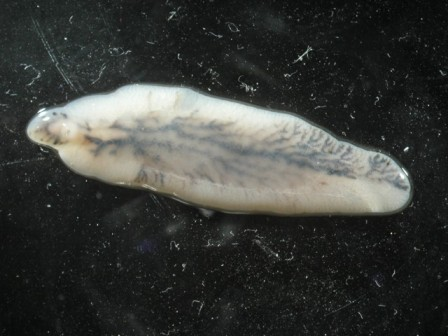
Fasciola hepatica

=== Human African trypanosomiasis ===
African trypanosomiasis (African sleeping sickness) is a somewhat rare protozoal disease, with fewer than 10,000 cases currently. Human African trypanosomiasis is vector-borne and spreads through the bite of the tsetse fly. The most common symptoms are fever, headache, lymphadenopathy, sleeping disturbances, personality changes, cognitive decline, and coma. The disease is always fatal if untreated. The current forms of treatment are highly toxic and ineffective, as resistance is spreading. It is diagnosed through an inexpensive serological test.

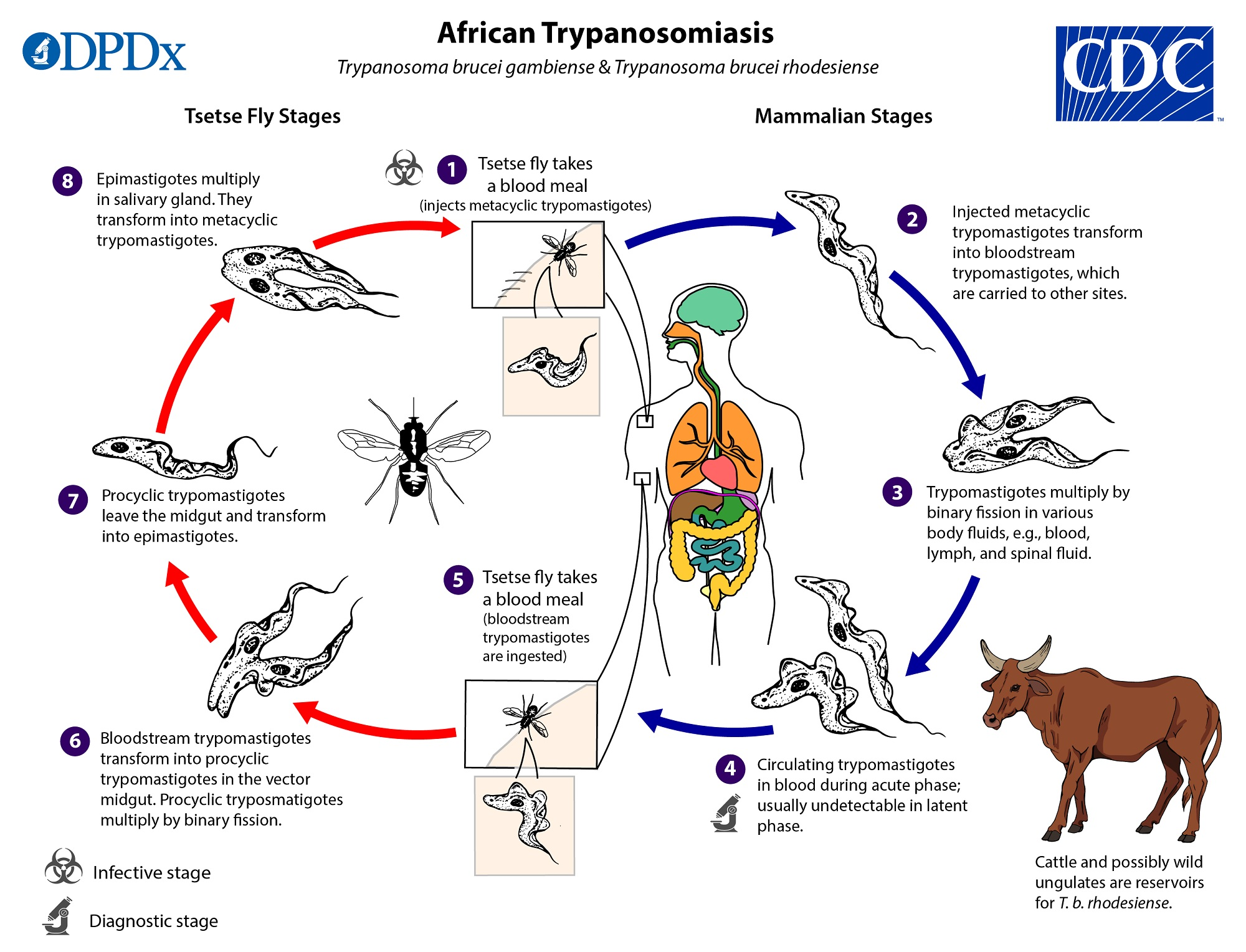
Lifecycle of African Trypanosomiasis

=== Leishmaniasis ===
Lifecycle of Leishmaniasis

The three forms of leishmaniasis, a protozoal disease, are visceral (Kala-azar), cutaneous, and mucocutaneous. There are an estimated 12 million people infected. It is fatal if untreated, and 20,000 deaths from visceral leishmaniasis occur annually. It is a vector-borne disease caused by the bite of sandflies. At least 90 percent of visceral leishmaniasis occurs in Bangladesh, Brazil, Ethiopia, India, South Sudan, and Sudan. Cutaneous leishmaniasis occurs in Afghanistan, Algeria, Brazil, Colombia, Iran, Pakistan, Peru, Saudi Arabia, and Syria. Around 90 percent of mucocutaneous leishmaniasis occurs in Bolivia, Brazil, and Peru.

A vaccine is under development to prevent leishmaniasis. The only other method of prevention is avoidance of sandfly bites. Diagnosis can be made by clinical signs, serological tests, or parasitological tests. Leishmaniasis can be treated with expensive medications.

=== Leprosy ===
According to recent figures from the WHO, 208,619 new cases of leprosy were reported in 2018 from 127 countries. It is most prevalent in India (69% of cases), Brazil, Indonesia, Nigeria, the Democratic Republic of the Congo, Madagascar, and East Africa from Mozambique to Ethiopia, with the highest relative incidence in India, Brazil, and Nepal. There are one to two million individuals currently disabled or disfigured due to past or present leprosy. It is caused by bacteria and transmitted through droplets from the mouth and nose of infected individuals.

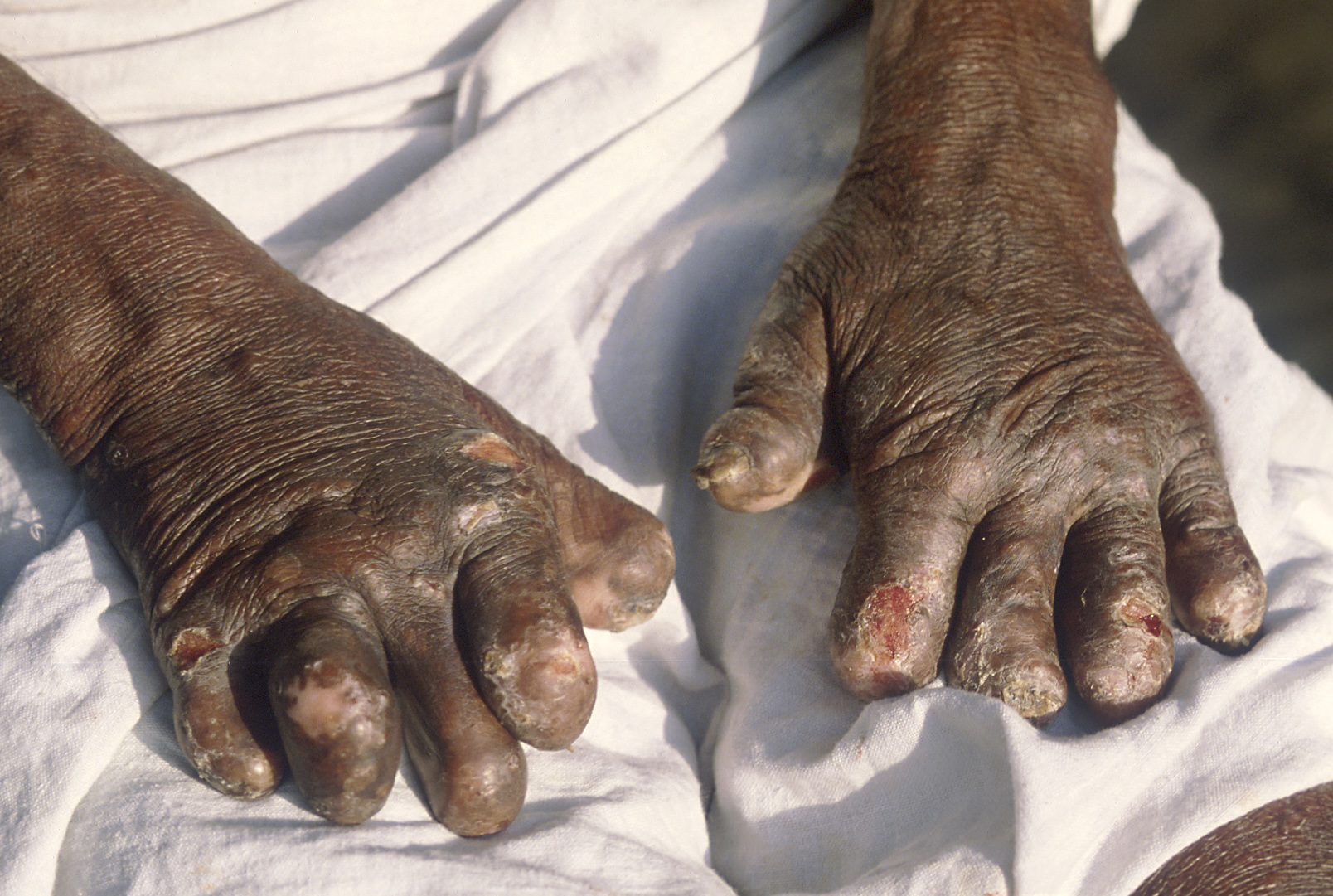
Hands deformed by leprosy

Leprosy causes disfigurement and physical disabilities if untreated. It is curable if treated early. Treatment requires multidrug therapy. The BCG vaccine has some preventative effect against leprosy. Leprosy has a 5–20 year incubation period, and the symptoms are damage to the skin, nerves, eyes, and limbs.

=== Lymphatic filariasis ===
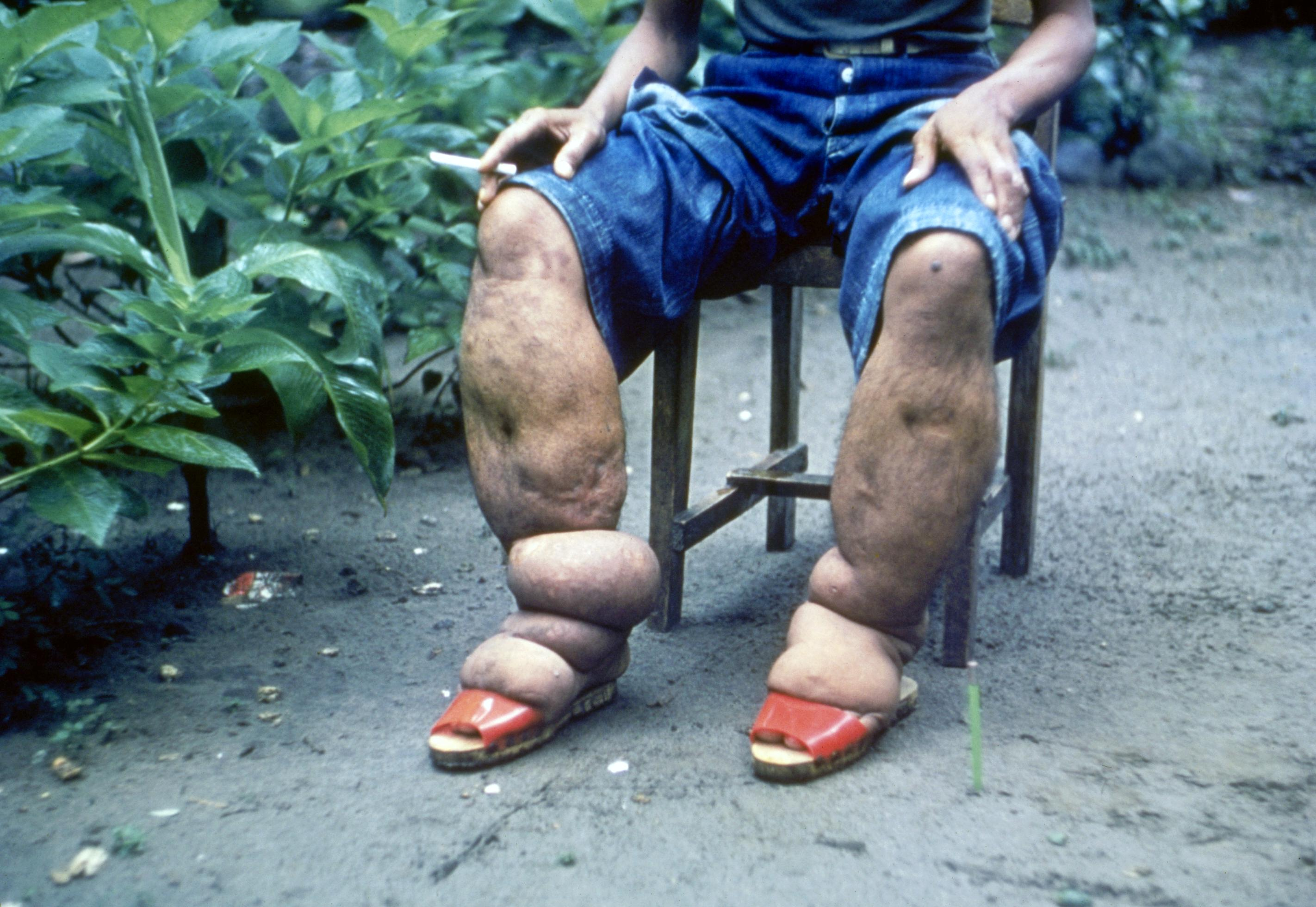
Elephantiasis

Lymphatic filariasis is also known as elephantiasis. There are approximately 120 million individuals infected and 40 million with deformities. Approximately two-thirds of cases are in Southwest Asia, and one-third are in Africa. Lymphatic filariasis is rarely fatal but has lifelong implications, such as lymphoedema of the limbs, genital disease, and painful recurrent attacks. Most people are asymptomatic but have lymphatic damage. Up to 40 percent of infected individuals have kidney damage. It is a vector-borne disease, caused by nematode worms that are transmitted by mosquitoes.

It can be treated with cost-effective antihelminthic treatments, and washing skin can slow or even reverse damage. It is diagnosed with a finger-prick blood test.

=== Noma ===
Noma, an opportunistic bacterial infection causing gangrenous necrosis of the mouth, was added to the World Health Organization's list of neglected tropical diseases in December 2023.

=== Onchocerciasis ===
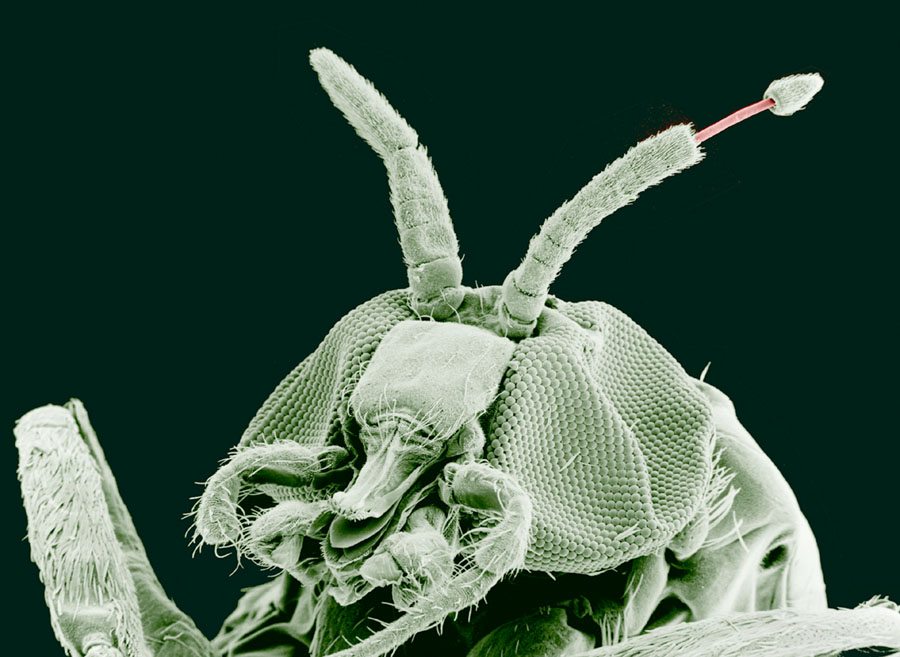
Onchocerca volvulus emerging from a blackfly

Onchocerciasis is also known as river blindness. There are 20.9 million people infected, and prevalence is higher in rural areas. Over 99 percent of cases are in sub-Saharan Africa. It causes blindness, skin rashes, lesions, intense itching, and skin depigmentation. It is a vector-borne disease, caused by blackflies infected with the filarial nematode Onchocerca volvulus.

It can be treated with ivermectin and prevented by insecticide spraying or preventative dosing with ivermectin.

=== Rabies ===
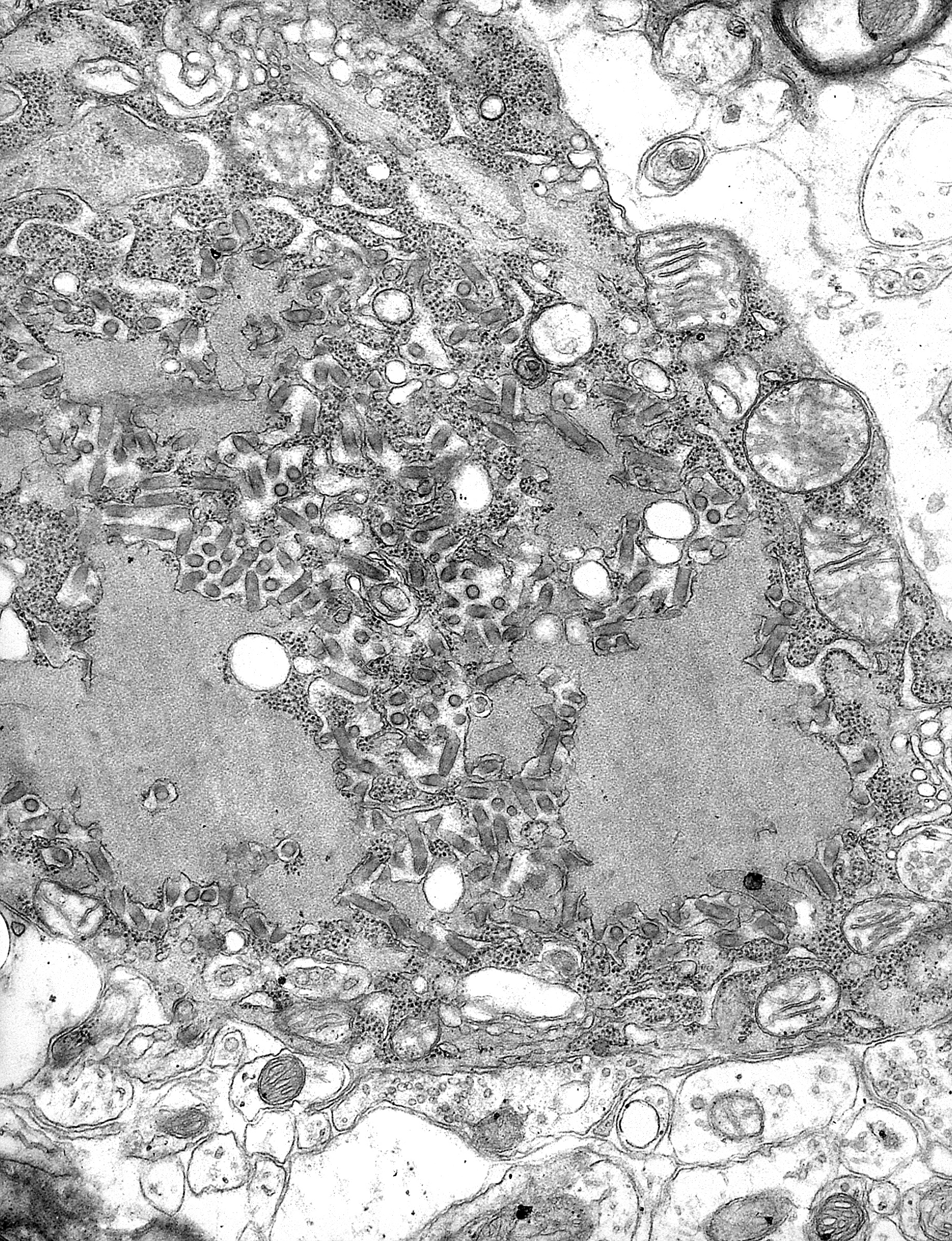
Rabies virus

There are two forms of rabies: furious and paralytic. It is mostly found in Asia and Africa. There is a higher prevalence in rural areas, and it disproportionately affects children. Rabies is fatal after symptoms develop. It is caused by a lyssavirus transmitted through wounds or bites from infected animals.

The first symptoms are fever and pain near the infection site, which occur after a one- to three-month incubation period. Furious rabies (the more common type) causes hyperactivity, hydrophobia, and aerophobia; death by cardio-respiratory arrest occurs within days. Paralytic rabies causes a slow progression from paralysis to coma to death. There are 60,000 deaths from rabies annually.

It can be prevented in dogs by vaccination and by cleaning and disinfecting bite wounds and post-exposure prophylaxis. Rabies is undiagnosable before symptoms develop. It can be detected through tissue testing after symptoms develop.

=== Schistosomiasis ===
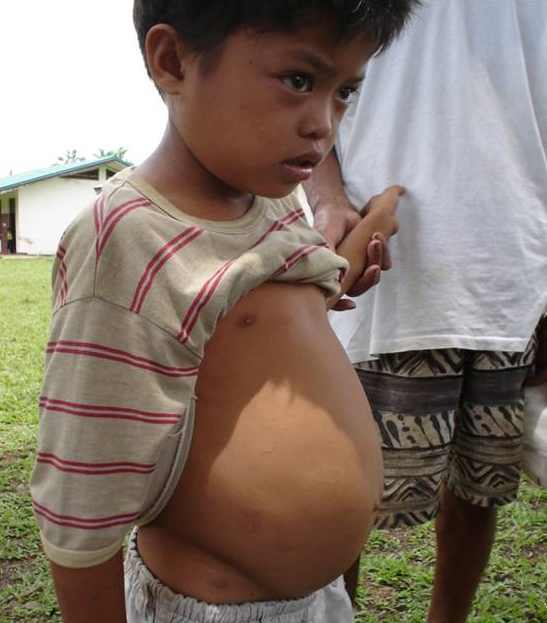
11-year-old Filipino boy with ascites due to schistosomiasis

There are over 200 million cases of schistosomiasis. Approximately 85 percent of cases are in sub-Saharan Africa. The disease can be fatal by causing bladder cancer and hematemesis. Schistosoma species have a complex life cycle that alternates between humans and freshwater snails. Infection occurs when the skin comes into contact with contaminated fresh water in which snails that carry the parasite are living. Symptoms for schistosomiasis are not caused by the worms but by the body's reaction to the eggs. The eggs that do not pass out of the body can become lodged in the intestine or bladder, causing inflammation or scarring. Children who are repeatedly infected can develop anemia, malnutrition, and learning difficulties. The symptoms are usually haematuria, bladder obstruction, renal failure, bladder cancer, periportal fibrosis, bladder fibrosis, liver fibrosis, portal hypertension, cervical lesions, ascites, and esophageal varices.

Inexpensive praziquantel can be used to treat individuals with schistosomiasis, but it cannot prevent reinfection. The cost of prevention is US$0.32 per child per year. Mass deworming treatment with praziquantel, better access to safe water, sanitation, and health education can all be used to prevent schistosomiasis. Vaccines are under development. It can be diagnosed through a serological test, but the test often produces false negatives.

=== Soil-transmitted helminthiasis ===
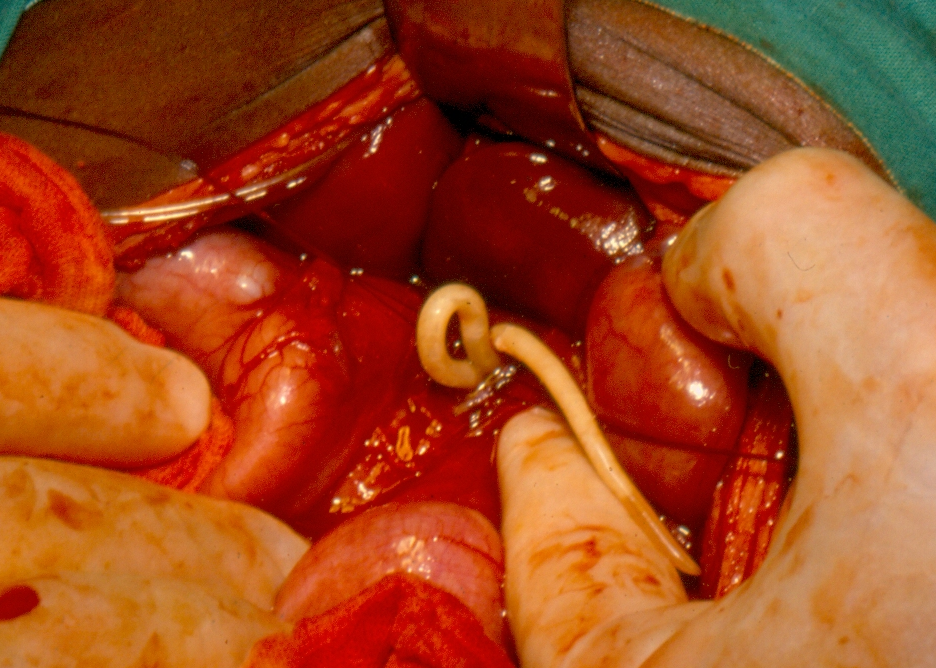
Adult ascaris worms being removed from the bile duct of a patient in South Africa

Soil-transmitted helminthiasis is the most prevalent neglected tropical disease. The four major worm species responsible for soil-transmitted helminthiasis are Ascaris (roundworms), Trichuris (whipworm), the hookworms Necator americanus and Ancylostoma duodenale, and Strongyloides stercoralis. There are 1.5 billion people currently infected. Soil-transmitted helminthiasis occurs in sub-Saharan Africa, the Americas, China, and East Asia. The mortality risk is very low. The most common symptoms are anemia, stunted growth, intestinal problems, lack of energy, and compromised physical and cognitive development. Infected children often fall behind in schooling. The severity of symptoms depends on the number of worms in the body.

Parasitic worms are generally transmitted via exposure to infected human feces and soil that are spread in the environment, for example, due to open defecation. The most common treatment is medicine. It can be prevented through hygienically prepared food and clean water, improved sanitation, periodic deworming, and health education. The World Health Organization recommends mass deworming without prior diagnosis.

=== Taeniasis and cysticercosis ===
Cysticercosis is an infection by larvae of the pork tapeworm Taenia solium, while taeniasis is infection by adult Taenia species tapeworms, including T. solium, the beef tapeworm T. saginata and the Asian tapeworm T. asiatica. Both cysticercosis and taeniasis are found in Asia, Africa, and Latin America, particularly on farms in which pigs are exposed to human excrement.

Cysticercosis is the most common preventable cause of epilepsy in the developing world. Cysticercosis occurs after ingestion of food, water, or soil contaminated by human fecal matter. Cysts and lesions can cause headaches, blindness, seizures, hydrocephalus, meningitis, and dementia. Neurocysticercosis, or the parasitic infection of the nervous system, can be fatal.

Taeniasis is not fatal. It is usually contracted after eating undercooked contaminated pork or beef. Taeniasis has mild symptoms, including abdominal pain, nausea, diarrhea, or constipation, although cholangitis and appendicitis have been reported due to internal movement of motile proglottids, and intestinal obstruction by large T. saginata occasionally occurs.

Drugs are used to treat both diseases. Infection can be prevented through stricter meat-inspection standards, livestock confinement, improved hygiene and sanitation, health education, safe meat preparation, and identifying and treating human and pig carriers.

=== Trachoma ===
There are 21.4 million people infected with trachoma, of whom 2.2 million are partially blind and 1.2 million are blind. It is found in Africa, Asia, Central and South America, the Middle East, and Australia. The disease disproportionately affects women and children. The mortality risk is very low, although multiple re-infections eventually lead to blindness. The symptoms are internally scarred eyelids, followed by eyelids turning inward. Trachoma is caused by a micro-organism that spreads through eye discharges (on hands, cloth, etc.) and by "eye-seeking flies".

It is treated with antibiotics. The only known prevention method is interpersonal hygiene.

=== Chromoblastomycosis and other deep mycoses ===
Chromoblastomycosis is a long-term fungal infection of the skin and subcutaneous tissue (a chronic subcutaneous mycosis).

It can be caused by many different types of fungi which become implanted under the skin, often by thorns or splinters. Chromoblastomycosis spreads very slowly.

It is rarely fatal and usually has a good prognosis, but it can be very difficult to cure. Several treatment options exist, including medication and surgery.

Other important endemic mycoses with common systemic involvement are histoplasmosis, paracoccidioidomycosis, coccidioidomycosis, blastomycosis and talaromycosis. These infections are also seldomly seen in returning travelers in western countries

=== Scabies ===
Scabies (/ˈskeɪbiːz/, SKAY-beez; also sometimes known as the seven-year itch) is a contagious human skin infestation by the tiny (0.2–0.45 mm) mite Sarcoptes scabiei, variety hominis. The word is from Latin: scabere, lit. 'to scratch'. It is a particular public health problem in crowded settings such as care homes, schools, refugee camps, prisons, and hospitals. The most common symptoms are severe itchiness and a pimple-like rash. Occasionally, tiny burrows may appear on the skin from eggs that are about to hatch. In a first-ever infection, the infected person usually develops symptoms within three weeks. During a second infection, symptoms may begin within 24 hours. These symptoms can be present across most of the body or just in certain areas such as the wrists, between fingers, or along the waistline. The head may be affected, but this is typically only in young children. The itch is often worse at night. Scratching may cause skin breakdown and an additional bacterial infection in the skin.

=== Snakebite envenoming ===
Snakebite was added to the list in 2017, after years of criticism of the WHO by activists for not making it a priority. The greatest burden of snakebite morbidity is in India and Southeast Asia. Snakebite envenoming (SBE) affects as many as 2.7 million people every year, most of whom live in some of the world's most remote, poorly developed, and politically marginalised tropical communities. With annual mortality of 81,000 to 138,000 and 400,000 surviving victims suffering permanent physical and psychological disabilities, SBE is a disease in urgent need of attention, but snakebites often go unreported. A policy analysis however found that the placement of snakebite in the global health agenda of WHO is fragile due to reluctance acceptance of the disease in the neglected tropical disease community and the perceived colonial nature of the network driving the agenda.

A snakebite is an injury caused by the bite of a snake, especially a venomous snake. A common sign of a bite from a venomous snake is the presence of two puncture wounds from the animal's fangs. Sometimes venom injection from the bite may occur. This may result in redness, swelling, and severe pain at the area, which may take up to an hour to appear. Vomiting, blurred vision, tingling of the limbs, and sweating may result. Most bites are on the hands, arms, or legs. Fear following a bite is common with symptoms of a racing heart and feeling faint. The venom may cause bleeding, kidney failure, a severe allergic reaction, tissue death around the bite, or breathing problems. Bites may result in the loss of a limb or other chronic problems or even death.

== Effects for patients ==
=== Social effects ===
==== Social stigma ====
Several NTDs, such as leprosy, cause severe deformities that result in social stigma. Stigma is considered to be the "hidden burden" of NTDs and is not accounted for in measures such as disability-adjusted life years (DALYs). Other NTDs that carry heavy social stigma include onchocerciasis, lymphatic filariasis, plague, Buruli ulcer, leishmaniasis, and Chagas disease. Lymphatic filariasis, for example, causes severe deformities that can result in denial of marriage and inability to work. Studies in Ghana and Sri Lanka have demonstrated that support groups for patients with lymphatic filariasis can increase participants' self-esteem, quality of life, and social relations through social support and providing practical advice on how to manage their illness. The social effects of neglected tropical diseases have been shown to affect men and women in different ways. Men are socially stigmatized in a way that detrimentally affects their economic prospects. Women are more likely to be affected in the areas of marriage and family.

==== Mental health ====
A 2012 review found that infection with a neglected tropical disease predisposes individuals to poor mental health. This is partially due to the social stigma that surrounds NTDs, but is also likely caused by the subsequent lack of access to health and social services. Overall, being a member of the infected community was found to cut individuals off from multiple aspects of society via civic rights, educational opportunities, and employment. A high prevalence of post-traumatic stress disorder (PTSD) and depression was found among people who had survived snakebites. More research needs to be directed to understanding psychological aspects of NTDs to understand their effects more fully and to direct strategies to manage them better in healthcare systems where mental health professionals are scarce.

==== Gender ====
NTDs disproportionately affect women and children. There is also added risk of hookworm infection during pregnancy and potential to transfer diseases such as Chagas during pregnancy. A study in Uganda found that women were able to obtain treatment more easily than men because they had fewer occupational responsibilities and were more trusting of treatments, but ignorance of the effects of medicines during pregnancy prevented adequate care. The paper concludes that gender should be considered when designing treatment programs in Uganda. Additionally, women often bear a heavier social stigma in relation to the pressure to marry.

=== Economic effects ===
The cost of treatment of some of these diseases, such as Buruli ulcer, can be almost the average household income for families in the highest quarter of incomes, while for those in the lowest quarter it can be over twice the yearly income. These enormous financial costs often cause deferral of treatment and financial ruin. These diseases also cost the government in terms of healthcare provision and lost worker productivity through morbidity and shortened life spans. In Kenya, for example, deworming is estimated to increase average adult income by 40 percent, which is a benefit-to-cost ratio of 100. Each untreated case of trachoma is estimated to cost US$118 in lost productivity. Each case of schistosomiasis causes a loss of 45.4 days of work per year. Most of the diseases cost the economies of developing countries millions of dollars. Large-scale prevention campaigns are predicted to increase agricultural output and education levels.

The low cost of treatment for NTDs can be attributed to the large scale of the programs, free provision of drugs by pharmaceutical companies, delivery modes of drugs, and unpaid volunteers who distribute the drugs. The economic burden of NTDs is undervalued and therefore the corresponding economic effect and cost-effectiveness of decreasing prevalence of NTDs is underestimated. The investment return on measures to control NTDs is estimated to be between 14 and 30 percent, depending on the disease and region.

=== Health effects ===
==== Coinfection ====
Coinfection is a major concern with NTDs, making them more damaging than their mortality rates might suggest. Because factors such as poverty, inadequate healthcare and inadequate sanitation practices contribute to all NTDs, they are often found in overlapping distributions. Helminth infections, as the most common infection of humans, are often found to be in multi-infection systems. For example, in Brazil, low socioeconomic status contributes to overcrowded housing. In these same areas, coinfection by Necator americanus and Schistosoma mansoni is common. The effect of each worm weakens the immune system, making infection from the other more likely and more severe. For this reason, coinfection carries a higher risk of mortality. NTDs may also play a role in infection with other diseases, such as malaria, HIV/AIDS, and tuberculosis. The ability of helminths to manipulate the immune system may create a physiological environment that could exacerbate the progression of HIV/AIDS. Some evidence from Senegal, Malawi, and Thailand has shown that helminth infections raise the risk of malarial infection.

== Prevention, treatment and eradication ==
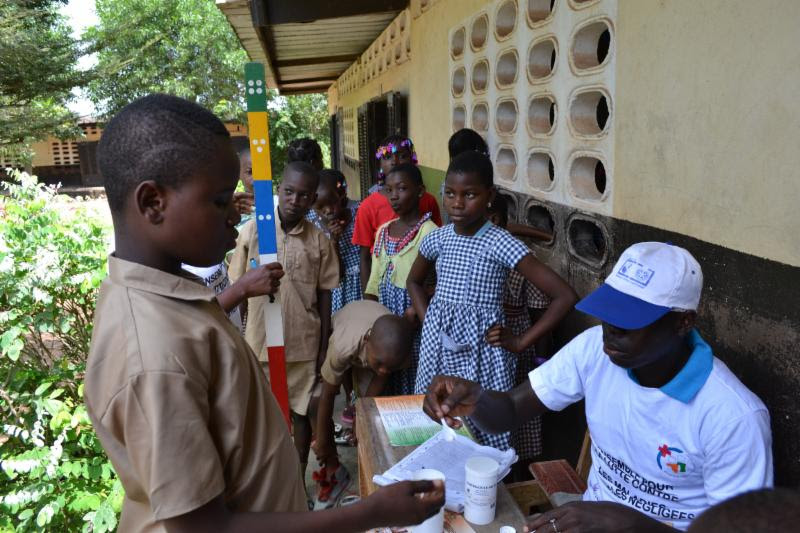
Eliminating NTDs in Côte d'Ivoire through education and distribution of anti-parasitic drugs

Prevention and eradication are important because "of the appalling stigma, disfigurement, blindness and disabilities caused by NTDs." The principal aim of the London Declaration on Neglected Tropical Diseases was the elimination or eradication of dracunculiasis, leprosy, lymphatic filariasis, onchocerciasis, trachoma, sleeping sickness, visceral leishmaniasis, and canine rabies within ten years of its launch in January 2012. The declaration is a collaborative effort involving the WHO, the World Bank, the Bill & Melinda Gates Foundation, the world's 13 leading pharmaceutical companies, and government representatives from the US, UK, United Arab Emirates, Bangladesh, Brazil, Mozambique, and Tanzania.

While there has been a noticeable uptick in biological research into NTDs, prevention may be supplemented by social and development outreach. Spiegel and coauthors advocated for "social offset", which reallocates some funding for biotechnological research to social programs. This attempts to alleviate some of the factors (such as poverty, poor sanitation, overcrowding and poor healthcare) that greatly exacerbate conditions brought on by NTDs. Projects such as these also strengthen the goal of sustained eliminations rather than quickly addressing symptoms.

=== Policy initiatives ===
There are many prevention and eradication campaigns funded by organizations such as the World Health Organization, US Agency for International Development, Bill & Melinda Gates Foundation, and UK Department for International Development.

Sustainable Development Goal 3 has the target: "By 2030, [to] end the epidemics of AIDS, tuberculosis, malaria and neglected tropical diseases and combat hepatitis, water-borne diseases and other communicable diseases."

==== WHO Roadmap of 2012 ====
In 2012, WHO published an NTD "roadmap", which contained milestones for 2015 and 2020, and specified targets for eradication, elimination and intensified control of the different NTDs. For example:

- NTDs planned to be eradicated: dracunculiasis by the year 2015, endemic treponematoses (yaws) by 2020
- NTDs planned to be eliminated globally by 2020: blinding trachoma, leprosy, human African trypanosomiasis, and lymphatic filariasis
- NTDs planned to be eliminated in certain regions: rabies (by 2015 in Latin America, by 2020 in Southeast Asia and the western Pacific), Chagas disease (transmission through blood transfusion by 2015, intra-domiciliary transmission by 2020 in the Americas), visceral leishmaniasis (by 2020 in the Indian subcontinent), onchocerciasis (by 2015 in Latin America), and schistosomiasis (by 2015 in the eastern Mediterranean region, the Caribbean, Indonesia, and the Mekong River basin, and by 2020 in the Americas and western Pacific)
- NTDs planned to be eliminated in certain countries: human African trypanosomiasis (by 2015 in 80 percent of areas in which it occurs), onchocerciasis (by 2015 in Yemen, by 2020 in selected countries in Africa), and schistosomiasis (by 2020 in selected countries in Africa)
- Intensified control with specific targets for 2015 and 2020 are provided for these NTDs: dengue, Buruli ulcer, cutaneous leishmaniasis, taeniasis/cysticercosis and echinococcosis/hydatidosis, foodborne trematode infections, and soil-transmitted helminthiases.

In 2021, WHO updated their NTD roadmap "Together towards 2030", outlining their approach for 2021–2030.

==== Others ====
The U.S. Food and Drug Administration priority review voucher is an incentive for companies to invest in new drugs and vaccines for tropical diseases. A provision of the Food and Drug Administration Amendments Act of 2007 awards a transferable "priority review voucher" to any company that obtains approval for a treatment for one of the listed diseases. The voucher can later be used to accelerate the review of an unrelated drug. This program is for all tropical diseases and includes medicines for malaria and tuberculosis. The first voucher given was for Coartem, a malaria treatment.

The prize was proposed by Duke University faculty Henry Grabowski, Jeffrey Moe, and David Ridley in their 2006 Health Affairs paper "Developing Drugs for Developing Countries". In 2007, United States Senators Sam Brownback (R-KS) and Sherrod Brown (D-OH) sponsored an amendment to the Food and Drug Administration Amendments Act of 2007. President George W. Bush signed the bill in September 2007.

=== Deworming treatment ===
Deworming treatments in infected children may have some nutritional benefit, as worms are often partially responsible for malnutrition. However, in areas where these infections are common, there is strong evidence that mass deworming campaigns do not have a positive effect on children's average nutritional status, levels of blood haemoglobin, cognitive abilities, performance at school, or survival. To achieve health gains in the longer term, improvements in sanitation and hygiene behaviours are also required, together with deworming treatments.

The effect of mass deworming on school attendance is disputed. It has been argued that mass deworming has a positive effect on school attendance. The long-term benefits of deworming include a decrease in school absenteeism by 25 percent and an increase in adult earnings by 20 percent. A systematic review, however, found that there is little or no difference in attendance in children who receive mass deworming compared to children who did not. One study found that boys were enrolled in primary school for more years than boys who were in schools that did not offer such programs. Girls in the same study were about a quarter more likely to attend secondary school if they received treatment. Both groups went on to participate in more skilled sectors of the labor market. The economic growth generated from school programs such as this may balance out the actual expenses of the program. However, the results of this study are disputed (due to a high risk of bias in the study), and the positive long-term outcomes of mass deworming remain unclear.

=== Integration of treatment ===
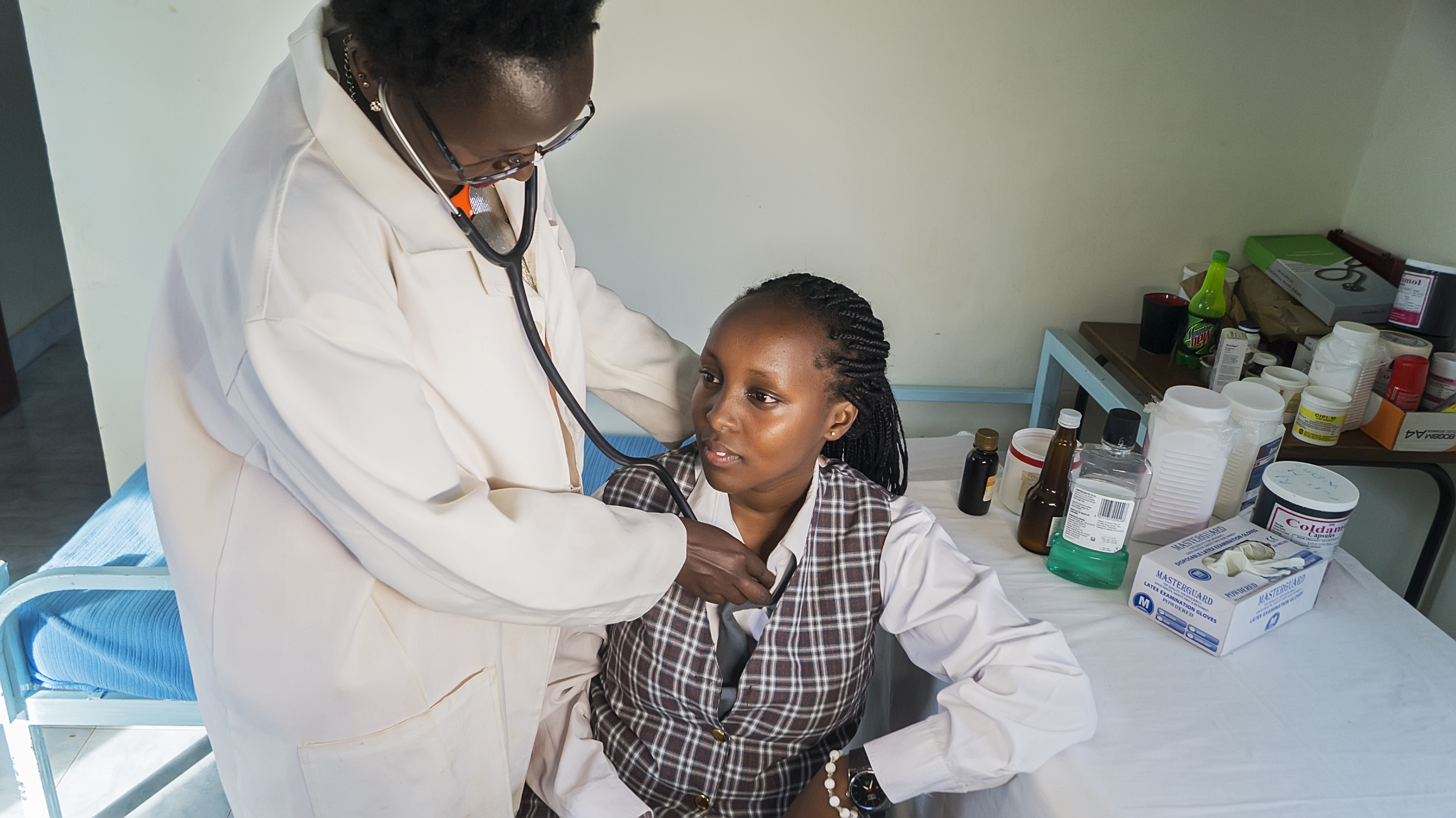
School nurse checks student's health in Kenya

Inclusion of NTDs into initiatives for malaria, HIV/AIDS, and tuberculosis, as well as integration of NTD treatment programs, may have advantages given the strong link between these diseases and NTDs. Some neglected tropical diseases share common vectors (sandflies, black flies, and mosquitos). Both medicinal and vector control efforts may be combined.

A four-drug rapid-impact package has been proposed that targets multiple diseases together. This package is estimated to cost US$0.40 per patient, with estimated saving of 26–47% compared to treating the diseases separately. While more research must be done in order to understand how NTDs and other diseases interact in both the vector and the human stages, safety assessments have so far produced positive results.

Many neglected tropical diseases and other prevalent diseases share common vectors, creating another opportunity for treatment and control integration. One such example of this is malaria and lymphatic filariasis, which are both transmitted by the same or related mosquito vectors. Vector control, through the distribution of insecticide-treated nets, reduces human contact with a wide variety of disease vectors. Integrated vector control may also alleviate pressure on mass drug administration, especially with respect to rapidly evolving drug resistance. Combining vector control and mass drug administration deemphasizes both, making each less susceptible to resistance evolution.

=== Integration with water, sanitation and hygiene (WASH) programs ===
Water, sanitation, and hygiene (WASH) interventions are essential in preventing many NTDs, such as soil-transmitted helminthiasis. Mass drug administration alone will not protect people from re-infection. A more holistic and integrated approach to NTDs and WASH efforts will benefit both sectors along with the communities they are aiming to serve. This is especially true in areas where more than one NTD is endemic.

In August 2015, the World Health Organization unveiled a global strategy and action plan to integrate WASH with other public health interventions to accelerate the elimination of NTDs. The plan aimed to intensify control or eliminate certain NTDs in specific regions by 2020, and referred to the NTD "roadmap" milestones from 2012 that included eradication of dracunculiasis by 2015 and of yaws by 2020, elimination of trachoma and lymphatic filariasis as public health problems by 2020, and intensified control of dengue, schistosomiasis, and soil-transmitted helminthiases.

Closer collaboration between WASH and NTD programmes can lead to synergies. They can be achieved through collaborative planning, delivery and evaluation of programmes, strengthening and sharing of evidence, and using monitoring tools to improve the equity of health services.

Reasons why WASH plays an important role in NTD prevention and patient care include:

- NTDs affect more than one billion people in 149 countries. They occur mainly in regions with a lack of basic sanitation. About 2.4 billion people worldwide do not have adequate sanitation facilities. 663 million do not have access to improved drinking water sources.
- A leading cause of preventable blindness is trachoma. The bacterial infection is transmitted through contact with eye-seeking flies, fingers, and fomites. Prevention components are facial cleanliness, which requires water for face washing, and environmental improvement, which includes safe disposal of excreta to reduce fly populations.
- Improved sanitation prevents soil-transmitted helminthiases. It impedes fecal pathogens such as intestinal worm eggs from contaminating the environment and infecting people through contaminated food, water, dirty hands, and direct skin contact with the soil.
- Improved sanitation and water management can contribute to reduced proliferation of mosquitoes that transmit diseases, such as lymphatic filariasis, dengue, and chikungunya. Breeding of the Culex mosquito, which transmits filarial parasites, is facilitated through poorly constructed latrines. Breeding of the Aedes aegypti and Aedes albopictus mosquitoes, which transmit dengue and chikungunya, can be prevented through safe storage of water.
- Feces and urine that contain worm eggs can contaminate surface water and lead to transmission of schistosomiasis. This can be prevented through improved sanitation. Not only human but also animal (cow, buffalo) urine or feces can transmit some schistosome species. Therefore, it is important to protect freshwater from animals and animal waste.
- Treatment of many NTDs requires clean water and hygienic conditions for healthcare facilities and households. For Guinea-worm disease, Buruli ulcer, and cutaneous leishmaniasis, wound management is needed to speed up healing and reduce disability. Lymphatic filariasis causes chronic disabilities. People who have this disease need to maintain rigorous personal hygiene with water and soap to prevent secondary infections.
- NTDs that lead to permanent disabilities make tasks such as carrying water long distances or accessing toilets difficult. However, people affected by these diseases often face stigma and can be excluded from accessing water and sanitation facilities. This increases their risk of poverty and severe illness. Clean water and soap are essential for these groups to maintain personal hygiene and dignity. Therefore, additional efforts to reduce stigma and exclusion are needed. In this manner, WASH can improve the quality of life of people affected by NTDs.
- In a meta-analysis, safe water was associated with significantly reduced odds of Schistosoma infection, and adequate sanitation was associated with significantly lower odds of infection with both S. mansoni and S. haematobium.
- A systematic review and meta-analysis showed that better hygiene in children is associated with lower odds of trachoma. Access to sanitation was associated with 15 percent lower odds of active trachoma and 33 percent lower odds of C. trachomatis infection of the eyes.
- Another systematic review and meta-analysis found a correlation between WASH access and practices, and lower odds of soil-transmitted helminthiasis infections by 33 to 77 percent. Persons who washed their hands after defecating were less than half as likely to be infected as those who did not. Traditionally, preventive chemotherapy is used as a measure of control, although this measure does not stop the transmission cycle and cannot prevent reinfection. In contrast, improved sanitation can.

=== Pharmaceutical market ===
Biotechnology companies in the developing world have targeted neglected tropical diseases due to a need to improve global health.

Mass drug administration is considered a possible method for eradication, especially for lymphatic filariasis, onchocerciasis, and trachoma, although drug resistance is a potential problem. According to Fenwick, Pfizer donated 70 million doses of drugs in 2011 to eliminate trachoma through the International Trachoma Initiative. Merck has helped The African Programme for the Control of Onchocerciasis (APOC) and Oncho Elimination Programme for the Americas to greatly diminish the effect of onchocerciasis by donating ivermectin. Merck KGaA pledged to give 200 million tablets of praziquantel, the only cure for schistosomiasis, over 10 years. GlaxoSmithKline has donated two billion tablets of medicine for lymphatic filariasis and pledged 400 million deworming tablets per year for five years in 2010. Johnson & Johnson has pledged 200 million deworming tablets per year. Novartis has pledged leprosy treatment, and EISAI pledged two billion tablets to help treat lymphatic filariasis.

=== NGO initiatives ===
Non-governmental organizations that focus exclusively on NTDs include the Schistosomiasis Control Initiative, Deworm the World, and the END Fund. Despite under-funding, treatment and prevention of many neglected diseases is cost-effective. The cost of treating a child for infection of soil-transmitted helminths and schistosomes (some of the main causes of neglected diseases) is less than US$0.50 per year when administered as part of school-based mass deworming by Deworm the World. This programme is recommended by Giving What We Can and the Copenhagen Consensus Centre as one of the most efficient and cost-effective solutions. The efforts of the Schistosomiasis Control Initiative to combat neglected diseases include the use of rapid-impact packages: supplying schools with packages including four or five drugs, and training teachers in how to administer them.

Health Action International based in Amsterdam worked with the WHO to get snakebite envenoming on the list of neglected tropical diseases.

=== Public-private initiatives ===
An alternative to the profit-driven drug development model emerged in 2000 to address the needs of these neglected patients. Product development partnerships (PDPs) aim at implementing and accelerating the research and development (R&D) of safe and effective health tools (diagnostics, vaccines, drugs) to combat neglected diseases. Drugs for Neglected Disease initiative (DNDi) is one of these PDPs that has already developed new treatments for NTDs.

The Sabin Vaccine Institute, founded in 1993, works to address the issues of vaccine-preventable diseases as well as NTDs. They run three main programs: Sabin Vaccine Development, Global Network for Neglected Tropical Diseases, and Vaccine Advocacy and Education. Their product development partnership affiliates them with the Texas Children's Hospital as well as the Baylor College of Medicine. Their major campaign, End7, aims to end seven of the most common NTDs (elephantiasis, river blindness, snail fever, trachoma, roundworm, whipworm, and hookworm) by 2020. Through End7, college campuses undertake fundraising and educational initiatives for the broader goals of the campaign.

WIPO Re:Search was established in 2011 by the World Intellectual Property Organization in collaboration with BIO Ventures for Global Health (BVGH) and with the active participation of leading pharmaceutical companies and other private and public sector research organizations. It allows organizations to share their intellectual property, compounds, expertise, facilities, and know-how royalty-free with qualified researchers worldwide working on new solutions for NTDs, malaria, and tuberculosis.

In 2013, the Government of Japan, five Japanese pharmaceutical companies, the Bill and Melinda Gates Foundation, and the UNDP established a new public–private partnership, the Global Health Innovative Technology Fund. They pledged over US$100 million to the fund over five years, to be awarded as grants to R&D partnerships across sectors in Japan and elsewhere, working to develop new drugs and vaccines for 17 neglected diseases, in addition to HIV, malaria, and tuberculosis. Affordability of the resulting drugs and vaccines is one of the key criteria for grant awards.

==== London Declaration on Neglected Tropical Diseases ====
The London Declaration on Neglected Tropical Diseases, initiated by the Bill and Melinda Gates Foundation launched on 30 January 2012 in London. Inspired by the WHO roadmap to eradicate or prevent transmission for neglected tropical diseases, it aimed to eradicate or reduce NTDs by the year 2020. It was endorsed by governments and organisations around the world, as well as major pharmaceutical companies including Abbott, AstraZeneca, Bayer HealthCare Pharmaceuticals, Becton Dickinson, Bristol-Myers Squibb, Eisai, Gilead Sciences, GlaxoSmithKline, Johnson & Johnson, Merck KGaA, Merck Sharp & Dohme, MSD, Novartis, Pfizer, and Sanofi. It was not a complete success, but millions of lives were saved, the burden of the infections was reduced, and 42 countries eliminated at least one disease. To commemorate the programme, WHO adopted 30 January as the World NTD Day.

==== Kigali Declaration on Neglected Tropical Diseases ====
The Kigali Declaration on Neglected Tropical Diseases was launched at the Kigali Summit on Malaria and Neglected Tropical Diseases (NTDs) hosted by the Government of Rwanda at its capital city Kigali on 23 June 2022. It was signed as a support for the World Health Organization's 2021–30 road map for NTDs and the target of Sustainable Development Goal 3 to end NTD epidemics; and as a follow-up project of the London Declaration . Supported by WHO, governments of the Commonwealth of Nations pledged the endorsement, along with commitments from GSK plc, Novartis, and Pfizer.

=== Others ===
An open-access journal dedicated to neglected tropical diseases called PLoS Neglected Tropical Diseases first began publication in 2007.

One of the first large-scale initiatives to address NTDs came from a collaboration between Kenneth Warren and the Rockefeller Foundation. Ken Warren is regarded as a pioneer in neglected tropical disease research. The Great Neglected Tropical Diseases Network was a consortium of scientists from all over the world, hand-picked by Warren, working to expand the research base in neglected diseases. Many of the scientists that he recruited had not been involved in NTD research before. The network ran from 1978 to 1988. Warren's vision was to establish units within biological labs across the world, dedicated to R&D. By forming a critical mass of scientists in NTD research, he hoped to attract new students into the field. The interdisciplinary group met annually to update the community on research progress. Much of the work done by this group focused on understanding the mechanisms behind infection. At these informally structured meetings, research partnerships were formed. Warren himself encouraged these partnerships, especially if they bridged the divide between developed and developing nations. Through the Great Neglected Tropical Disease Network, a great number of scientists were brought into the field of parasitology.

== Epidemiology ==
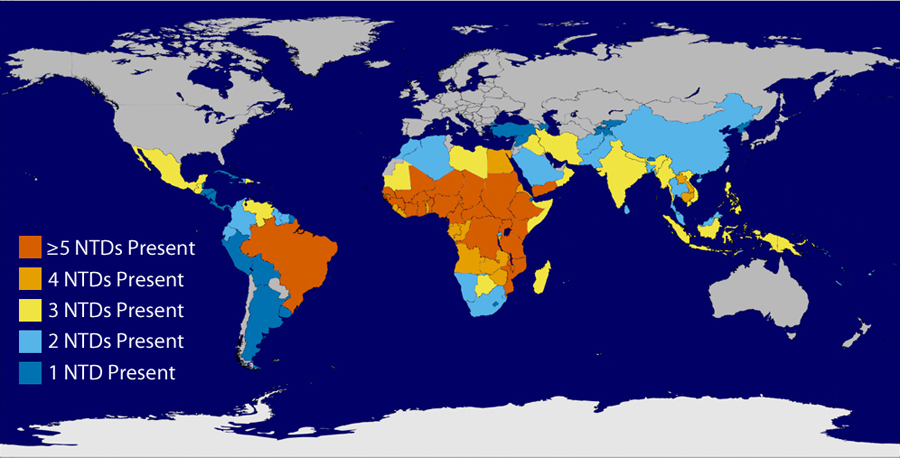
Global overlap of six of the common NTDs, specifically guinea worm disease, lymphatic filariasis, onchocerciasis, schistosomiasis, soil-transmitted helminths, and trachoma, in 2011

The distribution of neglected tropical disease disproportionally affects about one billion of the world's poorest populations, causing mortality, disability, and morbidity. Lack of funding, resources, and attention can result in treatable and preventable diseases causing death. Factors like political dynamics, poverty, and geographical conditions can make the delivery of NTD control programs difficult. Intersectional collaboration of poverty reduction policies and neglected tropical diseases creates cross-sector approaches to simultaneously address these issues.

The six most common NTDs include soil-transmitted helminths (STHs)—specifically roundworms (Ascaris lumbricoides), whipworm (Trichuris trichiura), and hookworms (Necator americanus and Ancylostoma duodenale)—schistosomiasis, trachoma, and lymphatic filariasis (LF). These diseases affect one-sixth of the world's population, with 90 percent of the disease burden occurring in sub-Saharan Africa.

Information on the frequency of neglected tropical diseases is of low quality. It is currently difficult to summarize all of the information on this family of diseases. One effort to do so is the Global Burden of Disease framework. It aims to create a standardized method of measurement. The principle components of the approach involve 1) the measuring of premature mortality as well as disability, 2) the standardized usage of DALYs (disability-adjusted life years), and 3) widespread inclusion of diseases and injury causes with the estimation of missing data. However, the DALY has been criticized as a "systematic undervaluation" of disease burden. King asserts that DALY emphasizes the individual too much while ignoring the effects of the ecology of the disease. In order for the measure to become more valid, it may have to take the context of poverty more into account. King also emphasizes that DALYs may not capture the non-linear effects of poverty on the cost-utility analysis of disease control. The Socio-Demographic Index (SDI) and Healthy Life Expectancy (HALE) are other summary measures that can be used to take into account other factors. HALE is a metric that weights years lived and health loss before death to provide a summary of population health. SDI is a measurement that includes lag-distributed income per capita, average education, and fertility rate. Socioeconomic factors greatly influence the distribution of neglected tropical diseases, and not addressing these factors in models and measurements can lead to ineffective public health policy.

== Research and development ==
The structure of two of the ivermectins, an important class of drug in the control of Onchocerciasis.

NTD interventions include programs to address environmental and social determinants of health (e.g., vector control, water quality, sanitation) as well as programs offering mass drug administration for disease prevention and treatment. Drug treatments exist to confront many of the NTDs and represent some of the world's essential medicines. Despite significant health and economic improvements using available medicines, the low number of new compounds being researched and developed for NTDs is an ongoing and significant challenge. The dearth of candidates in pharmaceutical company drug pipelines is primarily attributed to the high costs of drug development and the fact that NTDs are concentrated among the world's poor. Other disincentives to investment include weak existing infrastructure for distribution and sales as well as concerns regarding intellectual property protection. However, the major stakeholders in NTD drug development—governments, foundations, pharmaceutical companies, academia, and NGOs—are involved in activities to help address the research and development shortfall and meet the many challenges presented by neglected tropical diseases. Initiatives include public-private partnerships, global R&D capacity building, priority vouchers to speed drug approval processes, open source scientific collaborations, and harmonization of global governance structures concerning NTDs.

The diseases considered neglected tropical diseases vary. Some researchers no longer consider malaria, HIV, and tuberculosis to be neglected due to the amount of public attention and increased funding they have received. Outside "The Big Three", the seven most prevalent neglected tropical diseases in order of their global prevalence are ascariasis, trichuriasis, hookworm infection, schistosomiasis, lymphatic filariasis, and trachoma. These seven are among a larger list of thirteen major NTDs: onchocerciasis, leishmaniasis, Chagas disease, leprosy, human African trypanosomiasis (sleeping sickness), dracunculiasis, and Buruli ulcer.

=== Deficient market ===
In their 2002 review of the U.S. Food and Drug Administration (FDA) databases and the European Agency for the Evaluation of Medicinal Products, Troullier et al. found that 16 out of 1393 new chemical entities were approved for NTDs between 1975 and 1999 (~1%). Cohen et al. revisited the data and using the same methodology found 32 new chemical entities during the time period. In a second analysis using an expanded list of NTDs based on the G-FINDER survey, the number was slightly higher, with 46 new drugs and vaccines approved (~3% of the total including HIV drugs). Between 2000 and 2009, there has been some increase with an additional 26 newly approved drugs and vaccines for NTDs.

A number of factors are recognized as contributing to the low number. The barrier most reported is the high cost of drug development. Estimates are that pharmaceutical companies' development costs to approval fall between $500 million and $2 billion. DiMasi, Hansen, and Grabowski calculated an average of $802 million in year 2000 dollars. Furthermore, the time that drugs are approved for use averages seven years out of the twenty years on patent, meaning a tendency for the market to focus on diseases of developed nations where high prices can be used to recoup research and development costs, and subsidize failed R&D efforts. In short, NTD research and development is considered a high investment risk, given that NTDs predominantly affect the poor in low- and middle-income countries. Additional barriers include drug safety regulatory requirements, intellectual property protection problems, and poor infrastructure for distribution and sales.

Although drug companies have not invested heavily in NTDs, in several cases, rather than focus on profits, some have decided to donate key drugs to address NTDs. For example, Merck has had a program since the mid-1980s to donate ivermectin (Mectizan) indefinitely to support the global fight against onchocerciasis. GlaxoSmithKline and several other large pharmaceutical companies have donation programs as well. Drug donation, however, does not ameliorate the deficiency of new chemical entities being researched and developed. This is especially of concern with reports of emerging resistance among existing drugs.

=== Policy initiatives ===
==== Public–private partnerships ====
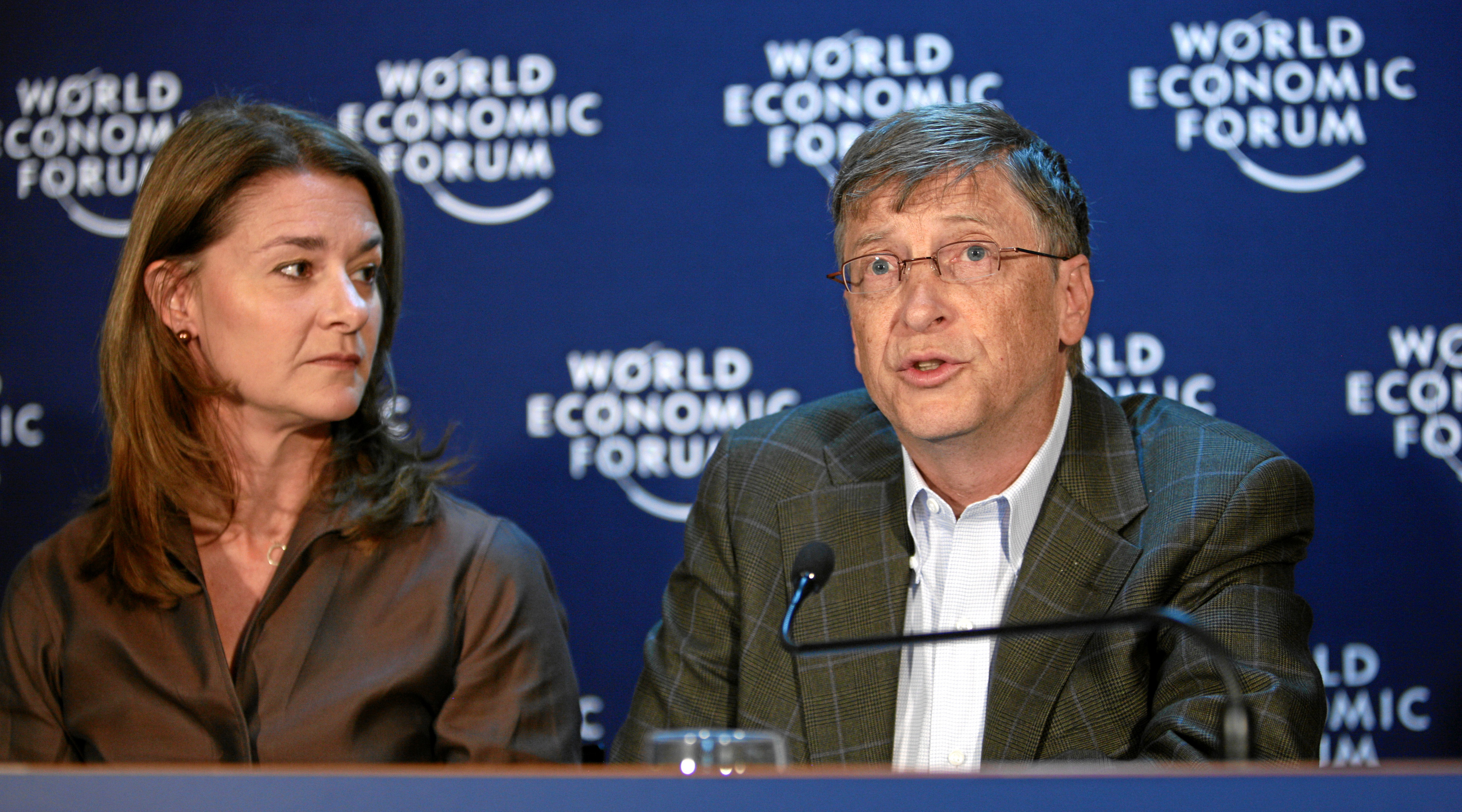
Melinda and Bill Gates speak during press conference at the World Economic Forum in Davos, Switzerland, January 30, 2009.

Governments, foundations, the non-profit sector, and the private sector have found new connections to help address market deficiencies by providing funding support and spreading both the costs and risks of NTD research and development. The proliferation of public–private partnerships (PPPs) has been recognized as a key innovation in the past decade, helping to unlock existing and new resources.

Major PPPs for NTDs include: the Sabin Vaccine Institute, Norvartis Vaccines Institute for Global Health, MSD Wellcome Trust Hilleman Laboratories, Infectious Diseases Research Institute, Institut Pasteur and INSERM, WIPO Re:Search, and the International Vaccine Institute. Likewise, a number of new academic drug development centers have been created in recent years drawing in industry partners. Support for these centers is frequently traced to the Bill & Melinda Gates Foundation, the Sandler Foundation, and the Wellcome Trust.

==== R&D capacity building in middle-income countries ====
Growing NTD research and development capacity in middle-income countries is an area of policy interest. A 2009 study of biotechnology companies in India, China, Brazil, and South Africa revealed 62 NTD products in development and on the market out of approximately 500 products offered (~14%). When products to fight HIV, malaria, and TB were included in the analysis, the number increased to 123 products, approximately 25% of the total products offered.

Researchers have argued that, unlike most multinationals, small and mid-sized "Global South" companies see significant business opportunities in the development of NTD-related diagnostics, biologics, pharmaceuticals, and services. Potential actions to improve and expand this R&D capacity have been recommended, including expansion of human capital, increased private investment, knowledge and patent sharing, infrastructure building for business incubation, and innovation support.

==== Innovation prizes and grants ====
Competitive innovation prizes have been used to spur development in a range of fields such as aerospace engineering, clean technology, and genomics. The X-Prize Foundation is launching a competition for high-speed, point-of-care diagnostics for tuberculosis. A more widely defined annual "Global Health EnterPrize" for neglected tropical diseases has been proposed to reward health innovators, particularly those based in countries where NTDs represent a serious health burden.

The Bill & Melinda Gates Foundation offers the Grand Challenges Explorations Opportunities on a rolling basis. This grant program allows individuals from any organization or background to apply to address priority global health issues. Each project award is $100,000 and is drawn from a Foundation funding pool of $100 million. Awardees have tended to offer research projects on topics that are highly speculative but offer potentially game-changing breakthroughs in global health.

==== FDA priority review vouchers (PRV) ====
In 2006, Ridley et al. recommended the development of a priority review voucher (PRV) in the journal Health Affairs. It gained interest from Senator Sam Brownback of Kansas, who championed its introduction in the FDA Amendments Act of 2007. Under the enacted law, FDA approval of a non-NTD drug can be accelerated through the drug review process if paired with a drug that addresses an NTD. The potential economic benefit to a pharmaceutical company is estimated to be potentially as high as $300 million per drug. Three drugs have earned NTD PRVs to date (December 2014): Coartem (by Novartis, for malaria); bedaquiline (by Janssen, for TB); and miltefosine (by Knight, for leishmaniasis). However, the success of the PRV system is now under much scrutiny, given that Knight benefitted by $125 million from the sale of a PRV earned from a drug (miltefosine) that was largely researched and developed by the WHO. Médecins Sans Frontières are now pressuring Knight to guarantee to supply miltefosine at cost price, thus far without success.

The PRV isn't limited to the pairing of drugs within a single company as it can be transferred between companies. Companies with NTD drug candidates in their pipelines but without a blockbuster drug are able to sell their vouchers, producing financial returns. In the EU, similar priority review incentives are now under consideration to increase the speed of regulatory pricing and reimbursement decisions.

However, PRVs have been criticized as being open to manipulation and possibly encouraging errors through too rapid regulatory decision-making.

==== Open source collaboration initiatives ====
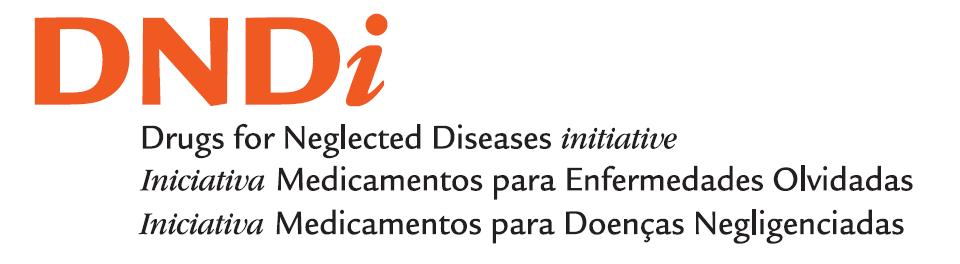
The Drugs for Neglected Diseases Initiative, a web-focused not-for-profit drug R&D organization dedicated to creating new NTD treatments.

Several companies and scientific organizations are participating in open-source initiatives to share drug data and patent information over the web, and facilitate virtual collaboration on NTD research.

One rich area to explore is the wealth of genomic data resulting from the sequencing of parasite genomes. These data offer opportunities for the exploration of new therapeutic products using computational and open-source collaboration methods for drug discovery. The Tropical Disease Initiative, for example, has used large amounts of computing power to generate the protein structures for ten parasite genomes. An open-source drug bank was matched algorithmically to determine compounds with protein interaction activity, and two candidates were identified. In general, such methods may hold important opportunities for off-label use of existing approved drugs.

== History ==
In 1977, Kenneth S. Warren, an American researcher, invented the concept of what is now "neglected tropical diseases". In 2005 Lorenzo Savioli, a senior United Nations civil servant, was appointed director of the "Department of Control of Neglected Tropical Diseases".

The World Health Organization definition of neglected tropical disease has been criticised to be restrictive and described as a form of epistemic injustice.

== See also ==
- Contagious disease
- Fecal–oral route transmission
- Neglected Tropical Disease Research and Development
- Drugs for Neglected Diseases Initiative
- Eradication of infectious diseases
- Global Network for Neglected Tropical Diseases
- Orphan diseases
