= Global Network for Neglected Tropical Diseases =

Organization

- Founded: 2006
- Founder: Sabin Vaccine Institute
- Type: NGO
- Purpose: Neglected Tropical Diseases
- Location: Washington, D.C.
- Key people: Peter Hotez Ciro de Quadros Neeraj Mistry
- Website: www.sabin.org/programs/global-network-neglected-tropical-diseases-0

The Global Network for Neglected Tropical Diseases is an advocacy initiative of the Sabin Vaccine Institute dedicated to raising the awareness, political will, and funding necessary to control and eliminate the most common Neglected Tropical Diseases (NTDs)—a group of disabling, disfiguring, and deadly diseases affecting more than 1.4 billion people worldwide living on less than $1.25 a day.

The Global Network provides an advocacy platform for the broad NTD community that reaches the attention of policymakers, philanthropists, thought leaders, and the general public. Through that platform, the Global Network highlights the work—including implementation, research, advocacy, and policy efforts—of the NTD community at the local, national, and international levels.

The Global Network collaborates closely with the World Health Organization and other technical agencies, NGOs, donors, and the broader public health community; together they support international organizations, governments, and afflicted communities that work through regional strategies to advocate for and implement NTD control and elimination programs.

== History ==
At the September 2006 Clinton Global Initiative Annual Meeting, former U.S. President Bill Clinton announced the launch of The Global Network for Neglected Tropical Diseases—the first-ever global effort to combat NTDs in an integrated framework. At the time, NTD control was seen as a monumental task, with 1.4 billion people infected with and suffering from NTDs around the world. Over the last decade, several organizations on the ground had made significant progress on individual diseases, but reaching more people in need of treatment in a cost-effective way required an integrated approach to combating NTDs collectively.

Since its launch, the Global Network for Neglected Tropical Diseases has expanded its activities in resource mobilization and advocacy aimed at controlling NTDs globally. Through collaborations with partner organizations, large populations in low-income settings have received access to low-cost packages of essential NTD medications.

== Neglected tropical diseases ==
Neglected tropical diseases (NTDs) are a group of 13 parasitic and bacterial infections that infect approximately 1.4 billion of the world’s poorest people in sub-Saharan Africa, Latin America and the Caribbean, and South East Asia. Together, they disable, disfigure, blind, and even kill, causing chronic morbidity that is on par with the “big three” global health threats: HIV/AIDS, tuberculosis, and malaria.

The Global Network focuses on the seven most common NTDs that together represent 90% of the total NTD disease burden. These seven are:

1. Ascariasis (roundworm) – 807 million infected
2. Trichuriasis (whipworm) – 604 million infected
3. Hookworm – 576 million infected
4. Schistosomiasis (snail fever) – 207 million infected
5. Lymphatic Filariasis (elephantiasis) – 120 million infected
6. Trachoma (blinding trachoma) – 84 million infected
7. Onchocerciasis (river blindness) – 37 million infected
