= Mundo Sano =

Argentine scientific organization

- Founded: 1993
- Founder: Dr Roberto Gold
- Type: Corporate donor
- Purpose: Parasitic diseases Public Health
- Location: Buenos Aires, Añatuya, Clorinda, Iguazú, Pampa del Indio, Tartagal, Argentina
- Region served: South America; Spain; Africa
- Method: Research; Technology Transfer
- Executive Director: Silvia Gold
- Website: http://www.mundosano.org

Mundo Sano (Spanish for "healthy world"), or Fundación Mundo Sano, is a scientific, nongovernmental foundation in Argentina working for the prevention and control of communicable diseases such as dengue fever, Chagas disease, malaria, leishmaniasis and soil-transmitted helminthiasis. Its main objective is to facilitate equal access to health and welfare among people who are vulnerable to these otherwise avoidable diseases, mainly by promoting strategic policies for the improvement of the quality of life of affected communities.

Mundo Sano was originally established to combat against Chagas disease that is prevalent in Latin America, and was transmitted to other parts of the world from there. Expanding its mission, the foundation now plays an active part in the international coalition including the Bill & Melinda Gates Foundation, the World Bank, the World Health Organization and the major pharmaceutical companies that coordinate the world's largest project to control neglected diseases. It has funded numerous research programmes in the field, and also involved in development of new drugs, especially Abarax.

== History ==
Mundo Sano Foundation was founded in 1993 by Dr Roberto Gold with the aim of improving of the quality of life in Argentina, where human helminthic diseases were rampant. Initially as a family enterprise, the foundation's main focus was on Chagas disease and its consequences throughout the continent. The disease still affects an estimated 8 to 10 Latin Americans, who are at constant threats of cardiac and gastrointestinal complications. Gold and his wife, Dr Miriam Turjanski, as pioneer pharmacists in Argentina, were inspired from their pharmaceutical activities and commitment towards societyn, and this urged Gold to create a foundation through which suffering from the infectious disease could be eliminated.

In 2000 the foundation was strengthened with a broader view on other parasitic diseases, and a proper organisation of the management was formulated. As imposed by the guidelines laid down by the founder, Gold's daughter, Dr Silvia Gold became the president to enforce more extensive research and intervention programmes.

== Achievements ==
=== Tropical diseases ===
Mundo Sano has devoted its effort to eliminate tropical diseases. It forms many partnerships such as with the Global Network for Neglected Tropical Diseases to fight Strongyloides stercoralis infections and other soil-transmitted helminths (STH) in Argentina.

Mundo Sano played an active role in the London Declaration on Neglected Tropical Diseases of 30 January 2012, the largest collaborative disease eradication programme till date. The project aims to eradicate or control 10 neglected tropical diseases by 2020. Mundo Sano specifically contributed US$5 million for project expansion and program enhancement for selected sites in the Americas and Africa.

=== Bendznidazole ===
Benznidazole is the primary treatment of choice for Chagas disease, is produced in Latin America where the disease originates and is most prevalent, at the public pharma LAFEPE in Brasil. Mundo Sano and the Chemo Pharmaceutical Group developed a second generic version of benznidazole, which is manufactured by the Argentine company Laboratorio ELEA under the name Abarax. On 20 March 2012, the Argentine Minister of Health, Dr Juan Manzur triumphantly announced the first ever production of benzinidazole in Argentina.

In 2017, August 29 the U.S. Food and Drug Administration (FDA) approved Chemo Research's New Drug Application (NDA) for benznidazole 567891011 . This is the first drug ever approved by the FDA to treat Chagas disease. The FDA's decision approves benznidazole for children ages 2–12 years old 12. Mundo Sano played a central role in registering benznidazole with the U.S. Food and Drug Administration (FDA), in close collaboration with Exeltis (Chemo US-based pharmaceutical division), with the support of the Drugs for Neglected Diseases initiative (DNDi), a non-profit drug development organization.

=== Literature ===
Mundo Sano funded the free publication and distribution of a book Contar La Ciencia (Telling Science) in 2012. The book is an anthology of 40 science articles in Argentina, published by the Argentine Network of Science Journalism to be the first ever of its kind published in Latin America.
