= WASH =

Water, sanitation and hygiene services

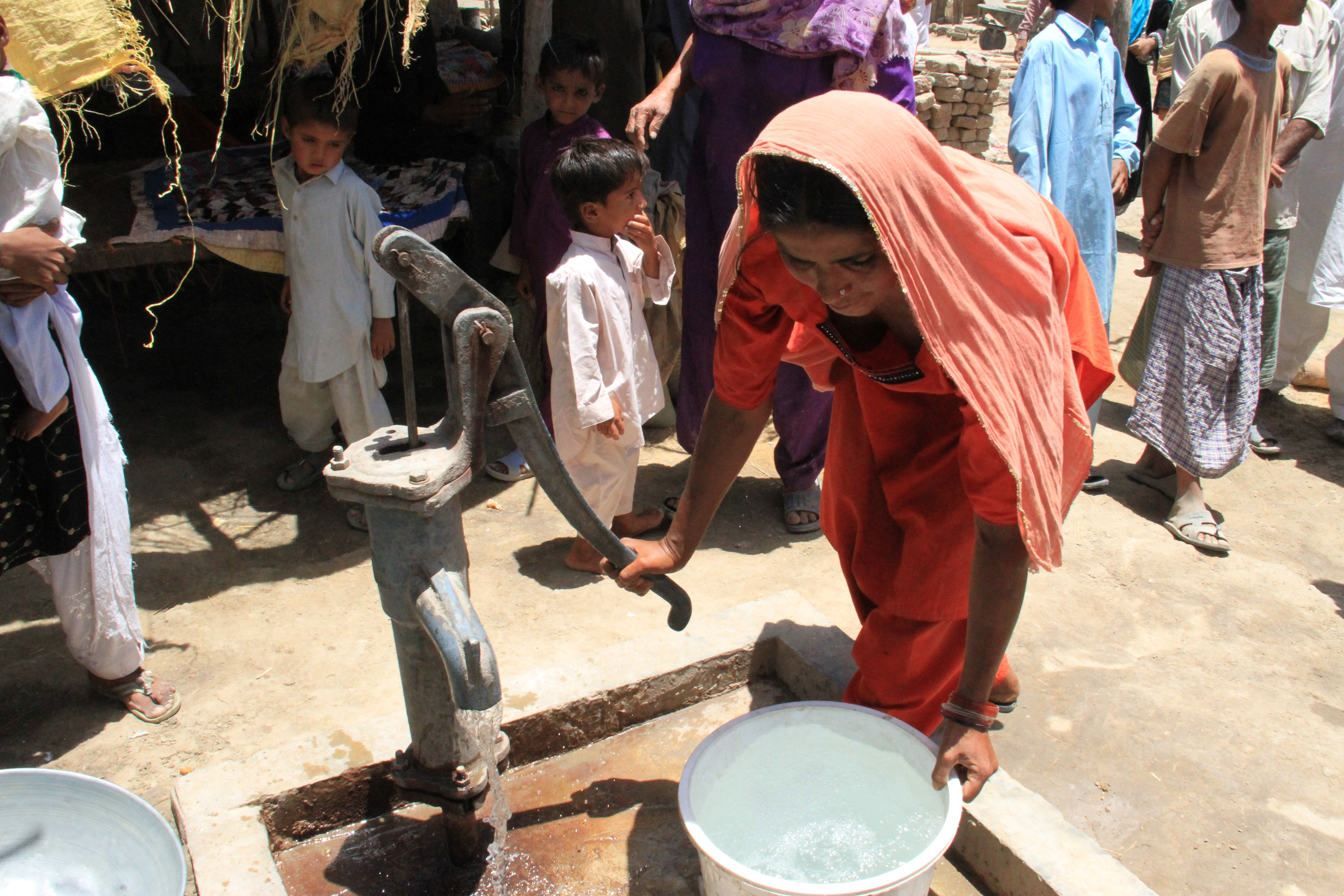
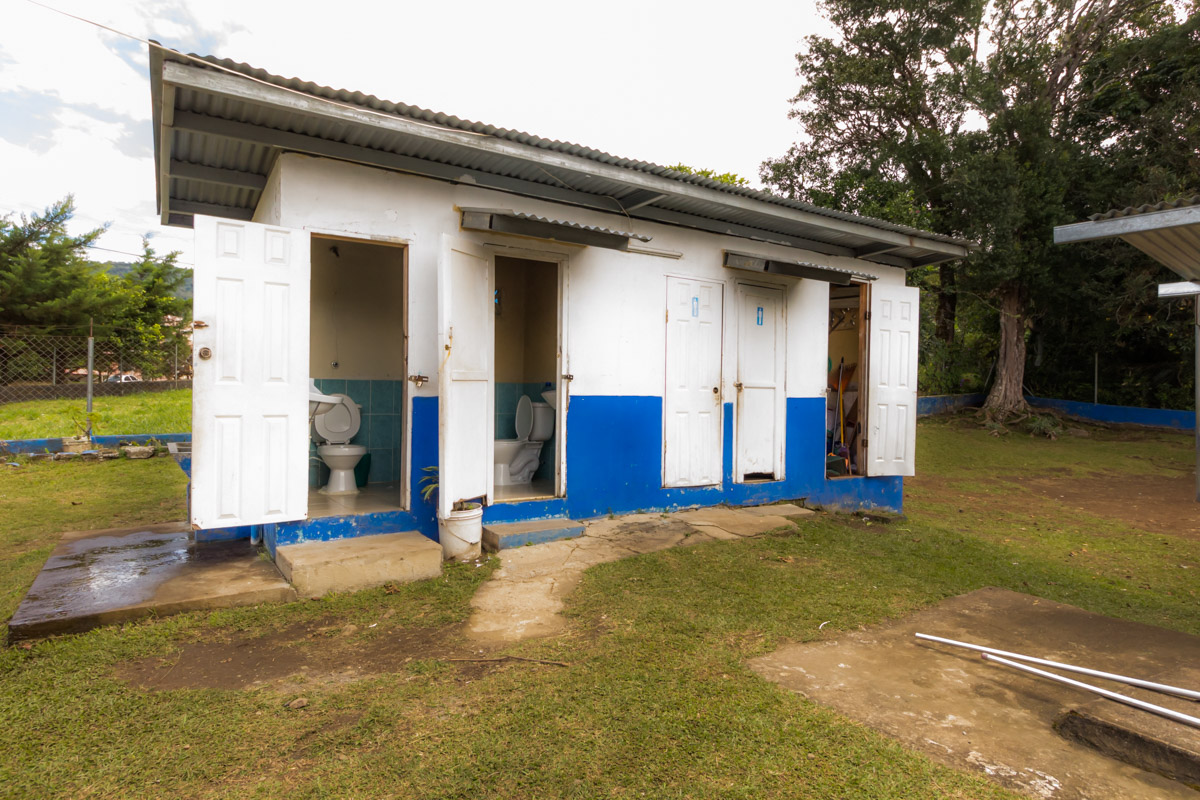
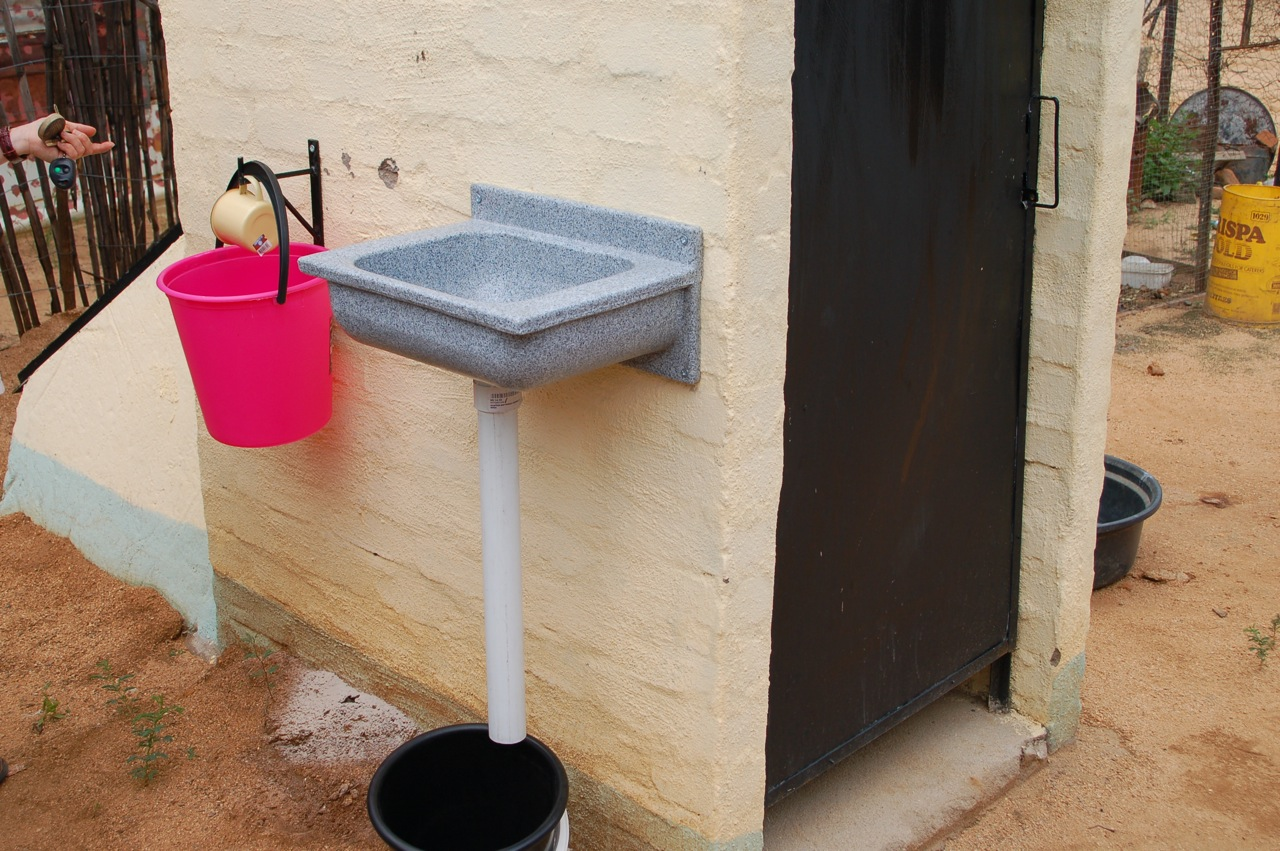
WASH consists of water, sanitation, and hygiene: a woman pumps water from a handpump in her village in Sindh, Pakistan (top left); school toilets at an elementary school in Boquete, Panama (top right); a simple handwashing setup for when there is no running water, shown in Omaruru, Namibia (bottom).

WASH (or WatSan, WaSH; stemming from the first letters of "water, sanitation and hygiene") is a sector in development cooperation, or within local governments, that provides water, sanitation, and hygiene services to communities. The main purposes of providing access to WASH services are to achieve public health gains, implement the human right to water and sanitation, reduce the burden of collecting drinking water for women, and improve education and health outcomes at schools and healthcare facilities. Access to WASH services is an important component of water security. Universal, affordable, and sustainable access to WASH is a key issue within international development, and is the focus of the first two targets of Sustainable Development Goal 6 (SDG 6). Targets 6.1 and 6.2 aim for equitable and accessible water and sanitation for all. In 2017, it was estimated that 2.3 billion people live without basic sanitation facilities, and 844 million people live without access to safe and clean drinking water. The acronym WASH is used widely by non-governmental organizations and aid agencies in developing countries.

The WASH-attributable burden of disease and injuries has been studied in depth. Typical diseases and conditions associated with a lack of WASH include diarrhea, malnutrition, and stunting, in addition to neglected tropical diseases. There are additional health risks for women, for example, during pregnancy and birth, or in connection with menstrual hygiene management. Chronic diarrhea can have long-term negative effects on children in terms of both physical and cognitive development. Still, collecting precise scientific evidence regarding health outcomes that result from improved access to WASH is difficult due to a range of complicating factors. Scholars suggest a need for longer-term studies of technological efficiency, greater analysis of sanitation interventions, and studies of the combined effects of multiple interventions to better analyze WASH health outcomes.

Access to WASH is required not only at the household level but also in non-household settings like schools, healthcare facilities, workplaces, prisons, temporary use settings and for dislocated populations. In schools, group handwashing facilities can improve hygiene. Lack of WASH facilities at schools often causes female students to not attend school, thus reducing their educational achievements.

It is difficult to provide safely managed WASH services in urban slums. WASH systems can also fail quite soon after installation (e.g., leaking water distribution systems). Further challenges include polluted water sources and the impacts of climate change on water security. Planning approaches for more reliable and equitable access to WASH include, for example, national WASH plans and monitoring, women's empowerment, and improving the climate resilience of WASH services. Adaptive capacity in water management systems can help to absorb some of the impacts of climate-related events and increase climate resilience. Stakeholders at various scales, for example, from small urban utilities to national governments, need to have access to reliable information about the regional climate and any expected changes due to climate change.

== Components ==
The WASH concept groups together the various aspects of water supply, including access to drinking water services, sanitation, and hygiene because the impact of deficiencies in each area overlap strongly.

=== Drinking water services ===
Share without improved water

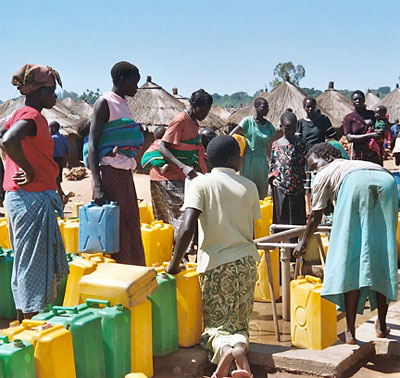
Women line up at a bore hole to fill their containers with water (Labuje IDP camp, Kitgum, Kitgum District, Northern Region of Uganda)

WHO and UNICEF state that a safe drinking water service is one that is located in an accessible location, available when needed, and uncontaminated. Additionally, WHO and UNICEF use the terms improved water source and unimproved water source as a water quality monitoring tool. The term "improved water source" refers to piped water on premises. Examples include a piped household water connection located inside the user's dwelling plot or yard, and other improved drinking water sources such as public taps or standpipes, tube wells or boreholes, protected dug wells, protected springs, and rainwater collection.

Access to drinking water is included in Target 6.1 of Sustainable Development Goal 6 (SDG 6), which states: "By 2030, achieve universal and equitable access to safe and affordable drinking water for all." This target's single indicator, Indicator 6.1.1, which states "Proportion of population using safely managed drinking water services." In 2017, 844 million people still lacked even a basic drinking water service. In 2019, it was reported that 435 million people used unimproved sources for their drinking water, and 144 million still used surface water, such as lakes and streams.

Drinking water can be sourced from the following water sources: surface water, groundwater, or rainwater, in each case after collection, treatment, and distribution. Desalinated seawater is another potential source for drinking water.

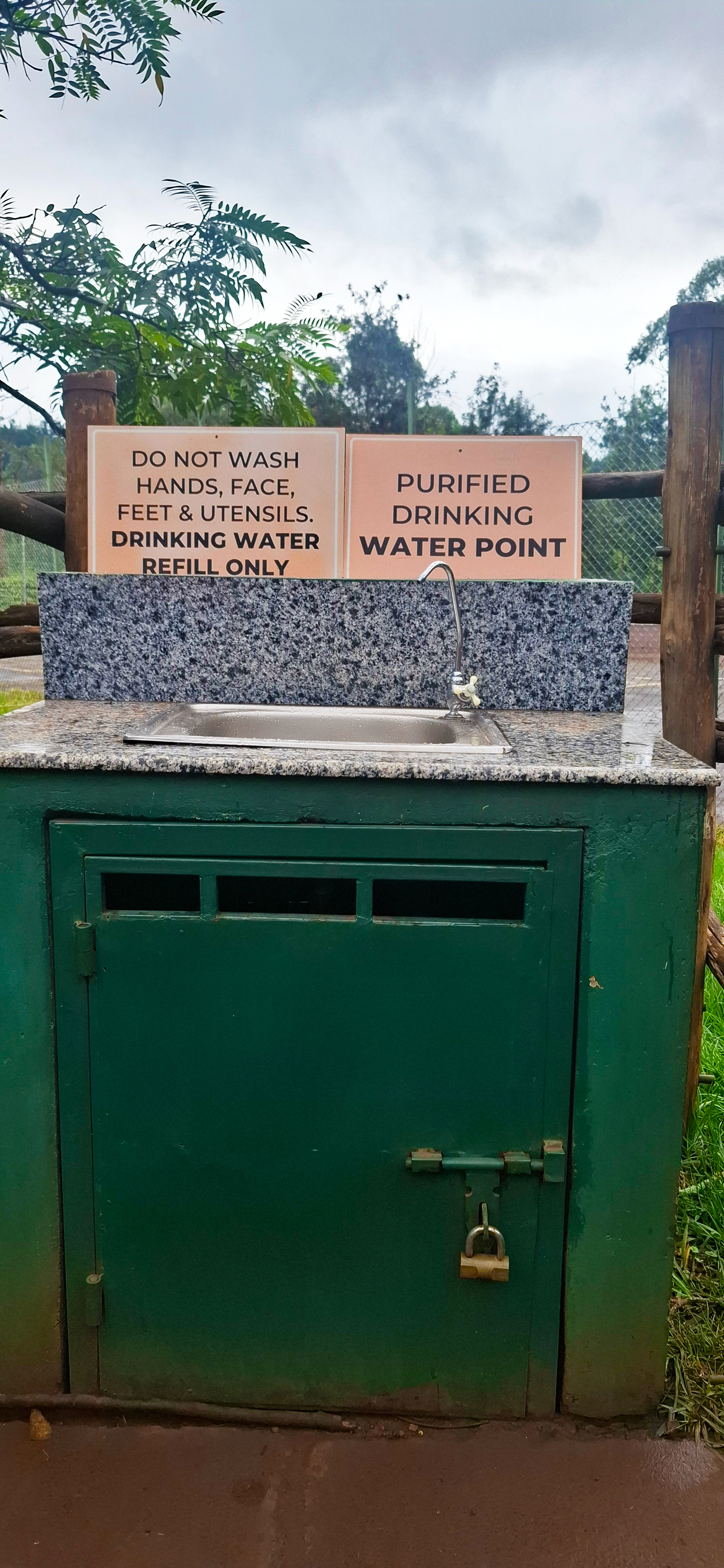
Purified drinking water in Karura Forest in Nairobi, Kenya

People without access to safe, reliable, domestic water supplies face lower water security at specific times throughout the year due to cyclical changes in water quantity or quality. For example, where access to water on-premises is not available, drinking water quality at the point of use (PoU) can be much worse compared to the quality at the point of collection (PoC). Correct household practices around hygiene, storage, and treatment are therefore important. There are interactions between weather, water source, and management, and these in turn impact drinking water safety.

==== Groundwater ====
Groundwater provides critical freshwater supply, particularly in dry regions where surface water availability is limited. Globally, more than one-third of the water used originates from underground. In the mid-latitude arid and semi-arid regions lacking sufficient surface water supply from rivers and reservoirs, groundwater is critical for sustaining global ecology and meeting societal needs of drinking water and food production. The demand for groundwater is rapidly increasing with population growth, while climate change is imposing additional stress on water resources and raising the probability of severe drought occurrence.

The anthropogenic effects on groundwater resources are mainly due to groundwater pumping and the indirect effects of irrigation and land use changes.

Groundwater plays a central role in sustaining water supplies and livelihoods in sub-Saharan Africa. In some cases, groundwater is an additional water source that was not used previously.

Reliance on groundwater is increasing in sub-Saharan Africa as development programs work towards improving water access and strengthening resilience to climate change. Lower-income areas typically install groundwater supplies without water quality treatment infrastructure or services. The assumption that untreated groundwater is typically suitable for drinking due to its relative microbiological safety compared to surface water underpins this practice, largely disregarding chemistry risks. Chemical contaminants occur widely in groundwater sources that are used for drinking but are not regularly monitored. Example priority parameters are fluoride, arsenic, nitrate, or salinity.

=== Sanitation services ===
Sanitation systems are grouped into several types. The ladder of sanitation services includes (from lowest to highest): open defecation, unimproved, limited, basic, safely managed. A distinction is made between sanitation facilities that are shared between two or more households (a "limited service") and those that are not shared (a "basic service"). The definition of improved sanitation facilities is facilities designed to hygienically separate excreta from human contact.

With regard to toilets, improved sanitation includes the following types of toilets: flush toilet, connections to a piped sewer system, septic systems, pour-flush pit latrines, pit latrines with slabs, ventilated improved pit latrines, and composting toilets.

Access to sanitation services is included in Target 6.2 of Sustainable Development Goal 6, which is: "By 2030, achieve access to adequate and equitable sanitation and hygiene for all and end open defecation, paying special attention to the needs of women and girls and those in vulnerable situations." This target has one indicator: Indicator 6.2.1 which states "proportion of population using (a) safely managed sanitation services and (b) a hand-washing facility with soap and water".

In 2017, 4.5 billion people did not have toilets at home that could safely manage waste, despite improvements in access to sanitation over the past decades. Approximately 600 million people share a toilet or latrine with other households, and 892 million people practice open defecation.

There are many barriers that make it difficult to achieve sanitation for all. These include social, institutional, technical and environmental challenges. Therefore, the problem of providing access to sanitation services cannot be solved by focusing on technology alone. Instead, it requires an integrated perspective that includes planning, using economic opportunities (e.g. from reuse of excreta), and behavior change interventions.

==== Fecal sludge management and sanitation workers ====
Sanitation services would not be complete without safe fecal sludge management (FSM), which is the storage, collection, transport, treatment, and safe end use or disposal of fecal sludge. Fecal sludge is defined very broadly as what accumulates in onsite sanitation systems (e.g. pit latrines, septic tanks and container-based solutions) and specifically is not transported through a sewer. Sanitation workers are the people needed for cleaning, maintaining, operating, or emptying a sanitation technology at any step of the sanitation chain.

=== Hygiene ===
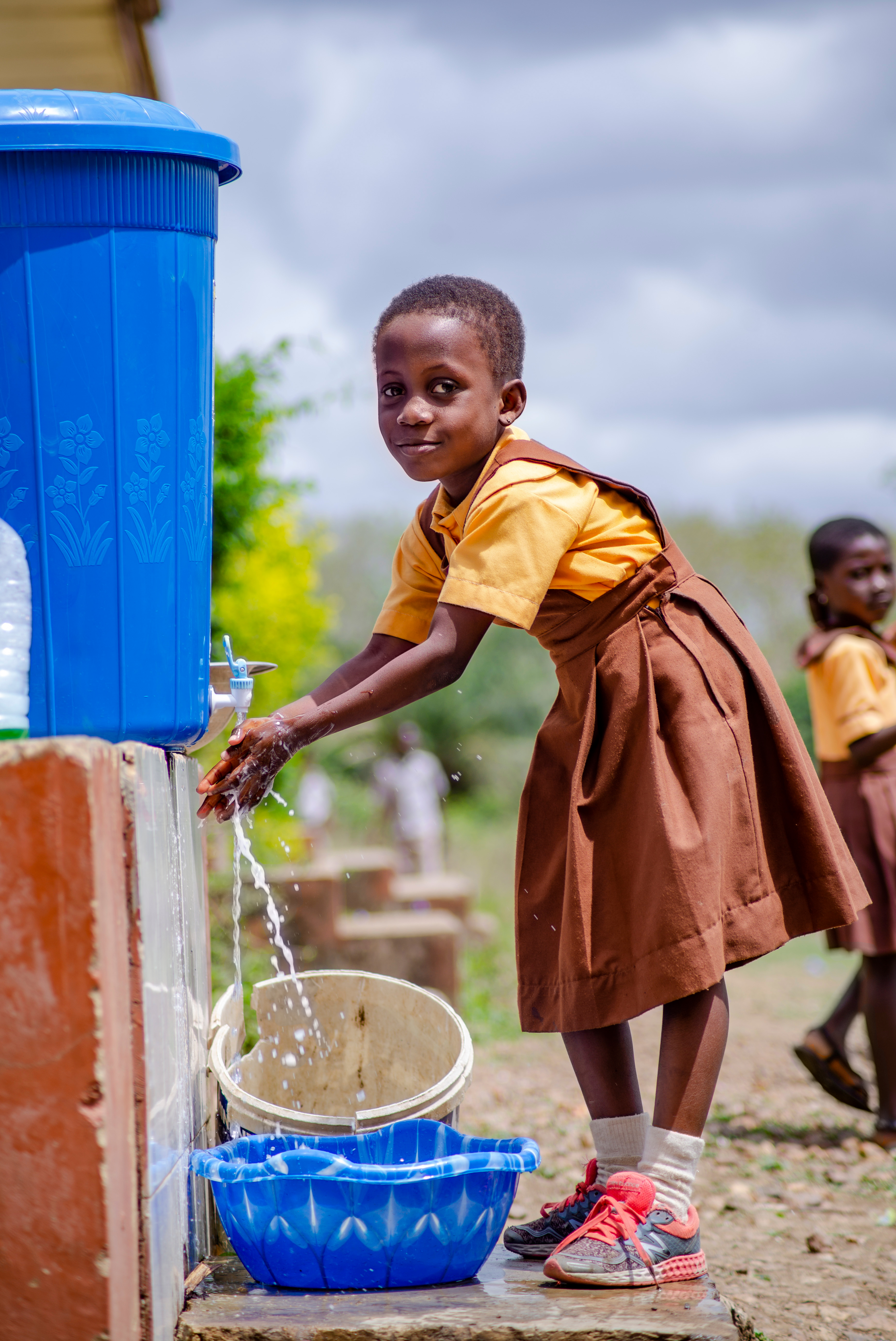
A schoolgirl using a Veronica Bucket in Ghana for washing her hands.

Hygiene is a broad concept. "Hygiene refers to conditions and practices that help to maintain health and prevent the spread of diseases." Hygiene can comprise many behaviors, including hand washing, menstrual hygiene and food hygiene. In the context of WASH, hand washing with soap and water is regarded as a top priority in all settings and has been chosen as an indicator for national and global monitoring of hygiene access. "Basic hygiene facilities" are those where people have a hand washing facility with soap and water available on their premises. Hand washing facilities can consist of a sink with tap water, buckets with taps, tippy-taps, and portable basins.

In the context of SDG 6, hygiene is included in the indicator for Target 6.2: "Proportion of population using [...] (b) a hand-washing facility with soap and water"

In 2017, the global situation was reported as follows: Only 1 in 4 people in low-income countries had hand washing facilities with soap and water at home; only 14% of people in Sub-Saharan Africa have hand washing facilities. Worldwide, at least 500 million women and girls lack adequate, safe, and private facilities for managing menstrual hygiene.

Approximately 40% of the world's population live without basic hand washing facilities with soap and water at home.

== Purposes ==
The purposes of providing access to WASH services include achieving public health gains, improving human dignity in the case of sanitation, implementing the human right to water and sanitation, reducing the burden of collecting drinking water for women, reducing risks of violence against women, improving education and health outcomes at schools and health facilities, and reducing water pollution. Access to WASH services is also an important component of achieving water security.

Improving access to WASH services can improve health, life expectancy, student learning, gender equality, and other important issues of international development. It can also assist with poverty reduction and socioeconomic development.

== Health aspects of lack of WASH services ==
Mortality rate attributable to unsafe water, sanitation, and hygiene (WASH).

The "F-diagram" (feces, fingers, flies, fields, fluids, food), showing pathways of fecal–oral disease transmission. The vertical blue lines show barriers: toilets, safe water, hygiene and hand washing.

=== Categories of health impacts ===
Health impacts resulting from a lack of safe sanitation systems fall into three categories:

1. Direct impact (infections): The direct impacts include fecal–oral infections (through the fecal–oral route), helminth infections and insect vector diseases (see also waterborne diseases, which can contaminate drinking water). For example, lack of clean water and proper sanitation can result in feces-contaminated drinking water and cause life-threatening diarrhea for infants.
2. Sequela (conditions caused by preceding infection): These impacts include stunting or growth faltering, consequences of stunting (obstructed labour, low birth weight), impaired cognitive function, pneumonia (related to repeated diarrhea in undernourished children), and anemia (related to hookworm infections).
3. Broader well-being: Including anxiety, sexual assault (and related consequences), adverse birth outcomes as well as long-term problems such as school absence, poverty, decreased economic productivity, and antimicrobial resistance.

=== WASH-attributable burden of diseases and injuries ===
The WHO has investigated which proportion of death and disease worldwide can be attributed to insufficient WASH services. In their analysis they focus on the following four health outcomes: diarrhea, acute respiratory infections, malnutrition, and soil-transmitted Helminthiasis (STHs). These health outcomes are also included as an indicator for achieving Sustainable Development Goal 3 ("Good Health and Well-being"): Indicator 3.9.2 reports on the "mortality rate attributed to unsafe water, sanitation, and lack of hygiene".

In 2023, WHO summarized the available data with the following key findings: "In 2019, use of safe WASH services could have prevented the loss of at least 1.4 million lives and 74 million disability-adjusted life years (DALYs) from four health outcomes. This represents 2.5% of all deaths and 2.9% of all DALYs globally." Of the four health outcomes studied, it was diarrheal disease that had the most striking correlation, namely the highest number of "attributable burden of disease": over 1 million deaths and 55 million DALYs from diarrheal diseases were linked with lack of WASH. Of these deaths, 564,000 deaths were linked to unsafe sanitation in particular.

Acute respiratory infections were the second largest cause of WASH-attributable burden of disease in 2019, followed by malnutrition and soil-transmitted helminthiasis. The latter does not lead to such high death numbers (in comparison) but is fully connected to unsafe WASH; its "population-attributable fraction" is estimated to be 100%.

The connection between lack of WASH and burden of disease is primarily one of poverty and poor access in developing countries: "the WASH-attributable mortality rates were 42, 30, 4.4 and 3.7 deaths per 100 000 population in low-income, lower-middle income, upper-middle income and high-income countries, respectively." The regions most affected are in the WHO Africa and South-East Asia regions. Here, between 66% and 76% of the diarrheal disease burden could be prevented if access to safe WASH services was provided.

Most of the diseases resulting from lack of sanitation have a direct relation to poverty. For example, open defecation – which is the most extreme form of "lack of sanitation" – is a major factor in causing various diseases, most notably diarrhea and intestinal worm infections.

An earlier report by World Health Organization which analyzed data up to 2016 had found higher values: "The WASH-attributable disease burden amounts to 3.3% of global deaths and 4.6% of global DALYs. Among children under 5 years, WASH-attributable deaths represent 13% of deaths and 12% of DALYs. Worldwide, 1.9 million deaths and 123 million DALYs could have been prevented in 2016 with adequate WASH." An even earlier study from 2002 had estimated even higher values, namely that up to 5 million people die each year from preventable waterborne diseases. These changes in the estimates of death and disease can partly be explained by the progress that has been achieved in some countries in improving access to WASH. For example, several large Asian countries (China, India, Indonesia) have managed to increase the "safely managed sanitation services" in their country from the year 2015 to 2020 by more than 10% points.

=== List of diseases ===
There are at least the following twelve diseases which are more likely to occur when WASH services are inadequate:

- Diarrheal diseases
- Respiratory infections
- Soil-transmitted helminth infections
- Malaria
- Trachoma
- Schistosomiasis
- Lymphatic filariasis
- Onchocerciasis
- Dengue
- Japanese encephalitis
- Protein–energy malnutrition
- Drowning

There are also other diseases where adverse health outcomes are likely to be linked to inadequate WASH but which are not yet quantified. These include for example:

- Arsenicosis
- Fluorosis
- Legionellosis
- Leptospirosis
- Hepatitis A and Hepatitis E
- Cyanobacterial toxins
- Lead poisoning
- Scabies
- Spinal injury
- Poliomyelitis
- Neonatal conditions (see also infant mortality) and maternal outcomes (such as maternal deaths)
- Other diseases, e.g. most neglected tropical diseases

=== Diarrhea, malnutrition and stunting ===
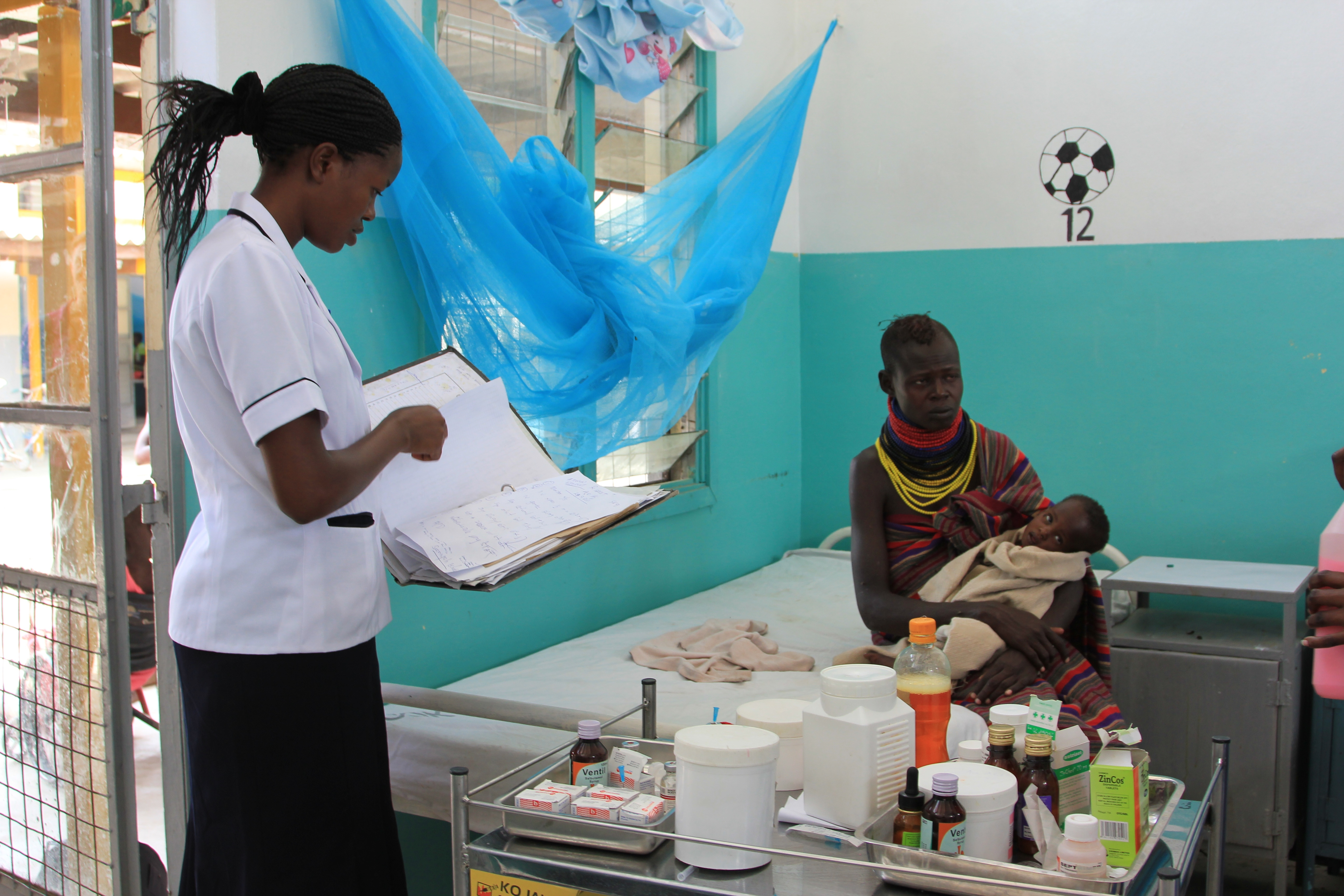
A child receiving malnutrition treatment in Northern Kenya

Diarrhea is primarily transmitted through fecal–oral routes. In 2011, infectious diarrhea resulted in about 0.7 million deaths in children under five years old and 250 million lost school days. This equates to about 2000 child deaths per day. Children suffering from diarrhea are more vulnerable to become underweight (due to stunted growth). This makes them more vulnerable to other diseases such as acute respiratory infections and malaria. Chronic diarrhea can have a negative effect on child development (both physical and cognitive).

Numerous studies have shown that improvements in drinking water and sanitation (WASH) lead to decreased risks of diarrhea. Such improvements might include for example, the use of water filters, provision of high-quality piped water and sewer connections. Diarrhea can be prevented - and the lives of 525,000 children annually be saved (estimate for 2017) - by improved sanitation, clean drinking water, and hand washing with soap. In 2008 the same figure was estimated as 1.5 million children.

The combination of direct and indirect deaths from malnutrition caused by unsafe water, sanitation and hygiene (WASH) practices was estimated by the World Health Organization in 2008 to lead to 860,000 deaths per year in children under five years of age. The multiple inter-dependencies between malnutrition and infectious diseases make it very difficult to quantify the portion of malnutrition that is caused by infectious diseases which are in turn caused by unsafe WASH practices. Based on expert opinions and a literature survey, researchers at WHO arrived at the conclusion that approximately half of all cases of malnutrition (which often leads to stunting) in children under five is associated with repeated diarrhea or intestinal worm infections as a result of unsafe water, inadequate sanitation or insufficient hygiene.

=== Neglected tropical diseases ===
Water, sanitation and hygiene interventions help to prevent many neglected tropical diseases (NTDs), for example soil-transmitted helminthiasis. Approximately two billion people are infected with soil-transmitted helminths worldwide. This type of intestinal worm infection is transmitted via worm eggs in feces which in turn contaminate soil in areas where sanitation is poor. An integrated approach to NTDs and WASH benefits both sectors and the communities they are aiming to serve. This is especially true in areas that are endemic with more than one NTD.

Since 2015, the World Health Organization (WHO) has a global strategy and action plan to integrate WASH with other public health interventions in order to accelerate elimination of NTDs. The plan aimed to intensify control or eliminate certain NTDs in specific regions by 2020. It refers to the NTD roadmap milestones that included, for example, eradication of dracunculiasis by 2015 and of yaws by 2020, elimination of trachoma and lymphatic filariasis as public health problems by 2020, intensified control of dengue, schistosomiasis and soil-transmitted helminthiases. The plan consists of four strategic objectives: improving awareness of benefits of joint WASH and NTD actions; monitoring WASH and NTD actions to track progress; strengthening evidence of how to deliver effective WASH interventions; and planning, delivering and evaluating WASH and NTD programs with involvement of all stakeholders.

=== Additional health risks for women ===
Women tend to face a higher risk of diseases and illness due to limited WASH access. In their third trimester, pregnant women face severe hardship walking to and from a water collection site. The consumption of unclean water leading to infection in the fetus accounts for 15% of deaths for women during pregnancy globally. Illnesses and diseases that can come from poor menstrual hygiene management become more likely when clean water and toilets are unavailable. In Bangladesh and India, women rely on old cloths to absorb menstrual blood and use water to clean and reuse them. Without access to clean water and hygiene, these women my experience unnecessary health problems in connection with their periods.

=== Health risks for sanitation workers ===
Occupational safety and health issues for sanitation workers include: diseases related to contact with the excreta; injuries related to the physical effort of extracting and transporting the waste, including falls from height; injuries related to cuts from non-fecal waste (e.g. glass or needles) disposed of down the toilet. There are also the general dangers of working in confined spaces, including lack of oxygen.

Many sanitation workers in developing countries work without any form of personal protective equipment (PPE) and no or minimal formal training. Physical and medical conditions directly associated with sanitation work that is carried out unsafely can include: "headaches, dizziness, fever, fatigue, asthma, gastroenteritis, cholera, typhoid, hepatitis, polio, cryptosporidiosis, schistosomiasis, eye and skin burn and other skin irritation, musculoskeletal disorders (including back pain), puncture wounds and cuts, blunt force".

=== Effects of climate change on health risks ===
Global climate change can increase the health risks for some of the infectious diseases mentioned above. See below in the section on negative impacts of climate change.

=== Effectiveness of WASH interventions on health outcomes ===
There is debate in the academic literature about the effectiveness on health outcomes when implementing WASH programs in low- and middle-income countries. Many studies provide poor quality evidence on the causal impact of WASH programs on health outcomes of interest. The nature of WASH interventions is such that high quality trials, such as randomized controlled trials (RCTs), are expensive, difficult and in many cases not ethical. Causal impact from such studies are thus prone to being biased due to residual confounding. Blind studies of WASH interventions also pose ethical challenges and difficulties associated with implementing new technologies or behavioral changes without the knowledge of the involved participants. Moreover, scholars suggest a need for longer-term studies of technology efficacy, greater analysis of sanitation interventions, and studies of combined effects from multiple interventions in order to more sufficiently gauge WASH health outcomes.

Many scholars have attempted to summarize the evidence of WASH interventions from the limited number of high quality studies. Hygiene interventions, in particular those focusing on the promotion of handwashing, appear to be especially effective in reducing morbidity. A meta-analysis of the literature found that handwashing interventions reduced the relative risk of diarrhea by approximately 40%. Similarly, handwashing promotion has been found to be associated with a 47% decrease in morbidity. However, a challenge with WASH behavioral intervention studies is an inability to ensure compliance with such interventions, especially when studies rely on self-reporting of disease rates. This prevents researchers from concluding a causal relationship between decreased morbidity and the intervention. For example, researchers may conclude that educating communities about handwashing is effective at reducing disease, but cannot conclude that handwashing reduces disease. Point-of-use water supply and point-of-use water quality interventions also show similar effectiveness to handwashing, with those that include provision of safe storage containers demonstrating increased disease reduction in infants.

Specific types of water quality improvement projects can have a protective effect on morbidity and mortality. A randomized control trial in India concluded that the provision of chlorine tablets for improving water quality led to a 75% decreased incidence of cholera among the study population. A quasi-randomized study on historical data from the United States also found that the introduction of clean water technologies in major cities was responsible for close to half the reduction in total mortality and over three-quarters of the reduction in infant mortality. Distributing chlorine products, or other water disinfectants, for use in the home may reduce instances of diarrhea. However, most studies on water quality improvement interventions suffer from residual confounding or poor adherence to the mechanism being studied. For instance, a study conducted in Nepal found that adherence to the use of chlorine tablets or chlorine solution to purify water was as low as 18.5% among program households. A study on a water well chlorination program in Guinea-Bissau in 2008 reported that families stopped treating water within their households because of the program which consequently increased their risk of cholera. It was concluded that well chlorination without proper promotion and education led to a false sense of security.

Studies on the effect of sanitation interventions alone on health are rare. When studies do evaluate sanitation measures, they are mostly included as part of a package of different interventions. A pooled analysis of the limited number of studies on sanitation interventions suggest that improving sanitation has a protective effect on health. A UNICEF funded sanitation intervention (packaged into a broader WASH intervention) was also found to have a protective effect on under-five diarrhea incidence but not on household diarrhea incidence.

== Gender aspects of lack of WASH services ==
Women and girls are particularly burdened from lack of proper WASH services. Inadequate access to water and sanitation affect women and girls in several ways because of social norms in some cultures that position them as principal household water collectors and managers, the inability to urinate easily outside of an unclean stall or where no toilets are nearby, and due to the effects of menstruation beginning during puberty. These effects include low participation in the labor market and community activities, adverse biomedical outcomes, psychosocial stress, and poor educational outcomes. Women and girls often bear higher health and social costs associated with water and sanitation insecurity than men and boys, such as higher exposure to water-related disease, discriminatory taboos, and unrealized economic productivity.

=== Time required to collect water ===
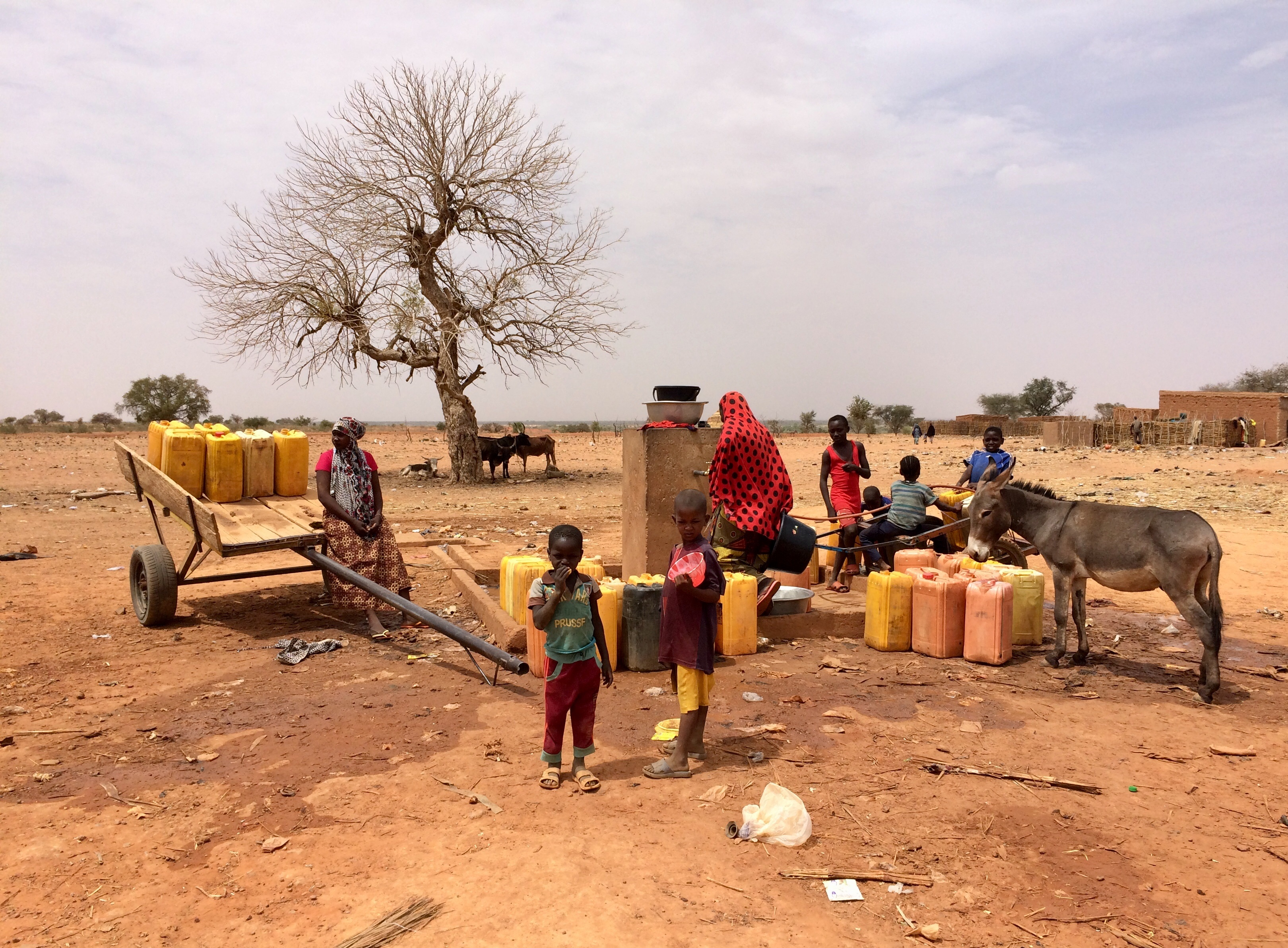
Women and children collecting water from a water well in Niger.

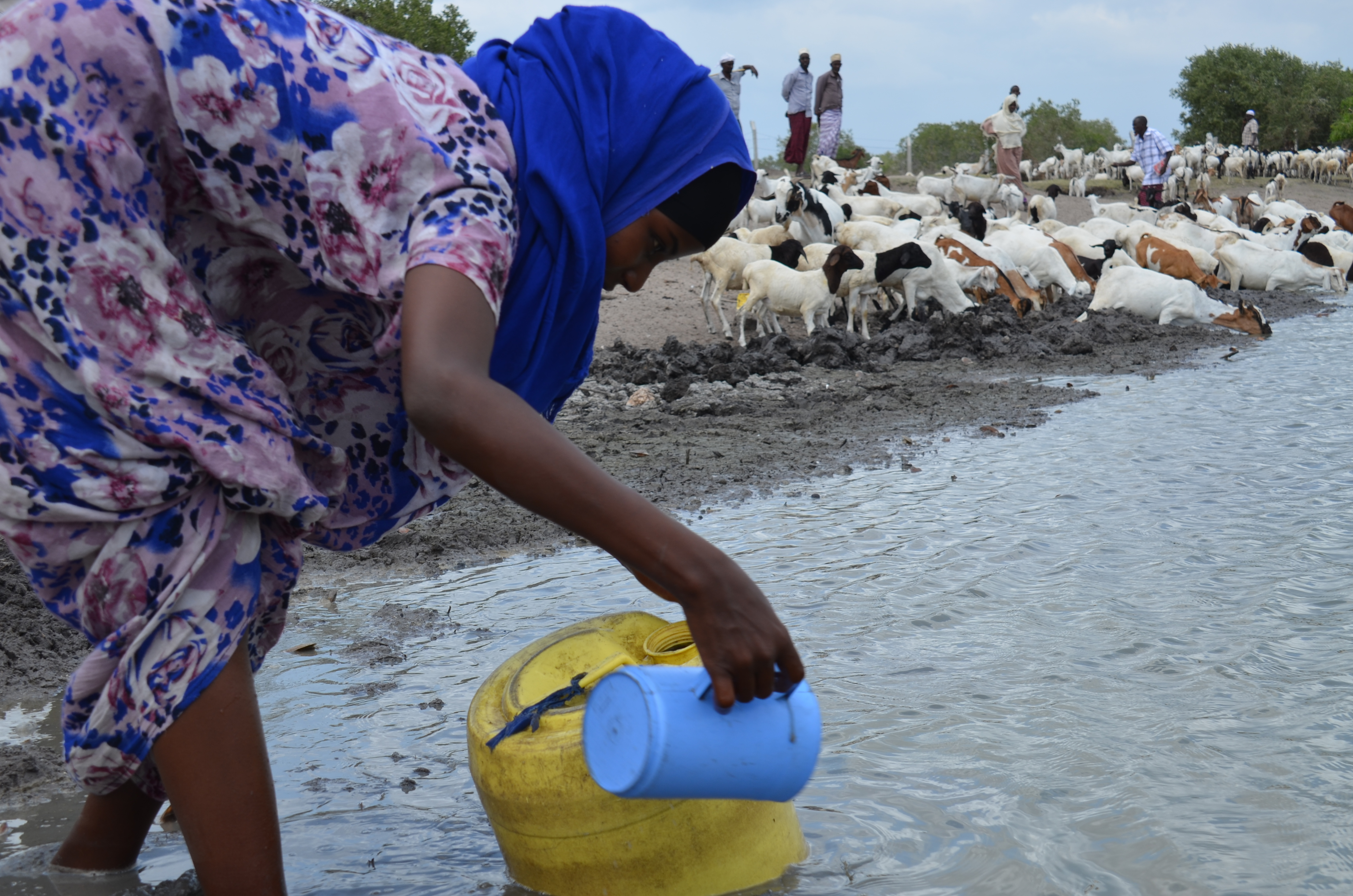
Woman collecting water in Kenya.

The lack of accessible, sufficient, clean and affordable water supply has adverse impacts specifically related to women in developing nations. It is estimated that 263 million people worldwide spent over 30 minutes per round trip to collect water from an improved source. In sub-Saharan Africa, women and girls carry water containers for an average of three miles each day, spending 40 billion hours per year on water collection (walking to the water source, waiting in line, walking back). The time to collect water can come at the expense of education, income generating activities, cultural and political involvement, and rest and recreation. For example, in low-income areas of Nairobi, women carry 44 pound containers of water back to their homes, taking anywhere between an hour and several hours to wait and collect the water.

In many places of the world, getting and providing water is considered "women's work," so gender and water access are intricately linked. Water gathering and supply to family units remains primarily a woman's task in less developed countries where water gathering is considered a main chore. This water work is also largely unpaid household work based on patriarchal gender norms and often related to domestic work, such as laundry, cooking and childcare. Areas that rely on women to primarily collect water include countries in Africa, South Asia and in the Middle East.

=== Violence against women ===
Women and girls usually bear the responsibility for collecting water, which is often very time-consuming and arduous, and can also be dangerous for them. Women and girls who collect water may also face physical assault and sexual assault along the way (violence against women). This includes vulnerability to rape when collecting water from distant areas, domestic violence over the amount of water collected, and fights over scarce water supply. A study in India, for example, found that women felt intense fear of sexual violence when accessing water and sanitation services. A similar study in Uganda also found that women reported to feel a danger for their security whilst journeying to toilets, particularly at night.

=== Gender norms for occupations ===
Gender norms can negatively affect how men and women access water through such behavior expectations along gender lines—for example, when water collection is a woman's chore, men who collect water may face discrimination for performing perceived women's work. Women are likely to be deterred from entering water utilities in developing countries because "social norms prescribe that it is an area of work that is not suitable for them or that they are incapable of performing well". Nevertheless, a study by World Bank in 2019 has found that the proportion of female water professionals has grown in the past few years.

In many societies, the task of cleaning toilets falls to women or children, which can increase their exposure to disease.

== In non-household settings ==
Non-household settings for WASH include the following six types: schools, health care facilities, workplaces (including prisons), temporary use settings, mass gatherings, and dislocated populations.

=== In schools ===
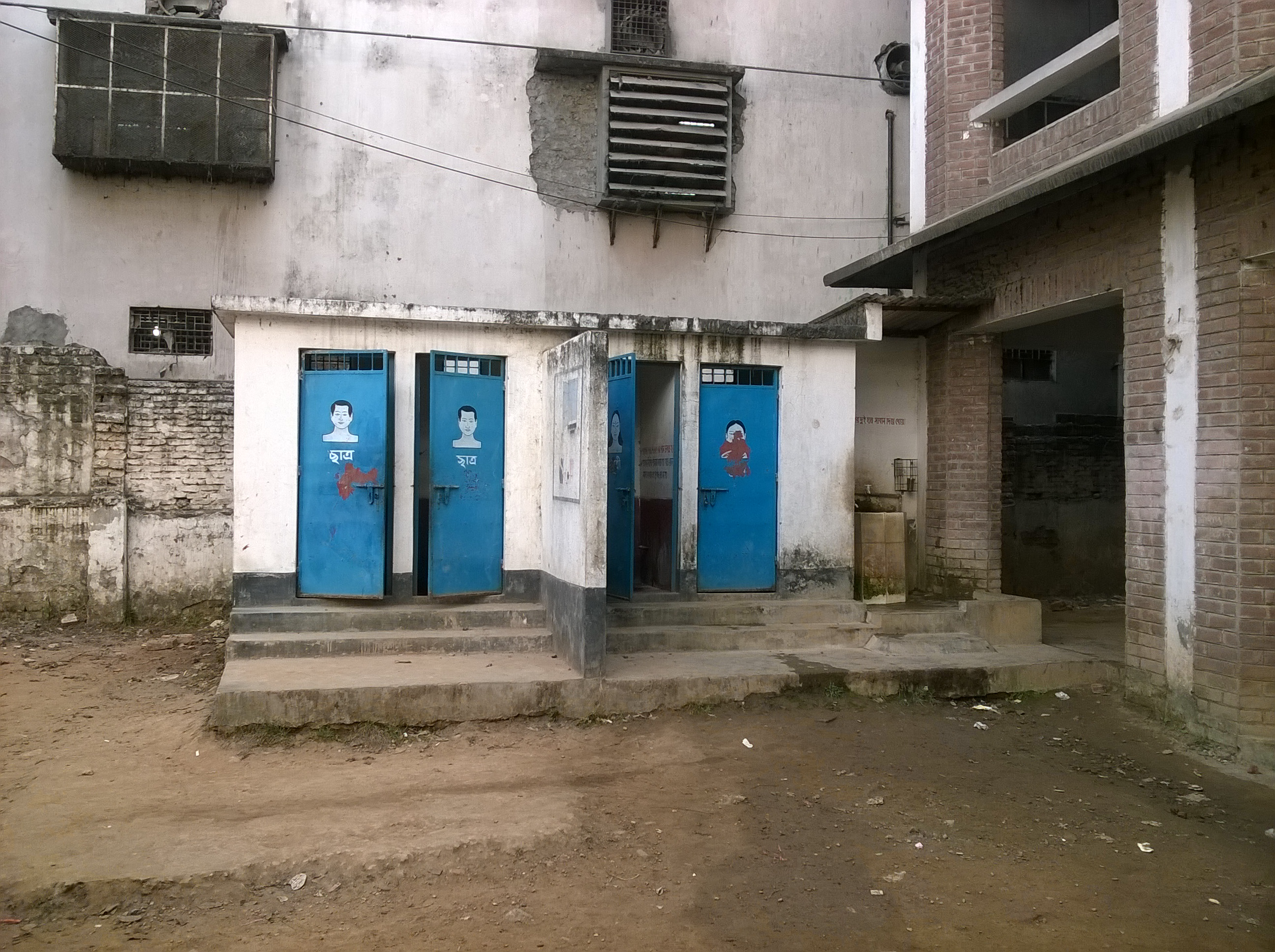
School toilets at Shaheed Monumia government secondary school, Tejgaon, Dhaka, Bangladesh)

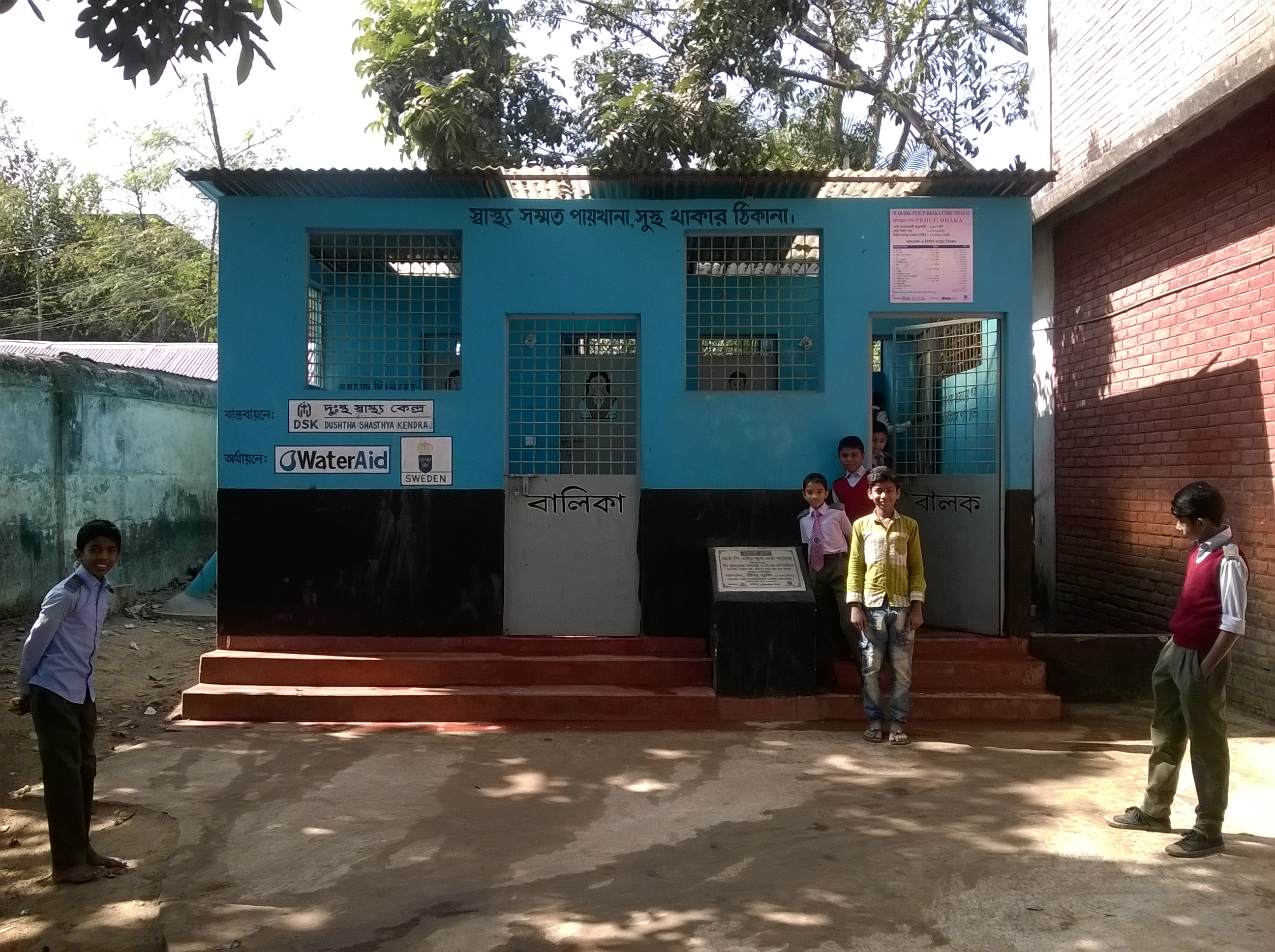
School toilet at IPH school and college, Mohakhali, Dhaka, Bangladesh)

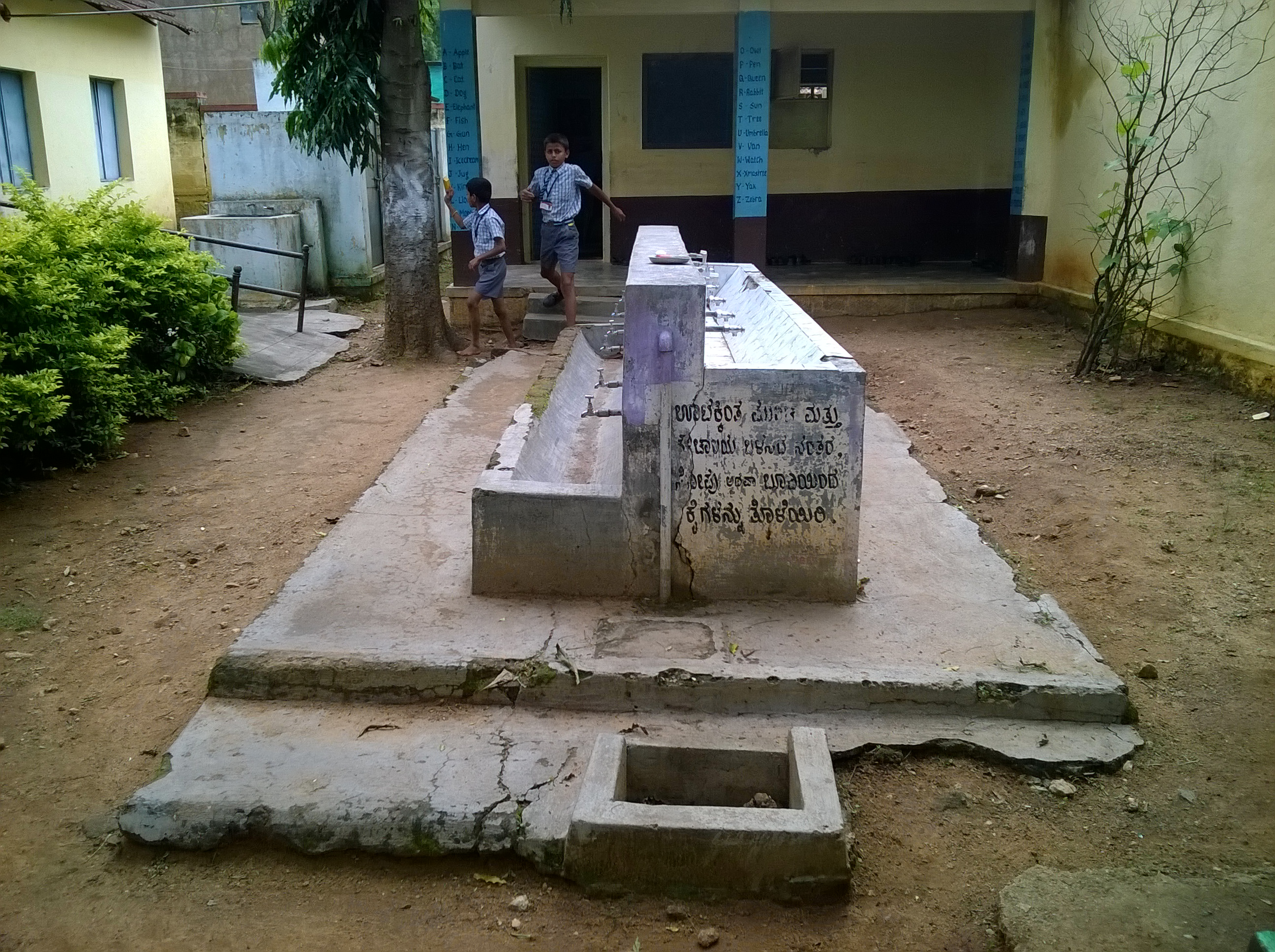
Handwashing stands at a school in Mysore district, Karnataka, India

More than half of all primary schools in the developing countries with available data do not have adequate water facilities and nearly two thirds lack adequate sanitation. Even where facilities exist, they are often in poor condition. Children are able to more fully participate in school when there is improved access to water.

Lack of WASH facilities can prevent students from attending school, particularly female students. Strong cultural taboos around menstruation, which are present in many societies, coupled with a lack of Menstrual Hygiene Management services in schools, results in girls staying away from school during menstruation.

Reasons for missing or poorly maintained water and sanitation facilities at schools in developing countries include lacking intersectoral collaboration; lacking cooperation between schools, communities and different levels of government; as well as a lack in leadership and accountability.

==== Outcomes from improved WASH at schools ====
WASH in schools, sometimes called SWASH or WinS, significantly reduces hygiene-related disease, increases student attendance and contributes to dignity and gender equality. WASH in schools contributes to healthy, safe and secure school environments. It can also lead to children becoming agents of change for improving water, sanitation and hygiene practices in their families and communities.

For example, data from over 10,000 schools in Zambia was analyzed in 2017 and confirmed that improved sanitation provision in schools was correlated with high female-to-male enrollment ratios, and reduced repetition and drop-out ratios, especially for girls.

==== Methods to improve WASH in schools ====
Methods to improve the situation of WASH infrastructure at schools include, on a policy level: broadening the focus of the education sector, establishing a systematic quality assurance system, distributing and using funds wisely. Other practical recommendations include: have a clear and systematic mobilization strategy, support the education sector to strengthen intersectoral partnerships, establish a constant monitoring system which is located within the education sector, educate the educators and partner with the school management.

The support provided by development agencies to the government at national, state and district levels is helpful to gradually create what is commonly referred to as an enabling environment for WASH in schools.

Success also hinges on local-level leadership and a genuine collective commitment of school stakeholders towards school development. This applies to students and their representative clubs, headmaster, teachers and parents. Furthermore, other stakeholders have to be engaged in their direct sphere of influence, such as: community members, community-based organizations, educations official, local authorities.

==== Group handwashing ====
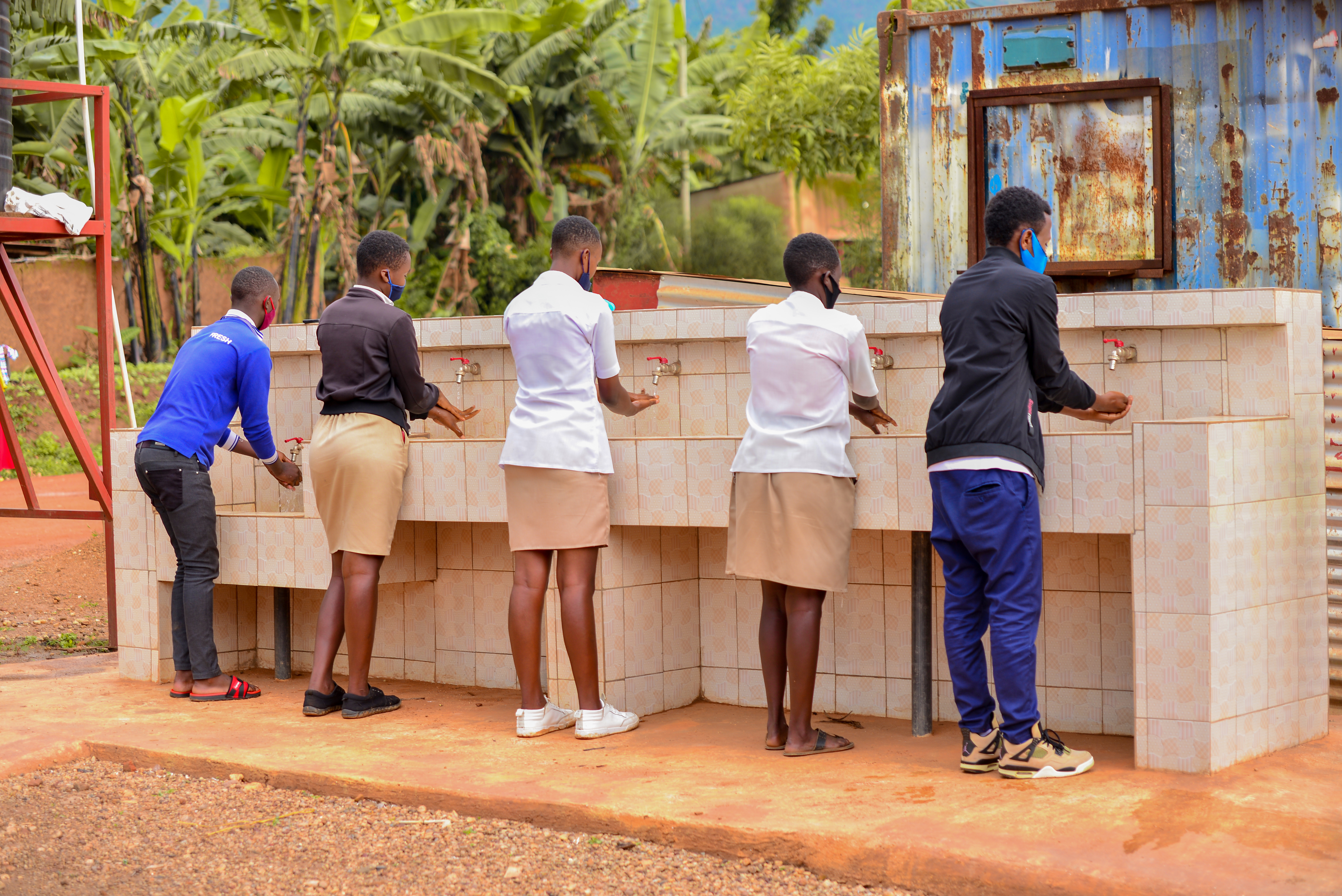
A community handwashing facility in Rwanda with sinks for people of different heights. During the COVID-19 pandemic in Rwanda handwashing was part of a system of public health measures encouraged to reduce transmission.

Supervised daily group handwashing in schools is an effective strategy for building good hygiene habits, with the potential to lead to positive health and education outcomes for children. This has for example been implemented in the "Essential Health Care Program" by the Department of Education in the Philippines. Mass deworming twice a year, supplemented by washing hands daily with soap and brushing teeth daily with fluoride, is at the core of this national program. It has also been successfully implemented in Indonesia.

=== In healthcare facilities ===
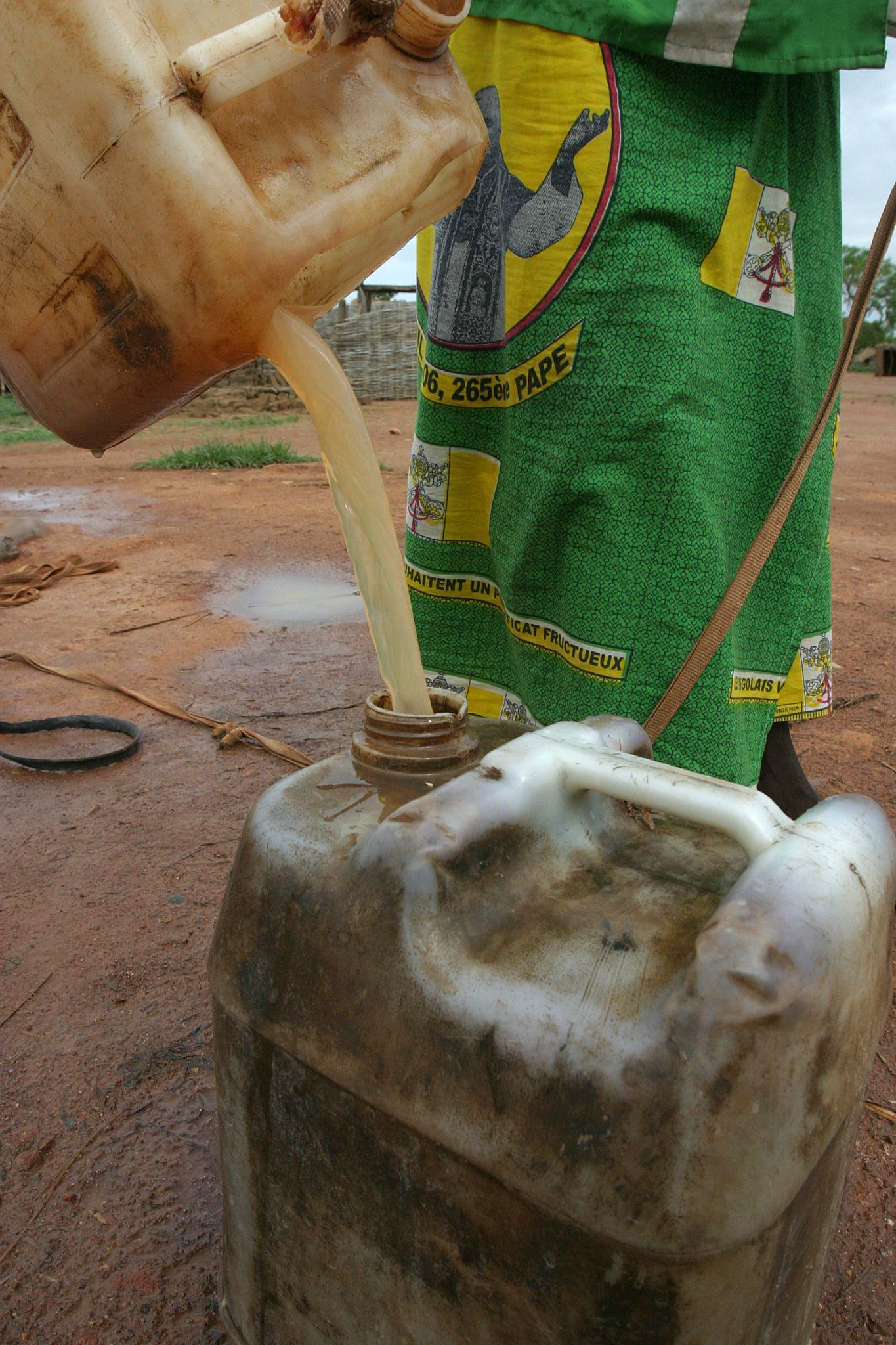
A woman is filling a jerrycan with unsafe drinking water at the Boromata well in Central African Republic.

The provision of adequate water, sanitation and hygiene is an essential part of providing basic health services in healthcare facilities. WASH in healthcare facilities aids in preventing the spread of infectious diseases as well as protects staff and patients. WASH services in health facilities in developing countries are currently often lacking.

According to the World Health Organization, data from 54 countries in low and middle income settings representing 66,101 health facilities show that 38% of health care facilities lack improved water sources, 19% lack improved sanitation while 35% lack access to water and soap for handwashing. The absence of basic WASH amenities compromises the ability to provide routine services and hinders the ability to prevent and control infections. The provision of water in health facilities was the lowest in Africa, where 42% of healthcare facilities lack an improved source of water on-site or nearby. The provision of sanitation is lowest in the Americas with 43% of health care facilities lacking adequate services.

In 2019, WHO estimated that: "One in four health care facilities lack basic water services, and one in five have no sanitation service – impacting 2.0 and 1.5 billion people, respectively." Furthermore, it is estimated that "health care facilities in low-income countries are at least three times as likely to have no water service as facilities in higher resource settings". This is thought to contribute to the fact that maternal sepsis is twice as great in developing countries as it is in high income countries.

Barriers to providing WASH in health care facilities include: Incomplete standards, inadequate monitoring, disease-specific budgeting, disempowered workforce, poor WASH infrastructure.

The improvement of WASH standards within health facilities needs to be guided by national policies and standards as well as an allocated budget to improve and maintain services. A number of solutions exist that can considerably improve the health and safety of both patients and service providers at health facilities:

- Availability of safe water for drinking but also for use in surgery and childbirth deliveries, food preparation, bathing and showering: There is a need for improved water pump systems within health facilities.
- Improved handwashing practices among healthcare staff must be implemented. This requires functional hand washing stations at strategic points of care within the health facilities, i.e. at points of care and at toilets.
- Waste system management: Proper health care waste management and the safe disposal of excreta and waste water is crucial to preventing the spread of disease.
- Hygiene promotion for patients, visitors and staff.
- Accessible and clean toilets, separated by gender, in sufficient numbers for staff, patients and visitors.

Improving access to hand washing and sanitation facilities in healthcare settings will significantly reduce infection and mortality rates, particularly in maternal and child health.

=== In prisons ===
In developing countries, prison buildings are very often overcrowded and dilapidated. A report by ICRC states that "Measures depriving persons of their freedom must in no way, whatever the circumstances, be made more severe by treatment or material conditions of detention which undermine the dignity and the rights of the individual."The water supply systems and sanitary facilities in prisons are often insufficient to meet the needs of the prison population in cases where the number of detainees exceeds a prison's capacity. Overuse of the facilities results in rapid deterioration.

The budget allocated by the State for prisons is often insufficient to cover the detainees' needs in terms of food and medical care, let alone upkeep of water and sanitation facilities. Nevertheless, even with limited funds, it is possible to maintain or renovate decaying infrastructure with the right planning approaches and suitable low-cost water supply and sanitation options.

== Challenges in WASH implementation ==
=== Equitable access to drinking water supply ===
There are inequalities in access to water, sanitation and hygiene services. Such inequalities are for example related to income level and gender. In 2019 in 24 countries where disaggregated data was available, basic water coverage among the richest wealth quintile was at least twice as high as coverage among the poorest quintile. For example, in Bangladesh, minority ethnic groups have lower levels of access to WASH than the rest of the Bengali population. This is due to "structural racial discrimination" in Bangladesh.

Access to WASH services also varies internally within nations depending on socioeconomic status, political power, and level of urbanization. In 2004 it was found that urban households are 30% and 135% more likely to have access to improved water sources and sanitation respectively, as compared to rural areas.

The human rights to water and sanitation prohibit discrimination on the grounds of "race, color, sex, language, religion, political or other opinion, national or social origin, property, birth, disability or other status". These are all dimensions of inequality in WASH services.

=== Urban low income areas ===
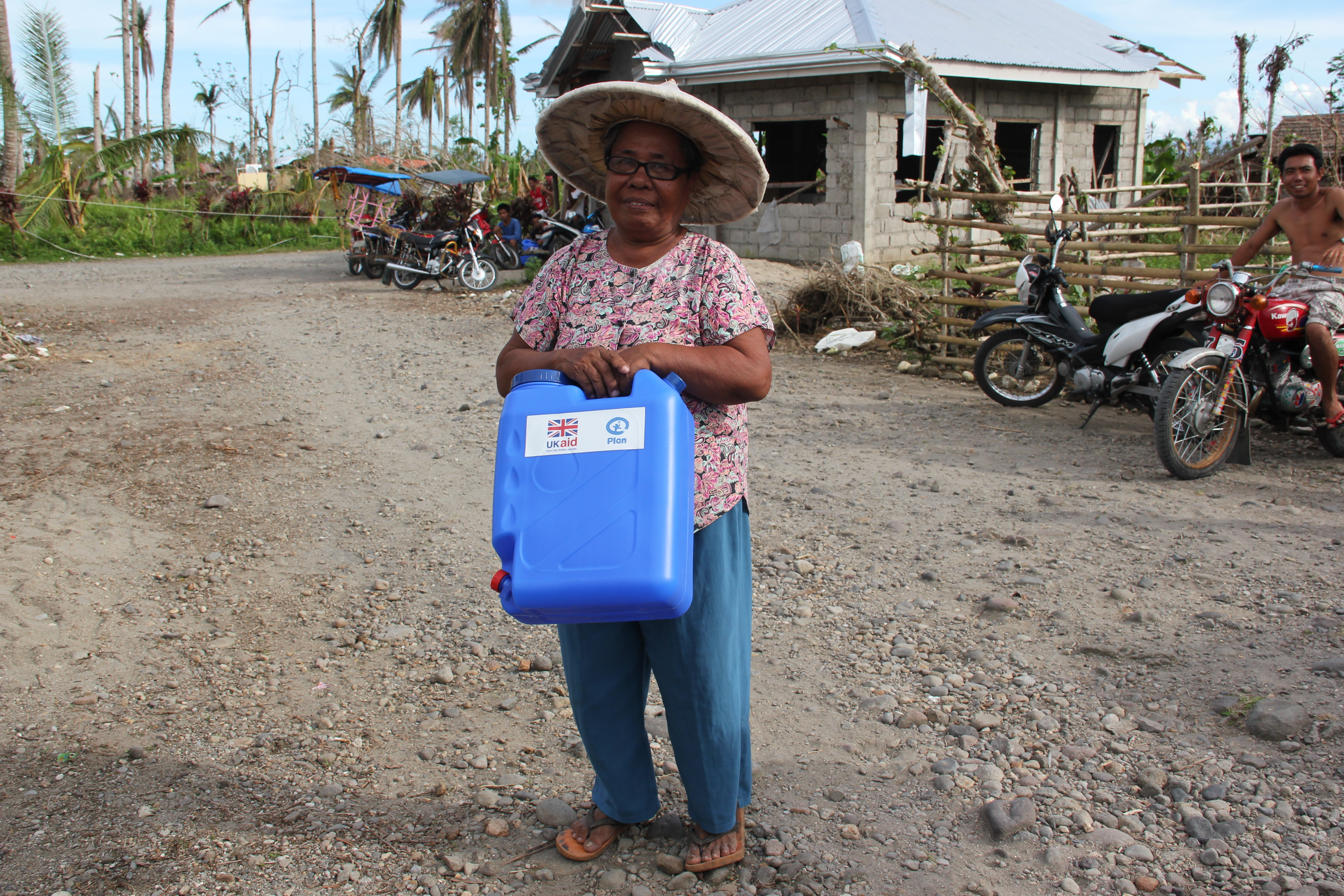
Jerrycans are used to store clean drinking water in the Philippines

There are three main barriers to improvement of urban services in slum areas: Firstly, insufficient supply, especially of networked services. Secondly, there are usually demand constraints that limit people's access to these services (for example due to low willingness to pay). Thirdly, there are institutional constraints that prevent the poor from accessing adequate urban services.

=== Polluted water sources ===
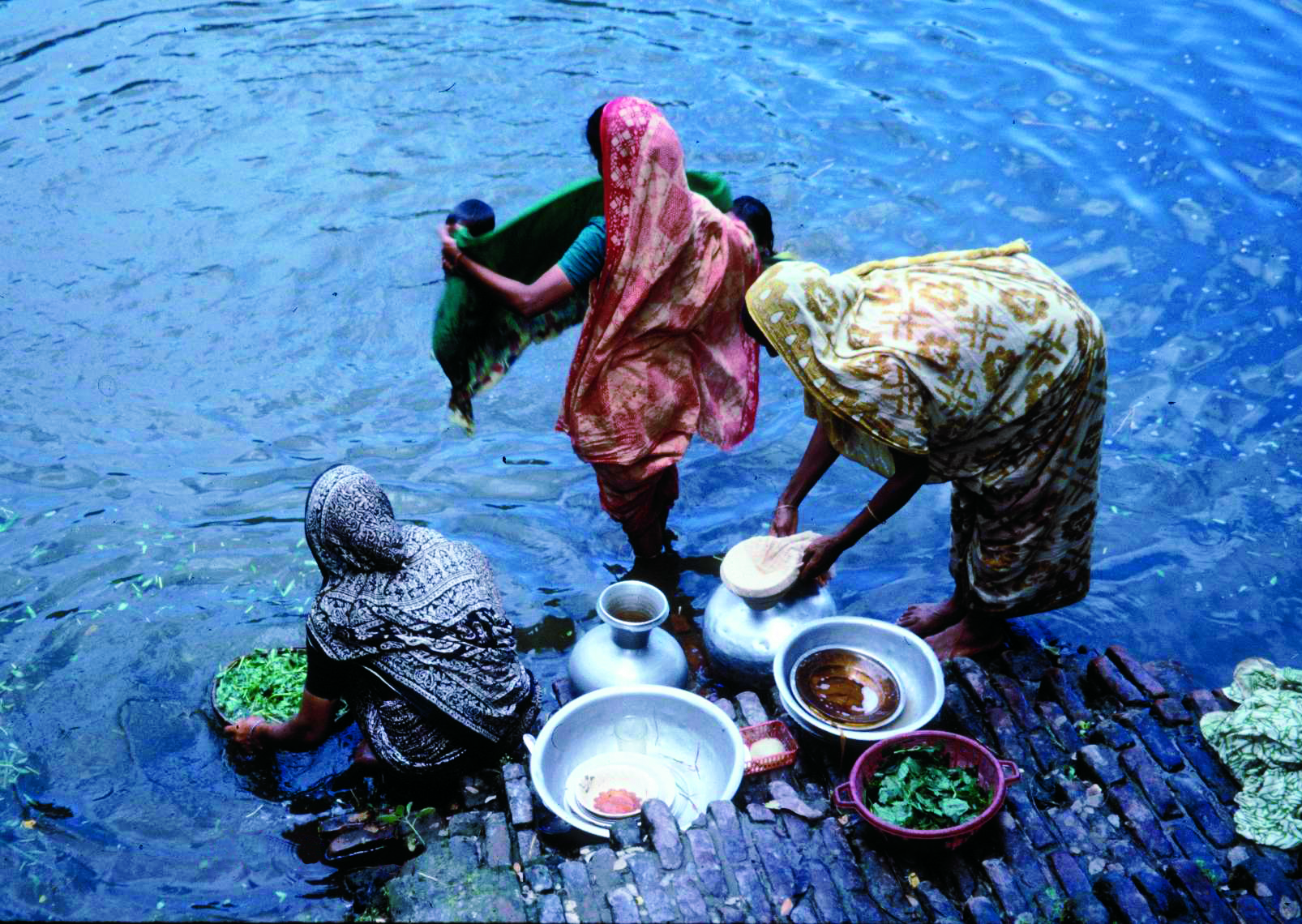
Women at a Village Pond in Matlab, Bangladesh: The woman on the right is putting a sari filter onto a water-collecting pot (or kalash) to filter water for drinking.

Water supply sources include surface water and groundwater. These important water resources are often at risk of being polluted or overused.

Water pollution (or aquatic pollution) is the contamination of water bodies, which has a negative impact on how they can be used. It is usually caused by human activities. Water bodies include lakes, rivers, oceans, aquifers, reservoirs and groundwater. Water pollution results when contaminants mix with these water bodies. Contaminants can come from one of four main sources. These are sewage discharges, industrial activities, agricultural activities, and urban runoff including stormwater. Water pollution may affect either surface water or groundwater. This form of pollution can lead to many problems. One is the degradation of aquatic ecosystems. Another is spreading water-borne diseases when people use polluted water for drinking or irrigation. Water pollution also reduces the ecosystem services such as drinking water provided by the water resource.

Groundwater pollution (also called groundwater contamination) occurs when pollutants are released to the ground and make their way into groundwater. This type of water pollution can also occur naturally due to the presence of a minor and unwanted constituent, contaminant, or impurity in the groundwater, in which case it is more likely referred to as contamination rather than pollution. Groundwater pollution can occur from on-site sanitation systems, landfill leachate, effluent from wastewater treatment plants, leaking sewers, petrol filling stations, hydraulic fracturing (fracking), or from over application of fertilizers in agriculture. Pollution (or contamination) can also occur from naturally occurring contaminants, such as arsenic or fluoride. Using polluted groundwater causes hazards to public health through poisoning or the spread of disease (water-borne diseases).

=== Failures of WASH systems over time ===
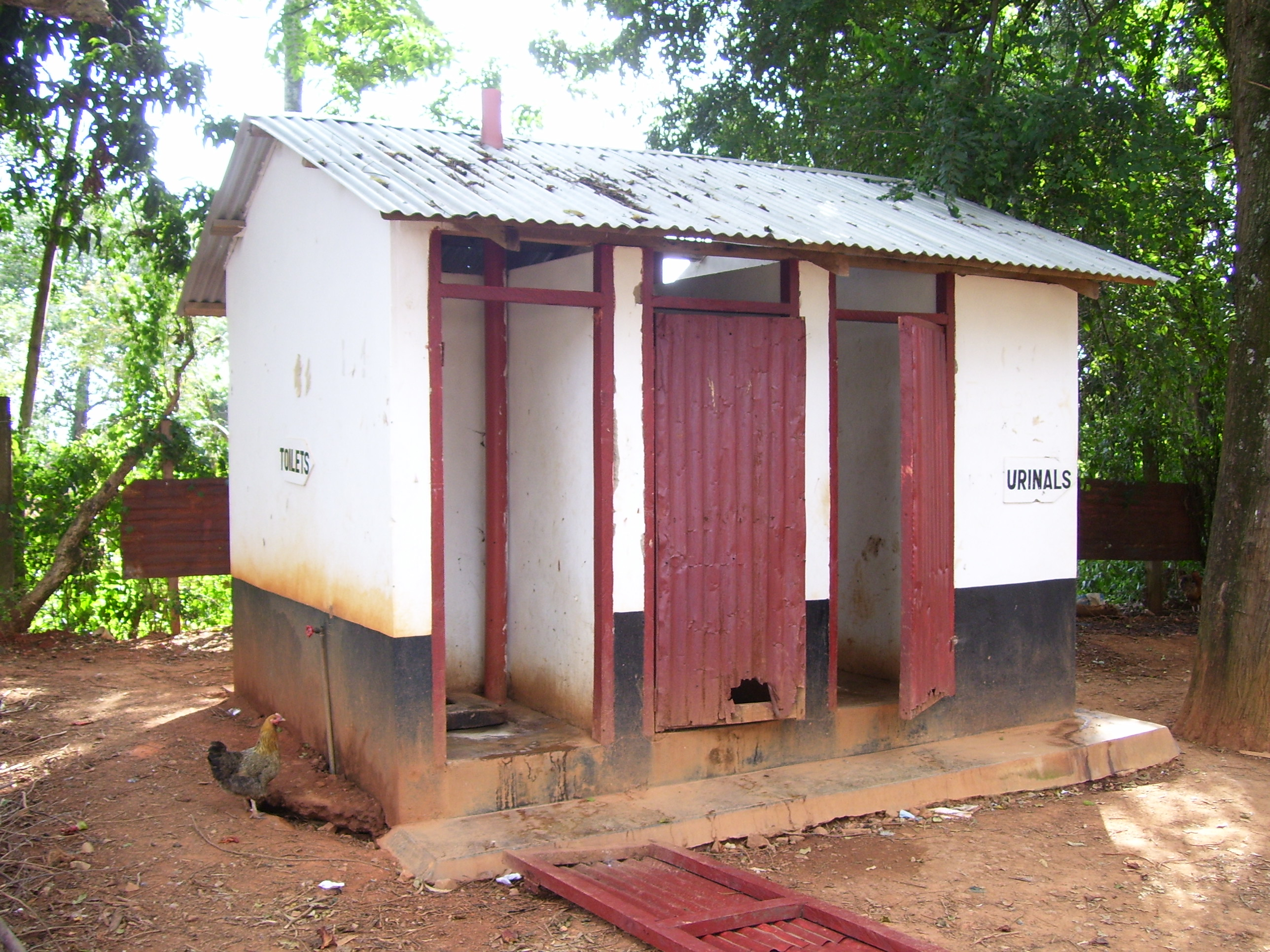
Poorly maintained pit latrine at a school in Nyanza Province, Kenya

The failures of water supply system (such as water points, wells and boreholes) and sanitation systems have been well documented. This has been attributed to financial costs, inadequate technical training for operations and maintenance, poor use of new facilities and taught behaviors, and a lack of community participation and ownership. The poorest populations often cannot afford fees required for operation and maintenance of WASH infrastructure, preventing them from benefitting even when systems do exist.

Contamination of water in distribution systems is a challenge and can contribute to the spread of waterborne diseases.

=== Working conditions of sanitation workers ===
Sanitation workers carrying out manual pit emptying (in Durban, South Africa) with personal protective equipment

A sanitation worker (or sanitary worker) is a person responsible for cleaning, maintaining, operating, or emptying the equipment or technology at any step of the sanitation chain. This is the definition used in the narrower sense within the WASH sector. More broadly speaking, sanitation workers may also be involved in cleaning streets, parks, public spaces, sewers, stormwater drains, and public toilets. Another definition is: "The moment an individual's waste is outsourced to another, it becomes sanitation work." Some organizations use the term specifically for municipal solid waste collectors, whereas others exclude the workers involved in management of solid waste (rubbish, trash) sector from its definition.

Sanitation workers are essential in maintaining safe sanitation services in homes, schools, hospitals, and other settings and protecting public health but face many health risks in doing so, including from exposure to a wide range of biological and chemical agents. Additionally, they may be at risk of injury from heavy labor, poor and prolonged postures and positions and confined spaces, as well as psychosocial stress. These risks are exacerbated under conditions of poverty, illness, poor nutrition, poor housing, child labor, migration, drug and alcohol abuse, discrimination, social stigma and societal neglect. In many developing countries, sanitation workers are "more vulnerable due to unregulated or unenforced environmental and labor protections, and lack of occupational health and safety".

== Climate change aspects ==
=== Greenhouse gas emissions ===
Water and sanitation services contribute to greenhouse gas emissions. These emissions are grouped into three scopes in the international greenhouse gas protocol: direct emissions, as well as two types of indirect emissions (see below).

==== Direct emissions (Scope 1) ====
Scope 1 includes "direct emissions resulting directly from the activity". In the WASH sector, this is methane and nitrous oxide emissions during wastewater and sewage sludge treatment. Sanitation services produce about 2–6% of global human-caused methane emissions. Septic tanks, pit latrines, anaerobic lagoons, anaerobic digesters are all anaerobic treatment processes that emit methane which may or may not be captured (in the case of septic tanks it is usually not captured).

It has been estimated, using data from 2012 and 2013, that "wastewater treatment in centralized facilities contributes alone some 3% of global nitrous oxide emissions and 7% of anthropogenic methane emissions". Data from 2023 from centralized sewage treatment plants in the United States indicate that methane emissions are about twice the estimates provided by IPCC in 2019, i.e. 10.9 ± 7.0 compared to 4.3-6.1 MMT (million metric tons) CO_{2}-eq/yr.

Current methods for estimating sanitation emissions underestimate the significance of methane emissions from non-sewered sanitation systems (NSSS). This is despite the fact that such sanitation systems are prevalent in many countries. NSSS play a vital role in the safe management of fecal sludge and account for approximately half of all existing sanitation provisions. The global methane emissions from NSSS in 2020 was estimated to be 377 Mt CO2e/year or 4.7% of global anthropogenic methane emissions. This is comparable to the greenhouse gas emissions from conventional wastewater treatment plants. Therefore, the GHG emissions from the non-sewered sanitation systems are a non-negligible source. India and China contribute extensively to methane emissions of NSSS because of their large populations and NSSS utilization.

==== Indirect emissions associated with the energy required (Scope 2) ====
Scope 2 includes "indirect emissions associated with the energy required by the activity". Companies that deal with water and wastewater services need energy for various processes. They use the energy mix that is available in the country. The higher the proportion of fossil fuels in the energy mix is, the higher the GHG emissions under Scope 2 will be high too. The processes that need energy include: water abstraction (e.g. groundwater pumping), drinking water storage, water conveyance, water treatment, water distribution, treatment of wastewater, water end use (e.g. water heating), desalination and wastewater reuse. For example, electrical energy is needed for pumping of sewage and for mechanical aeration in activated sludge treatment plants.

When looking at the emissions from the sanitation and wastewater sector most people focus on treatment systems, particularly treatment plants. This is because treatment plants require considerable energy input and are estimated to account for 3% of global electricity consumption. This makes sense for high-income countries, where wastewater treatment is the biggest energy consumer compared to other activities of the water sector. The aeration processes that are used in many secondary treatment processes are particularly energy intensive (using about 50% of the total energy required for treatment). The amount of energy needed to treat wastewater depends on several factors: wastewater quantity and quality (i.e. how much and how polluted is it), treatment level required which in turn influences the type of treatment process that gets selected. The energy efficiency of the treatment process is another factor.

Energy and electricity usage by water and wastewater services under Scope 2 of the carbon accounting method (Indirect emissions associated with energy)
| Parameter | Value | Additional comments | Source | Year of estimate |
|---|---|---|---|---|
| Total energy used by water sector worldwide | 1400 TWh | | | 2014 |
| Proportion of total energy used as electricity | 60% | Mostly for pumping up groundwater for irrigation. | | 2014 |
| Proportion of total energy used as thermal energy | 40% | | | 2014 |
| Percentage of global electricity consumption used by the water sector | 4% | The energy for the use of water by end users (e.g. heating up water) is not included. | | 2014 |
| Usage breakdown for electricity consumed for water supply | Water extraction: 40% Wastewater treatment: 25% Water distribution: 20% Seawater desalination: 5% | | | 2014 |
| Percentage of global electricity consumption used for wastewater treatment plants | 3% | | | 2020 |

==== Indirect emissions related to the activity but caused by other organizations (Scope 3) ====
Scope 3 includes "indirect emissions related to the activity but caused by other organizations". The indirect emissions under Scope 3 are difficult to assess in a standardized way. They include for example emissions from constructing infrastructure, from the manufacture of chemicals that are needed in the treatment process and from the management of the by-product sewage sludge.

==== Reducing greenhouse gas emissions ====
Solutions exist to reduce the greenhouse gas emissions of water and sanitation services. These solutions into three categories which partly overlap: Firstly "reducing water and energy consumption through lean and efficient approaches"; secondly "embracing circular economy to produce energy and valuable products"; and thirdly by "planning to reduce GHG emissions through strategic decisions". The mentioned lean and efficient approaches include for example finding ways to reduce water loss from water networks and to reduce infiltration of rainwater or groundwater into sewers. Also, incentives can to encourage households and industries to reduce their water consumption and their energy requirements for water heating. There is another method to reduce the energy requirements for the treatment of raw water to make drinking water out of it: protecting the quality of the source water better.

Methods that fall into the category of circular economy include: Reusing water, nutrients and materials; Low-carbon energy production (e.g. solar power) on roofs of utility buildings, recovery of waste heat from wastewater, producing hydro-electricity by installing micro-turbines, producing energy from biosolids and sewage sludge. Strategic decisions around reducing GHG emissions include: awareness raising and education, governance that supports changing practices, providing economic incentive to conserve water and reduce consumption, and finally choosing low-carbon energy and supplies.

=== Negative impacts of climate change ===
The effects of climate change can have negative impacts on existing sanitation services in several ways, for example by damage and loss of services from floods and reduced carrying capacity of waters receiving wastewater. The weather and climate-related aspects (variability, seasonality and extreme weather events) have always had an impact on the delivery of sanitation services. But now, extreme weather events, such as floods and droughts, are generally increasing in frequency and intensity due to climate change in many regions. They affect the operation of water supply, storm drainage and sewerage infrastructure, and wastewater treatment plants.

Changes in the frequency and intensity of climate extremes could compound current challenges as water availability becomes more uncertain, and health risks increase due to contaminated water sources. The effects of climate change can result in a decrease of water availability, an increase of water necessity, damage to WASH facilities, and increased water contamination from pollutants. Due to these impacts, climate change can "exacerbate many WASH-related risks and diseases".

Climate change poses increased risks to WASH systems, particular in Sub-Saharan Africa where access to safely managed basic sanitation is low. In that region, it is the poorly managed WASH systems, for example in informal settlements, which make people more vulnerable to the effects of climate change than people elsewhere.

In terms of the water cycle, climate change can affect the amounts of soil infiltration, deeper percolation, and hence groundwater recharge. Also, rising temperature increases evaporative demand over land, which limits the amount of water to replenish groundwater.

==== Influence of climate change on waterborne diseases ====
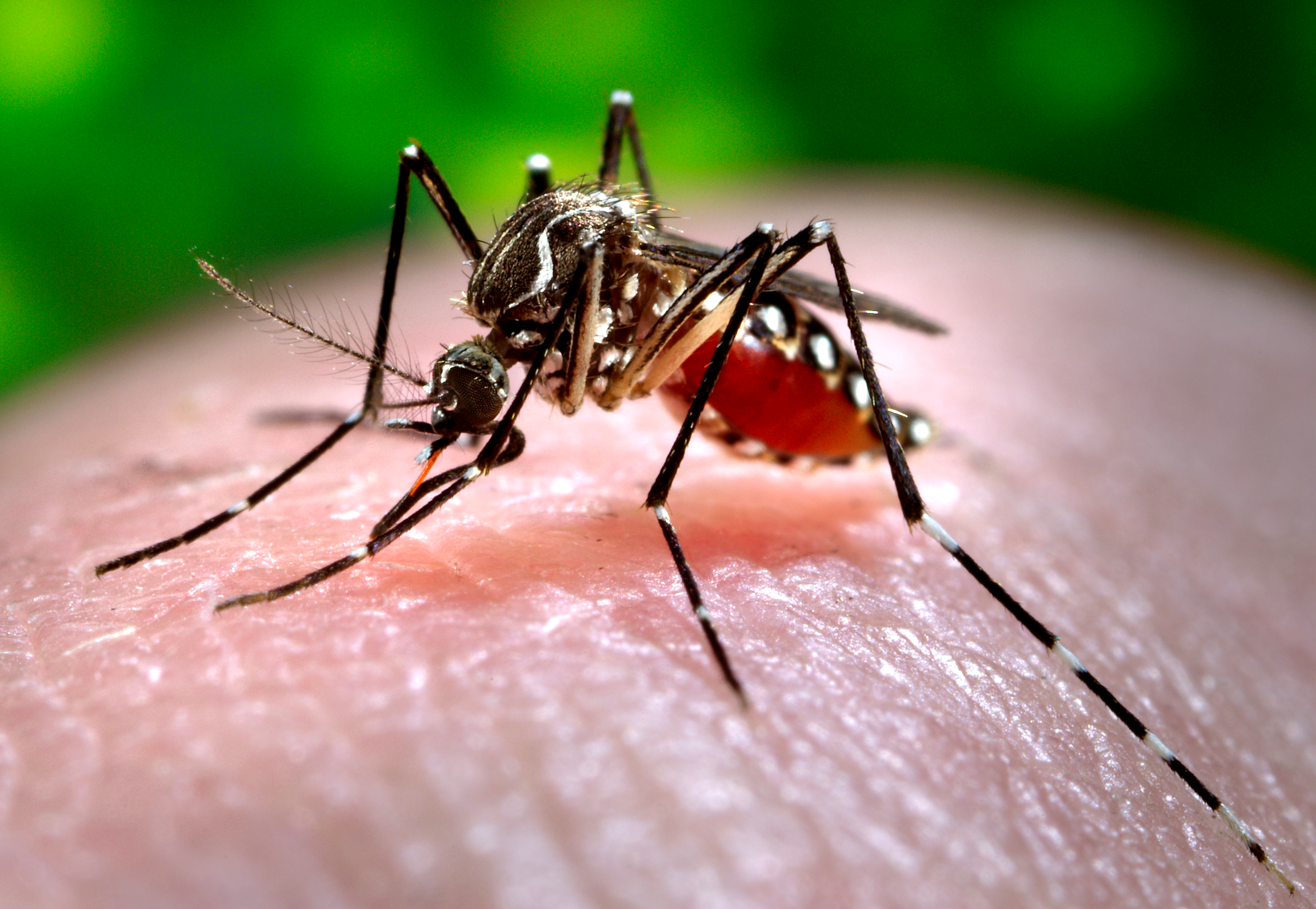
Climate change is altering the geographic range and seasonality of some insects that can carry diseases, for example Aedes aegypti, the mosquito that is the vector for dengue transmission.

Climate change is influencing the transmission and burden of many infectious diseases worldwide. Rising temperatures, shifting rainfall patterns, and more frequent extreme weather events affect how pathogens, vectors and disease hosts interact. These changes are altering the geographic ranges and seasonal activity of disease-carrying organisms such as mosquitoes and ticks, and influence the growth and survival of bacteria and other pathogens in food and water systems.

Infectious diseases that are sensitive to climate can be grouped into: vector-borne diseases (transmitted via mosquitos, ticks etc.), waterborne diseases (transmitted through viruses or bacteria in water), and food-borne diseases (spread through pathogens in food). In 2022 scientists stated a clear observation that "the occurrence of climate-related food-borne and waterborne diseases has increased."

=== Climate change adaptation ===
Adaptation efforts in the WASH sector include for example protection of local water resources (as these resources become source water for drinking water supply) and investigating improvements to the water supply and storage strategy. It might also be necessary to adjust the utility's planning and operation. Climate change adaptation policies need to consider the risks from extreme weather events. The required adaptation measures need to consider measures for droughts and those for floods. Adaptation measures for droughts include for example: reduce leakages in a pro-active manner, communicate restrictions on water use to consumers. Adaptation measures for floods include for example: Review the siting of the water and wastewater treatment plants in floodplains, minimize the impact of floodwater on operational equipment.

Nature-based solutions (NbS) can play an important role for climate change adaptation approaches of water and sanitation services. This includes ecological restoration (which can improve infiltration and thus reduce flooding), ecological engineering for wastewater treatment, green infrastructure for stormwater management, and measures for natural water retention.

Most National Adaptation Plans published by the UN Framework Convention for Climate Change include measures to improve sanitation and hygiene.

Engineers and planners need to adapt design standards for water and sanitation systems to account for the changing climate conditions. Otherwise these infrastructure systems will be more and more vulnerable in future. The same applies for other key infrastructure systems such as transport, energy and communications.

=== Improving climate resilience ===
Climate-resilient water services (or climate-resilient WASH) are services that provide access to high quality drinking water during all seasons and even during extreme weather events. Climate resilience in general is the ability to recover from, or to mitigate vulnerability to, climate-related shocks such as floods and droughts. Climate resilient development has become the new paradigm for sustainable development. This concept thus influences theory and practice across all sectors globally. This is particularly true in the water sector, since water security is closely connected to climate change. On every continent, governments are now adopting policies for climate resilient economies. International frameworks such as the Paris Agreement and the Sustainable Development Goals are drivers for such initiatives.

Several activities can improve water security and increase resilience to climate risks: Carrying out a detailed analysis of climate risk to make climate information relevant to specific users; developing metrics for monitoring climate resilience in water systems (this will help to track progress and guide investments for water security); and using new institutional models that improve water security.

Climate resilient policies can be useful for allocating water, especially when regional water availability may change in future. This requires a good understanding of the current and future hydroclimatic situation. For example, a more accurate prediction of future changes in climate variability leads to a better response to their possible impacts.

To build climate resilience into water systems, people need to have access to climate information that is appropriate for their local context. Climate information products are useful if they cover a wide range of temporal and spatial scales, and provide information on regional water-related climate risks. For example, government staff need easy access to climate information to achieve better water management.

Four important activities to achieve climate resilient WASH services include: First, a risk analysis is performed to look at possible implications of extreme weather events as well as preventive actions. Such preventive actions can include for example elevating the infrastructure to be above expected flood levels. Secondly, managers assess the scope for reducing greenhouse gas emissions and put in place suitable options, e.g. using more renewable energy sources. Thirdly, the water utilities ensure that water sources and sanitation services are reliable at all times during the year, also during times of droughts and floods. Finally, the management and service delivery models are strengthened so that they can withstand a crisis.

To put climate resilience into practice and to engage better with politicians, the following guide questions are useful: "resilience of what, to what, for whom, over what time frame, by whom and at what scale?". For example, "resilience of what?" means thinking beyond infrastructure but to also include resilience of water resources, local institutions and water users. Another example is that "resilience for whom?" speaks about reducing vulnerability and preventing negative developments: Some top-down interventions that work around power and politics may undermine indigenous knowledge and compromise community resilience.

==== Adaptive capacity for climate resilience ====
Adaptive capacity in water management systems can help to absorb some of the impacts of climate-related events and increase climate resilience. Stakeholders at various scales, i.e. from small urban utilities to national governments, need to have access to reliable information which details regional climate and climate change. For example, context-specific climate tools can help national policy makers and sub-national practitioners to make informed decisions to improve climate resilience. A global research program called REACH (led by the University of Oxford and funded by the UK Government's Foreign, Commonwealth & Development Office) is developing and using such climate tools for Kenya, Ethiopia and Bangladesh during 2015 to 2024.

== Approaches for planning and implementation ==
=== National WASH plans and monitoring ===
UN-Water carries out the Global Analysis and Assessment of Sanitation and Drinking-Water (GLAAS) initiative. This work examines the "extent to which countries develop and implement national policies and plans for WASH, conduct regular monitoring, regulate and take corrective action as needed, and coordinate these parallel processes with sufficient financial resources and support from strong national institutions."

Many countries' WASH plans are not supported by the necessary financial and human resources. This hinders their implementation and intended outcomes for WASH service delivery.

As of 2022, it is becoming more common for countries to include "climate change preparedness approaches" in their national WASH plans. Preparedness in this context means working on mitigation, adaptation and resilience of WASH systems. Still, most national policies on WASH services do not set out how to address climate risks and how to increase the resilience of infrastructure and management.

=== Women's empowerment ===
There has been a growing understanding of the role of gender in development in recent decades (often called gender mainstreaming). Women's empowerment plays an important role in reducing gender disparities and related adverse outcomes across all sectors, including the WASH sector. Women's empowerment is particularly crucial in WASH, as prevalent social norms assign the majority of water collection roles to women in many developing countries. Empowerment is largely described in the literature as both a process by which WASH services could be improved as well as the result of improved WASH services.

The Empowerment in WASH Index (EWI) was developed in 2019 to guide WASH practitioners in measuring and monitoring gender outcomes, empowerment, and inclusivity in WASH-related interventions. National indices and tools also exist to capture changes in gender disparities at the national level: Gender Empowerment Measure (GEM), Gender Inequality Index (GII), and Gender Development Index (GDI).

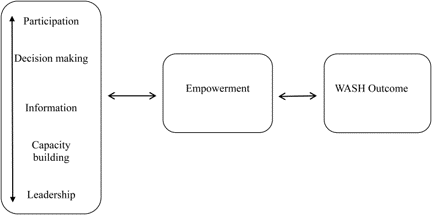
This figure shows an empowerment framework in the WASH sector. WASH outcomes are both a source and an outcome of empowerment. Such outcomes include improved access to safe drinking water and sanitation, reduction in water-related diseases, healthcare savings, adequate time for engaging in economic activities for income, etc.

A scoping review of the literature found five key interrelated dimensions of empowerment in the WASH sector:

1. Access to information (knowledge sharing, awareness creation, and information dissemination),
2. Participation (community engagement, partnerships, and involvement in the design and governance of WASH projects),
3. Capacity building (leveraging of human capital, organizational resources, and social capital to solve collective problem)
4. Leadership and accountability, and
5. Decision-making and inclusiveness.

A qualitative study in Asutifi North District in Ghana conceptualized empowerment in terms of four major themes: availability of resources, WASH information, social and cultural structures, and agency (the ability to define and act on individual or shared goals, and to put them into effect).

The Dublin Statement on Water and Sustainable Development in 1992 included "Women Play a central part in the provision management and safeguarding of water" as one of four principles. In 1996, the World Bank Group published a Toolkit on Gender in Water and Sanitation. Gender-sensitive approaches to water and sanitation have proven to be cost effective.

== History ==
The history of water supply and sanitation is the topic of a separate article.

The abbreviation WASH was used from the year 1988 onwards as an acronym for the Water and Sanitation for Health Project of the United States Agency for International Development. At that time, the letter "H" stood for health, not hygiene. Similarly, in Zambia the term WASHE was used in a report in 1987 and stood for Water Sanitation Health Education. An even older USAID WASH project report dates back to as early as 1981.

From about 2001 onwards, international organizations active in the area of water supply and sanitation advocacy, such as the Water Supply and Sanitation Collaborative Council and the International Water and Sanitation Centre (IRC) in the Netherlands began to use WASH as an umbrella term for water, sanitation and hygiene. WASH has since then been broadly adopted as a handy acronym for water, sanitation and hygiene in the international development context. The term WatSan was also used for a while, especially in the emergency response sector such as with IFRC and UNHCR, but has not proven as popular as WASH.

== Society and culture ==
=== Global goals ===
World map for Indicator 6.2.1a in 2022: Share of population using safely managed sanitation facilities

Since 1990, the Joint Monitoring Program for Water Supply and Sanitation (JMP) of WHO and UNICEF has regularly produced estimates of global WASH progress. The JMP was already responsible for monitoring the UN's Millennium Development Goal (MDG) Target 7.C, which aimed to "halve, by 2015, the proportion of the population without sustainable access to safe drinking water and basic sanitation". This has been replaced in 2015 by the Sustainable Development Goal 6 (SDG 6), which is to "ensure availability and sustainable management of water and sanitation for all" by 2030. To establish a reference point from which progress toward achieving the SDGs could be monitored, the JMP produced "Progress on Drinking Water, Sanitation and Hygiene: 2017 Update and SDG Baselines".

Expanding WASH coverage and monitoring in non-household settings such as schools, healthcare facilities, and work places, is included in Sustainable Development Goal 6.

WaterAid International is a non-governmental organization (NGO) that works on improving the availability of safe drinking water in some the world's poorest countries.

Sanitation and Water for All is a partnership that brings together national governments, donors, UN agencies, NGOs and other development partners. They work to improve sustainable access to sanitation and water supply. In 2014, 77 countries had already met the MDG sanitation target, 29 were on track and, 79 were not on-track.

=== Awards ===
Important awards for individuals or organizations working on WASH include the Stockholm Water Prize since 1991 and the Sarphati Sanitation Awards since 2013, for sanitation entrepreneurship.

=== United Nations organs ===
- UNICEF - UNICEF's declared strategy is "to achieve universal and equitable access to safe and affordable drinking water for all". UNICEF includes WASH initiatives in their work with schools in over 30 countries.
- UN-Water - an interagency mechanism which "coordinates the efforts of UN entities and international organizations working on water and sanitation issues".

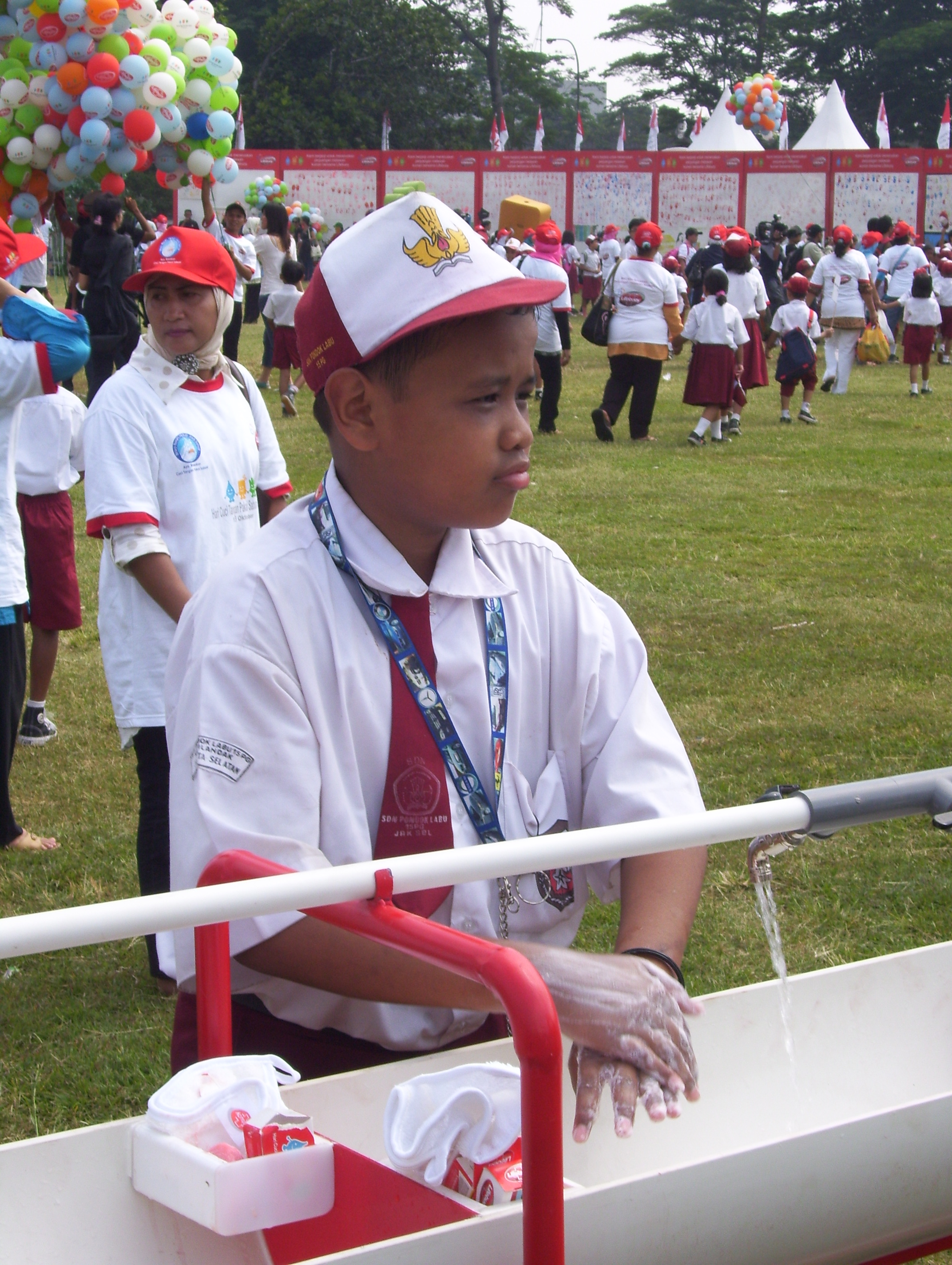
Global Handwashing Day celebrations in Indonesia

=== Awareness raising through observance days ===
The United Nations' International Year of Sanitation in 2008 helped to increase attention for funding of sanitation in WASH programs of many donors. For example, the Bill and Melinda Gates Foundation has increased their funding for sanitation projects since 2009, with a strong focus on reuse of excreta.

Awareness raising for the importance of WASH takes place through several United Nations international observance days, namely World Water Day, Menstrual Hygiene Day, World Toilet Day and Global Handwashing Day.

== See also ==
- Global Water Security & Sanitation Partnership
- Human right to water and sanitation
- Water issues in developing countries
- Water Supply and Sanitation Collaborative Council
- Water supply and sanitation in sub-Saharan Africa
- Rural Water Supply Network
- Sustainable Sanitation Alliance
- World Toilet Organization (WTO)
