= London Declaration on Neglected Tropical Diseases =

Global disease eradication programme

The London Declaration on Neglected Tropical Diseases was a collaborative disease eradication programme launched on 30 January 2012 in London. It was inspired by the World Health Organization roadmap to eradicate or prevent transmission for neglected tropical diseases by the year 2020. Officials from WHO, the World Bank, the Bill & Melinda Gates Foundation, the world's 13 leading pharmaceutical companies, and government representatives from US, UK, United Arab Emirates, Bangladesh, Brazil, Mozambique and Tanzania participated in a joint meeting at the Royal College of Physicians to launch this project. The meeting was spearheaded by Margaret Chan, Director-General of WHO, and Bill Gates, Co-Chair of the Bill & Melinda Gates Foundation.

This declaration was the largest coordinated effort to date in health issues and it aimed to eliminate or control 10 neglected diseases by 2020 by providing more than US$785 million to support research and development. These diseases are most rampant in economically deprived regions of the world and affect 1.4 billion people.

== Neglected tropical diseases ==
The rather commitments include:

- eradicating or controlling transmission of Guinea worm disease
- eliminating lymphatic filariasis, leprosy, African sleeping sickness and blinding trachoma
- control of schistosomiasis, soil-transmitted helminthiasis, Chagas disease, visceral leishmaniasis, and river blindness by 2020.

== Endorsements ==
=== Initial partners ===
The original endorsers with their basic strategies were:

==== Government and international organizations ====
1. USAID: The US federal government agency will continue support to over 20 countries with its $89 million appropriation from Congress.
2. World Bank: The international financial institution will implement the African Programme for Onchocerciasis Control to completely control river blindness.

==== Foundations and charitable organisations ====
1. Bill & Melinda Gates Foundation: The foundation has put up a 5-year US$363 million commitment, the largest funding for the project.
2. The Children's Investment Fund Foundation: A UK charitable organisation.
3. Becton Dickinson: An American medical technology company.
4. Bristol-Myers Squibb: A New York-based pharmaceutical company.
5. Drugs for Neglected Diseases Initiative (DNDi): A global research and development organisation with headquarters at Geneva will actively work for development of new drugs (such as oxaborole, fexinidazole) and perform clinical trials.
6. Lions Clubs International: A secular service club in Illinois supports blindness prevention through its SightFirst programme to fight blinding trachoma. The SightFirst has allocated over US$11 million in 10 countries for eye surgeries, medical training, distribution of Zithromax and tetracycline, and sanitary services. It has also announced US$6.9 million funding to support the Government of China.
7. Mundo Sano: An international non-profit organization based in Argentina to fight against Chagas disease and soil-transmitted helminths. It contributed US$5 million for project expansion and program enhancement for selected sites in the Americas and Africa.

==== Pharmaceutical companies ====
1. Abbott: The US-based global pharmaceutical and health care company works for the prevention, diagnosis and treatment of all major neglected diseases. It provides innovative technologies, drug compounds and scientific expertise, academic research and health education.
2. AstraZeneca: The British-Swedish multinational pharmaceutical and biologics company headquartered in London.
3. Bayer HealthCare Pharmaceuticals: The division of Germany's pharmaceutical company supports the fight against Chagas disease and African sleeping sickness. The company will specifically make their products nifurtimox and suramin, the drugs of choice for the disease respectively, doubly accessible in South America and Africa, where the diseases are prevalent.
4. Eisai: The Japanese pharmaceutical company with headquarters at Tokyo will manufacture and supply Diethylcarbamazine (up to 2.2 billion 100 mg tablets) free of charge to WHO to combat lymphatic filariasis.
5. Gilead Sciences: The biopharmaceutical company in California that discovers, develops and commercializes therapeutics will donate 445,000 vials of its AmBisome over five years (equivalent to $8 million) for treatment of visceral leishmaniasis.
6. GlaxoSmithKline: The London-based multinational pharmaceutical and consumer healthcare company headquartered will donate 400 million albendazole tablets each year to fight soil-transmitted helminthiasis. Further it will continue to provide 600 million tablets albendazole per year for lymphatic filariasis as long as necessary until the disease is eliminated.
7. Johnson & Johnson: The American multinational medical and consumer packaged goods manufacturer will work through its collaborative project Children Without Worms in the dissemination of drugs and providing health education. It will extend its existing donation of mebendazole (200 million tablets per year) for soil-transmitted helminthiasis.
8. Merck KGaA: The German chemical and pharmaceutical company will continue to donate praziquantel for schistosomiasis indefinitely. It will increase its annual donation from 25 million tablets at present to 250 million tablets (worth US$23 million per year).
9. Merck Sharp & Dohme, MSD: An American pharmaceutical company will run Mectizan Donation Program to provide ivermectin for river blindness and lymphatic filariasis.
10. Novartis: a Swiss multinational pharmaceutical company based in Basel will extend its commitment to provide multi-drug therapy (rifampicin, clofazimine and dapsone) to eradicate leprosy.
11. Pfizer: A New York-based American multinational pharmaceutical corporation will continue its donation of azithromycin for blinding trachoma until at least 2020.
12. Sanofi: A French multinational pharmaceutical company headquartered in Paris will extend its existing donation of eflornithine, melarsoprol and pentamidine for treating sleeping sickness.

=== Other endorsers ===
There were 71 endorsing organisations, including NGOs, academic institutes and companies. As the programme was launched, the governments of Brazil, Tanzania, Bangladesh and Mozambique announced political and financial commitment to the implementation of the programme.

== Progress and achievements ==
The annual progress reports on the London Declaration are reported by the organisation, Uniting to Combat Neglected Tropical Diseases. These reports celebrated progress and identified the issues in achieving the aims of the declaration. In 2017, the Uniting to Combat NTDs received the Guinness World Record of "Most medication donated in 24 hours (multiple venues)" for donating 207,169,292 doses of drugs within 24 hours.

The programme did not meet complete success, but millions of lives were saved, the burden of the infections was reduced, and 42 countries eliminated at least one disease. An estimated 500 million people became free from treatments against one or more diseases. One of the biggest successes was the control of Guinea worm disease; by 2018, it was eliminated in 19 of 21 countries. As the London Declaration programme ended, only 15 cases were recorded globally. Lymphatic filariasis was eliminated as public health problems in 16 countries, trachoma in 10 countries, and onchocerciasis in four. Annual cases of African trypanosomiasis were reduced from more than 7000 in 2012 to fewer than 1000 in 2018; the number surpassed the projected 2000 cases by 2020. Cases of leprosy has been reduced to 1% in a year.

In 2019, the Government of the United Arab Emirates announced that it will observe 30 January as the World NTD Day. The next year, WHO formally adopted the day to commemorate the launch of both the first NTD road map and the London Declaration.

== See also ==
- Sanitation
- Helminthiasis
- Kigali Declaration on Neglected Tropical Diseases
