= Soil-transmitted helminthiasis =

Roundworm infection contracted from contaminated soil

- Other names: STH
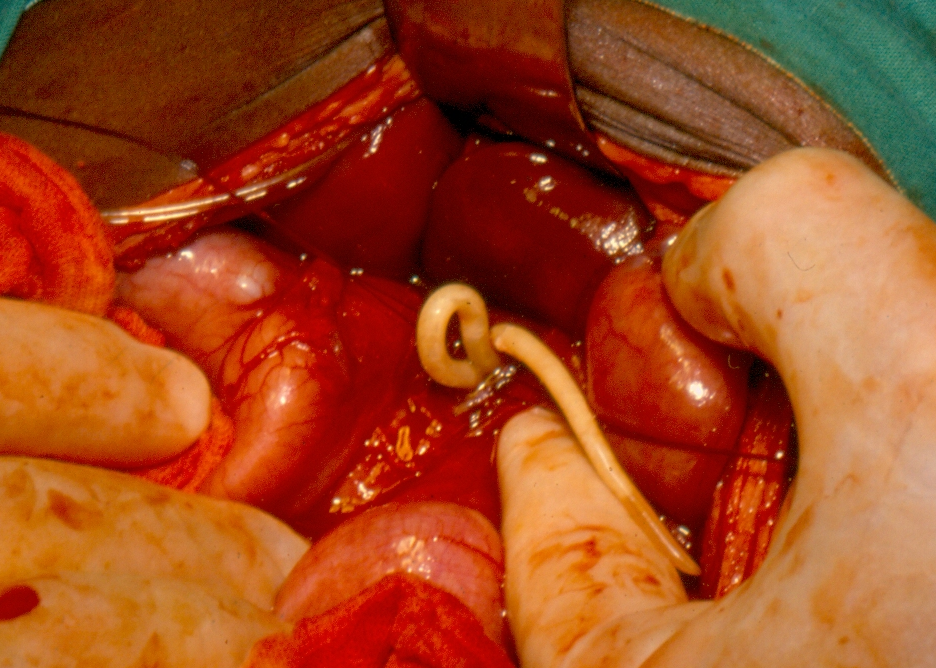
- Adult ascaris worms being removed from the bile duct of a patient in South Africa

Although periodic deworming reduces intestinal worm burden, reinfection can occur when people remain exposed to contaminated environments. A systematic review and meta-analysis found that access to improved water, sanitation and hygiene was associated with lower odds of soil-transmitted helminth infection, which support the importance of environmental and behavioural interventions alongside anthelmintic treatment.

Soil-transmitted helminthiasis is a type of worm infection (helminthiasis) caused by different species of roundworms. It is caused specifically by worms transmitted through soil contaminated with fecal matter and are known as soil-transmitted helminths. Three types of soil-transmitted helminthiasis can be distinguished: ascariasis, hookworm infection and whipworm infection. These three types of infection are caused by the large roundworm A. lumbricoides, the hookworms Necator americanus or Ancylostoma duodenale and by the whipworm Trichuris trichiura.

It has become the most common parasitic disease of humans worldwide. Approximately two billion people (about a fourth of global population) are infected as of the latest estimate, and four billion at risk, surpassing even the all-time most prevalent parasitic disease, malaria. The largest numbers of cases occur in impoverished rural areas of Sub-Saharan Africa, Latin America, Southeast Asia, and China. Its main cause, like for many types of helminth infections, is lack of sanitation, such as the practice of open defecation, lack of hygiene such as hand washing and walking barefoot on contaminated soil. It is regarded as one of the world's most important causes of intellectual and physical disability.

The helminthic disease is so named because the infection is transmitted through ingestion of the nematode eggs in the soil, which is contaminated through feces. Therefore, the disease is most prevalent in warm and moist climates where sanitation and hygiene are poor and waters are unsafe, including the temperate zones during warmer months. STH is categorised among neglected tropical diseases because it inflicts tremendous disability and suffering, which can be clinically treated and relatively easily prevented (primarily through improved sanitation), yet negligible attention has been given for many years. It is now among the target diseases of London Declaration on Neglected Tropical Diseases (launched on 30 January 2012) to be controlled/eradicated by 2020.

Simple prevention and control strategies are access to improved sanitation, public awareness of personal hygiene, and health education.

== Types ==
Soil-transmitted helminths are intestinal parasites and their eggs which are liberated into soil along with the feces of infected persons. Ascaris and hookworm eggs become infective as they develop into larvae in soil. Infection occurs when vegetables and fruits contaminated with egg-infested soil are consumed, or when contaminated hands or fingers are placed in the mouth. Hookworm eggs are not directly infective. They hatch in soil, releasing mobile larvae that can penetrate the skin. Thus infection is acquired through accidental contact with contaminated soil.

=== Ascariasis ===
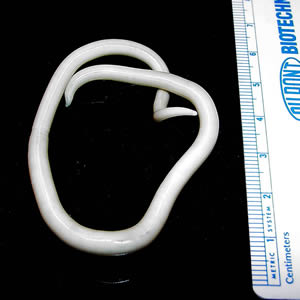
Female Ascaris lumbricoides

Ascariasis of STH is caused by the large roundworm A. lumbricoides. It is estimated to be the most widespread STH, affecting approximately 1 billion people. The victims constitute about half of the populations in tropical and subtropical areas. Most conditions are mild and often show little or no symptoms. Heavy infections however are debilitating, causing severe intestinal blockage and impairing growth in children. Children, compounded with malnutrition, are most infected, with the most common age group being 3- to 8-year-olds, with an annual death of about 20,000. Children are more susceptible due to their frequent exposure to contaminated environments such as during playing, eating raw vegetables and fruits, and drinking wastewater.

=== Hookworm disease ===
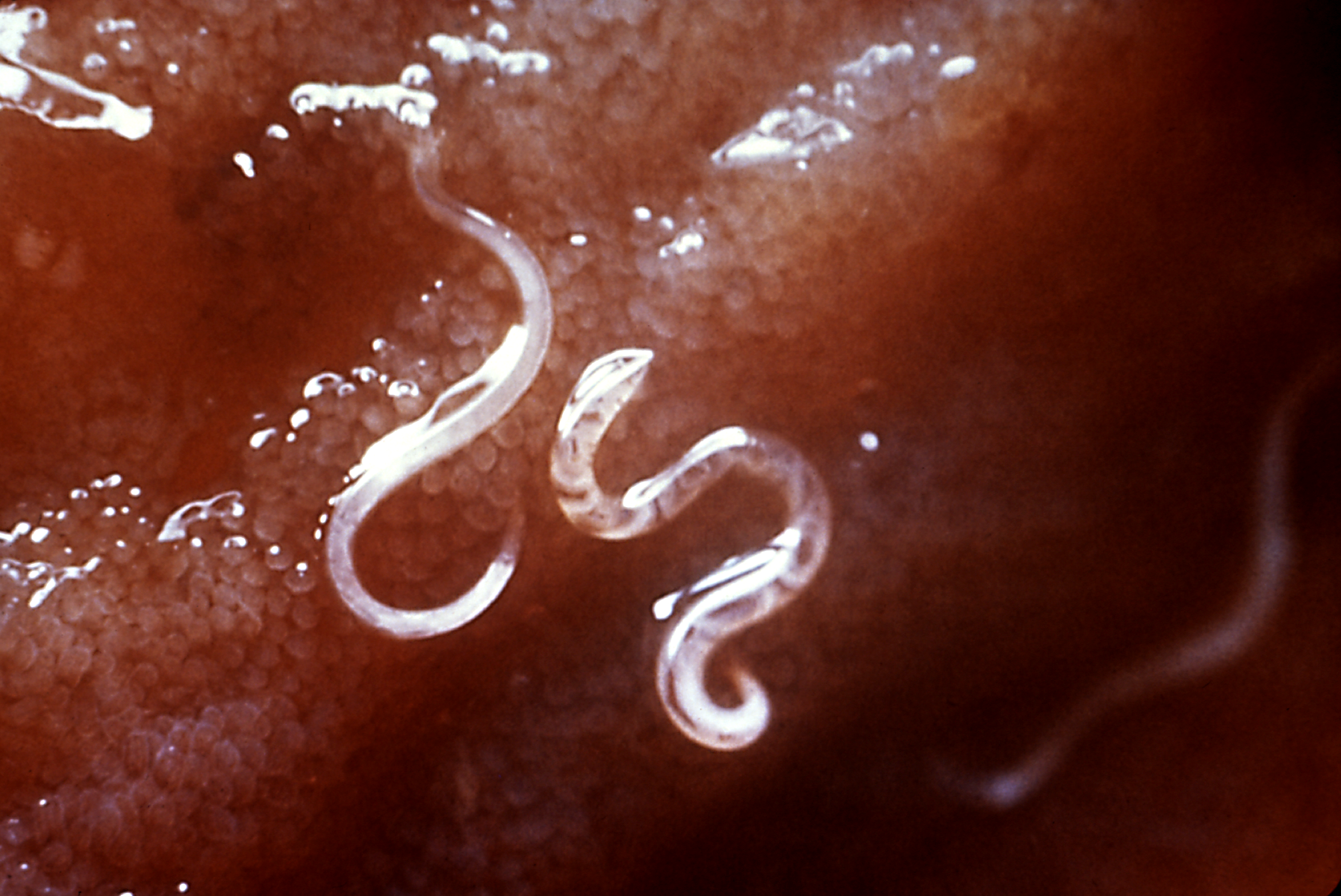
Hookworm

Hookworm infection of STH is caused by N. americanus and A. duodenale. Mild infections produce diarrhoea and abdominal pain. More severe infections can create serious health problems for newborns, children, pregnant women, and malnourished adults. It is the leading cause of anaemia and protein deficiency in developing nations, affecting an estimated 740 million people. N. americanus is the more common hookworm, while A. duodenale is more geographically restricted. Unlike other STHs, in which school-age children are most affected, high-intensity hookworm infections are more frequent in adults, specifically women. Roughly 44 million pregnant women are estimated to be infected. The disease causes severe adverse effects in both the mother and infant, such as low birth weight, impaired milk production, and increased risk of mortality.

=== Trichuriasis ===
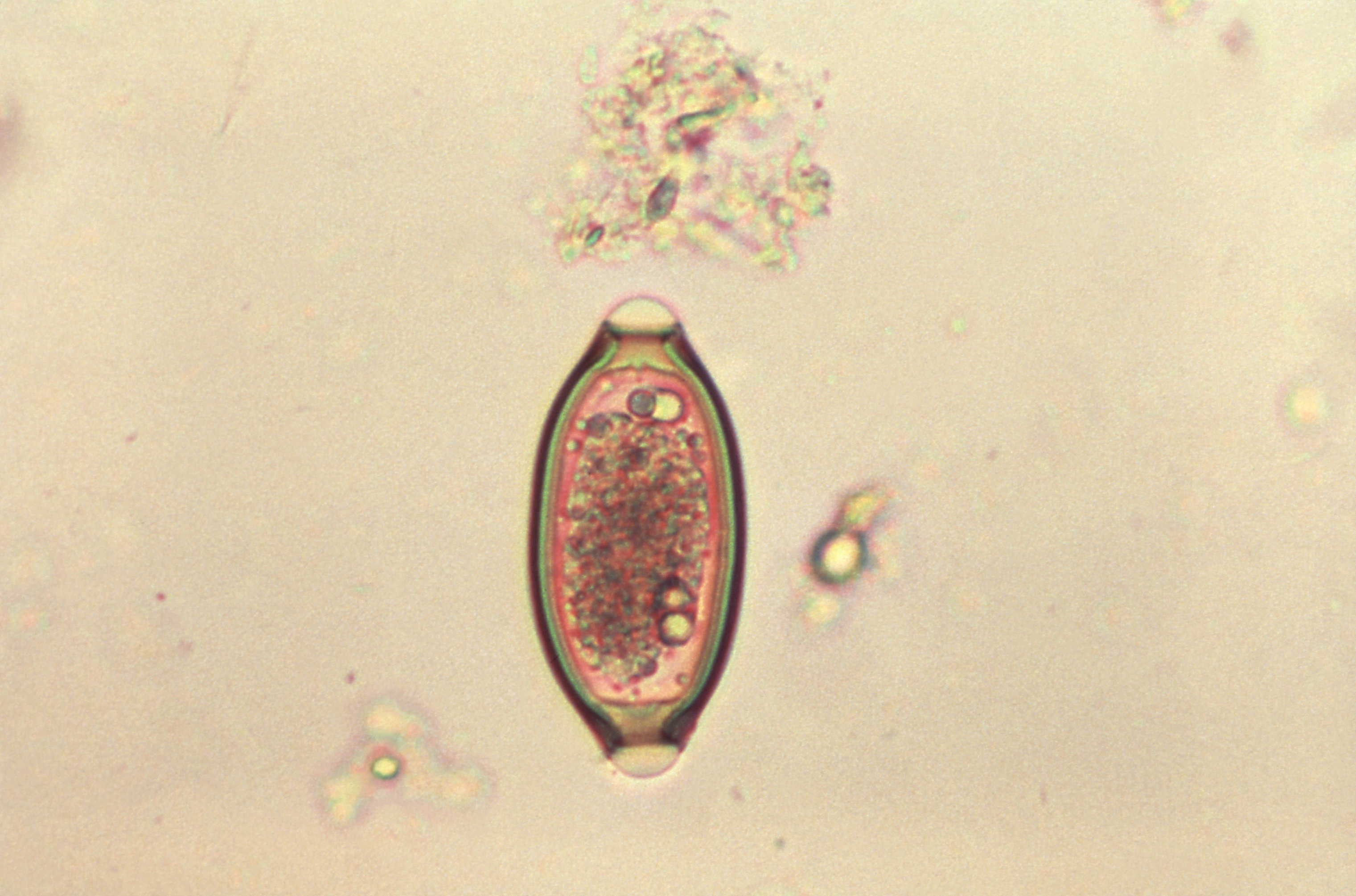
Trichuris trichiura egg

Whipworm (Trichuris trichiura) is the third most common STH-causing nematode in humans. According to current estimates, nearly 800 million people are infected, the majority of them children. Heavy infections could lead to acute symptoms such as diarrhoea and anaemia, and chronic symptoms such as growth retardation and impaired cognitive development. Medical conditions are more often serious since coinfection with protozoan parasites such as Giardia and Entamoeba histolytica, and with other nematodes is common. Predominantly a tropical disease of developing countries, trichuriasis is quite common in the United States.

== Signs and symptoms ==
Symptoms become evident only when the intensity of infection is relatively high. Thus the degree of negative outcomes is directly related to worm burden; more worms means greater severity of disease.

=== General ===
Most conditions of STH have a light worm burden and usually have no discernible symptoms. Heavy infections however cause a range of health problems, including abdominal pain, diarrhoea, blood and protein loss, rectal prolapse, and physical and intellectual disability. Severe ascariasis is typically a pneumonia, as the larvae invade lungs, producing fever, cough and dyspnoea during early stage of infection. Hookworm infections insinuate a skin reaction (dermatitis), increased white blood cells (eosinophils), a pulmonary reaction (pneumonitis), and skin rash (urticarial).

Iron deficiency anaemia due to blood loss is a common symptom.

=== Malnutrition ===
STH is often associated with malnutrition in children as it worsens their nutritional status in multiple ways. The worms can induce intestinal bleeding, competition for nutrients (malabsorption of nutrients), frequent anaemia and diarrhoea. Soil-transmitted helminths can also cause loss of appetite. These nutritional "knock on" effects of STH can have a significant impact on the mental and physical development of children. In endemic countries, communities remain suppressed due to malnourishment, intellectual disability, and physical weaknesses as a result of heavy infections.

== Diagnosis ==
For basic diagnosis, specific helminths can be generally identified from the feces, and their eggs are microscopically examined and enumerated using fecal egg count method. However, there are certain limitations such as the inability to identify mixed infections, and on clinical practice, the technique is inaccurate and unreliable. A novel effective method for egg analysis is the Kato–Katz technique. It is a highly accurate and rapid method for A. lumbricoides and T. trichiura; however not so much for hookworm, which could be due to fast degeneration of the rather delicate hookworm eggs.

== Prevention ==
Prevention and control measures to prevent soil-transmitted helminthiasis are the following: availability of clean water for personal and domestic uses, improved access to sanitation which includes the use of properly functioning and clean toilets by all community members, education on personal hygiene such as hand washing and hygienic and safe food preparation; eliminating the use of untreated human feces as fertilizer.

== Treatment ==
The World Health Organizations recommended albendazole or mebendazole for treatment.

=== Periodical mass administration of anthelmintics ===
One strategy to control the disease in areas where it is highly endemic is the treatment of entire groups of people regardless of symptoms via large scale, periodical mass drug administration. This approach, known as mass deworming utilizes "community diagnosis" (a survey is conducted on a population sample to decide about the need of intervention) instead of "individual diagnosis," which would be much more expensive than the treatment itself. Mass deworming allows for the treatment of large number of infected individuals at a very low cost; however, many uninfected individuals are also receiving drugs. Fortunately, this poses no risk to them since the deworming medicines are extremely safe. Some researchers argue that mass deworming, in the absence of a positive test, does not improve nutrition, hemoglobin levels, school attendance, or academic performance. However, these results are derived from measuring mean improvements in the population receiving the intervention, which includes both infected and uninfected individuals. Obviously, no improvement should be expected in non-infected individuals that are treated only for logistic reasons. When health improvements are measured specifically in infected children, who are the targets of the intervention, the results indicate significant health benefits. The World Health Organization recommends mass treatments to all at-risk groups in endemic communities, especially women of childbearing age, and children. Mass treatments can also be provided to pregnant women in their second and third trimesters, and breastfeeding women. Every year over 400 million individuals are treated with this approach.

For this purpose, broad-spectrum benzimidazoles such as mebendazole and albendazole are the drugs of choice recommended by WHO. These anthelminthics are safe, inexpensive, and effective for several months. Mebendazole is given twice a day for three consecutive days, while albendazole is given as a single dose. WHO recommends annual treatment in areas where between 20 and 50% of people are infected, and a twice-a-year treatment if it is over 50%; and in low-risk situations (i.e. less than 20% prevalence) case-by-case treatment. In addition to these, pyrantel pamoate is also equally effective on Ascaris. However, it has been reported that albendazole, mebendazole, and pyrantel pamoate are not entirely effective against T. trichiura with single oral doses in population-based control.

=== Drugs for those with other diseases ===
In cases of coinfection, combination therapy with ivermectin and diethylcarbamazine is advocated. However coinfection with malaria and HIV, especially among African women, does not respond well to the current combination therapies. It is more pressing for trichuriasis that the recommended drugs fail to provide positive results. A novel drug tribendimidine, which was approved in China by the CCDC for human use in 2004, has been subjected to clinical trials showing that they are highly effective against major human flukes, ascaris (>90% cure rate) and hookworm (>82%); however with low cure rate for whipworm (<37%).

=== Surgical intervention ===
In some severe cases of ascariasis, the number of Ascaris worms can cause intestinal obstruction requiring emergency surgery. The obstruction may be due to a collected mass of worms or to a twisting of the intestine. During the surgery the worms may be manually removed.

== Epidemiology ==
=== Regions ===
Infections are widely distributed in tropical and subtropical areas, with the greatest numbers occurring in sub-Saharan Africa, the Americas, China, and East Asia.

=== Infection estimates ===
The World Health Organization estimates that globally more than 1.5 billion people (24% of the total population) have a soil-transmitted helminth infection. Over 270 million preschool-age children and over 600 million school-age children live in areas where these parasites are intensively transmitted, and need treatment and preventive interventions. Latest estimates indicate that more than 880 million children need treatment from STH infections.

By type of parasitic worm, the breakdown is:

- approximately 807–1,121 million with ascaris
- approximately 576–740 million with hookworm
- approximately 604–795 million with whipworm

=== Deaths ===
Latest estimates indicate that the total annual death toll which is directly attributable is as high as 135,000. The death toll due to the malnutrition link is likely to be much higher.
