= Soil-transmitted helminth =

Group of intestinal parasites that are transmitted through contaminated soil

The soil-transmitted helminths (also called geohelminths) are a group of intestinal parasites belonging to the phylum Nematoda that are transmitted primarily through contaminated soil. They are so called because they have a direct life cycle which requires no intermediate hosts or vectors, and the parasitic infection occurs through faecal contamination of soil, foodstuffs and water supplies. The adult forms are essentially parasites of humans, causing soil-transmitted helminthiasis (STH), but also infect domesticated mammals. The juveniles are the infective forms and they undergo tissue-migratory stages during which they invade vital organs such as lungs and liver. Thus the disease manifestations can be both local and systemic. The geohelminths together present an enormous infection burden on humanity, amounting to 135,000 deaths every year, and persistent infection of more than two billion people.

== Species ==
Soil-transmitted helminths are typically from the following families of nematodes, namely:

- Roundworms (family Ascarididae), e.g. Ascaris lumbricoides
- Whipworms (family Trichuridae), e.g. Trichuris trichiura
- Hookworms (family Ancylostomatidae), e.g. Ancylostoma duodenale and Necator americanus
- Threadworms (family Strongyloididae), e.g. Strongyloides stercoralis

== Diseases ==
=== Soil-transmitted helminthiasis ===
Soil-transmitted helminthiasis is a collective name for the diseases caused by ascaris, whipworm and hookworms in humans. It includes species-specific diseases such as

- Ascariasis, which is caused by Ascaris lumbricoides
- Hookworm diseases (ancylostomiasis and necatoriasis), which are caused by Necator americanus and Ancylostoma duodenale
- Trichuriasis, which is caused by Trichuris trichiura

Soil-transmitted helminthiasis is classified as one of the neglected tropical diseases projected to be controlled/eradicated by 2020 through the London Declaration on Neglected Tropical Diseases.

==== Strongyloidiasis ====
This is caused by Strongyloides stercoralis. Even though the disease is principally a soil-transmitted helminthiasis, the infection being mediated through contaminated soil, it is however generally omitted in clinical practices and control programmes because of its (allegedly) relatively less significant influence on health and socio-economic conditions. Also it is not restricted to humans, as it is common in pets. But there is an emerging hyperinfection syndrome caused by S. stercoralis, which exhibits a high mortality rate (15% to 87%).

== General impact ==
Geohelminth infection is a major health problem particularly in rural areas of developing countries like Subsaharan Africa, India and other Southeast Asian countries. It is an important cause of morbidity in school age children who harbour the highest intensity of worm infestation. Some of the significant morbidity attributed to intestinal helminthiasis are malnutrition, growth retardation, anaemia, vitamin A deficiency and impaired intellectual performance.

== Control activities ==
The World Health Organization is promoting the control of soil transmitted helminthiasis with large scale, regular distribution of anthelminthics (albendazole or mebendazole) to the population groups more at risk of morbidity (children and women of reproductive age). The number of school-age children treated with PC has progressed steadily from less than 120 million in 2008 to over 450 million in 2018 and is in continuous expansion.
