= Eradication of dracunculiasis =

Logarithmic scale of reported Guinea Worm Cases 1989–2024

The eradication of dracunculiasis, or Guinea worm disease, is an ongoing program. Dracunculiasis is an infection by the Guinea worm that causes severe pain and open wounds when guinea worms exit the body through the skin. In 1986, there were an estimated 3.5 million cases of Guinea worm in 20 endemic nations in Asia and Africa. The number of human cases has since been reduced by more than 99.999%, to the range of 10–15 per year in 2021–2025, with only six countries remaining to be certified free of transmission: Chad, South Sudan, Mali, Ethiopia, Angola, and Sudan. Cameroon has also had some cases in recent years, primarily due to its proximity to Chad, but was previously certified free of internal transmission.

The campaign has been spearheaded by the Carter Center and other members of the London Declaration on Neglected Tropical Diseases, with former U.S. president Jimmy Carter as part of its deworming programs, designed to eliminate neglected tropical diseases. Discussing his diagnosis of melanoma (which had metastasized to his brain), Carter said in 2015 that his last wish was to see the last Guinea worm dead before he was. Carter died in 2024 without quite seeing that wish fulfilled.

The World Health Organization (WHO) is the recognized international body that certifies whether a disease has been eliminated from a country or eradicated from the world. The WHO renewed its expressed intent to accelerate the eradication of dracunculiasis at its World Health Assembly in May 2025. The Carter Center issues frequent reports on the status of the Guinea worm eradication program, including country-by-country statistics.

As of 2024, the WHO goal for eradication in humans and animals is the year 2030. Previously, 1991, 2009, 2015, and 2020 were set as target years, but full eradication of dracunculiasis has proven to be much more difficult than originally thought, after the discovery of non-human animal hosts. Although the frequency of human cases has plateaued since the beginning of 2021, the frequency of cases in animals has continued to trend downward. Guinea worm is poised to be the second human disease to be eradicated, after smallpox.

== Eradication program ==
Progress towards guinea worm disease eradication

Formerly, humans were believed to be the only host for Guinea worms, and it was thought that once all human cases were eliminated, the disease cycle would be broken, resulting in its eradication. However, in the mid-2010s, it became clear that dracunculiasis had other animal hosts besides humans, greatly complicating eradication efforts, which now also had to be expanded to non-human hosts.

The eradication of Guinea worm disease has faced several challenges:

- Non-human host reservoir
- Inadequate security in some endemic countries
- Lack of political will from the leaders of some of the countries in which the disease is endemic
- The need for change in behavior in the absence of a magic bullet treatment like a vaccine or medication
- Inadequate funding at certain times

In January 2012 the WHO meeting at the Royal College of Physicians in London launched the most ambitious and largest coalition health project ever, known as London Declaration on Neglected Tropical Diseases which aims to end/control dracunculiasis by 2020, among other neglected tropical diseases. This project is supported by all major pharmaceutical companies, the Bill & Melinda Gates Foundation, the United States Agency for International Development, the United Kingdom Department for International Development, the Carter Center, and the World Bank, in cooperation with the governments of countries in which the disease is endemic.

By 2018, the disease was eliminated in 19 of 21 countries where it used to occur. By the end of the London Declaration programme, only 15 cases were recorded globally. Total eradication is projected by the Kigali Declaration on Neglected Tropical Diseases starting from 2022 to 2030.

== Countries certified free ==
Endemic countries must report to the International Commission for the Certification of Dracunculiasis Eradication and document the absence of indigenous cases of Guinea worm disease for at least three consecutive years to be certified as Guinea worm-free by the World Health Organization.

The result of this certification scheme is that by 2007, Benin, Burkina Faso, Chad, Ivory Coast, Kenya, Mauritania, Togo, and Uganda were able to certify that they had stopped transmission, and Cameroon, Central African Republic, India, Pakistan, Senegal, and Yemen were WHO certified. Nigeria was certified as having ended transmission in 2013, followed by Ghana in 2015, and the Democratic Republic of Congo in 2022.

== Endemic countries ==
Through the eradication campaign, the areas where dracunculiasis is found are shrinking. In the early 1980s, the disease was endemic in Pakistan, Yemen and 17 countries in Africa with a total of 3.5 million cases per year. In 1985, 3.5 million cases were still reported annually, but by 2008, the number had dropped to 5,000. This number further dropped to 1,058 in 2011. At the end of 2015, South Sudan, Mali, Ethiopia and Chad still had endemic transmissions. However, endemic transmission was discovered in Angola and Cameroon in 2018 and 2019 respectively. For many years the major focus was South Sudan (independent after 2011, formerly the southern region of Sudan), which reported 76% of all cases in 2013, but the last few cases are spread over several African countries.

Date	South Sudan	Mali	Ethiopia	Chad	Angola	Cameroon (Note: Imported from Chad.)	Total
2011	1,028	12	8	10	0	0	1,058
2012	521	7	4	10	0	0	542
2013	116 (Note: Including 3 exported to Sudan.)	11	7	14	0	0	148
2014	70	40	3	13	0	0	126
2015	5	5	3	9	0	0	22
2016	6	0	3	16	0	0	25
2017	0	0	15	15	0	0	30
2018	10	0	0	17	1	0	28
2019	4	0	0	48	1	1	54
2020	1	1	11	12	1	1	27
2021	4	2	1	8	0	0	15
2022	5	0	1	7 (Note: Including 1 exported to Central African Republic.)	0	0	13
2023	2	1	0	9	0	1	14 (Note: Including 1 in Central African Republic.)
2024	6	0	0	9	0	0	15
2025	2	0	4	4	0	0	10
2026	0	1	1	1	2	0	5

== Timeline of events ==
=== 1980s ===
In 1984, the WHO asked the United States Centers for Disease Control and Prevention (CDC) to spearhead the effort to eradicate dracunculiasis, an effort that was further supported by the Carter Center, former U.S. President Jimmy Carter's not-for-profit organization. In 1986, Carter and the Carter Center began leading the global campaign, in conjunction with CDC, UNICEF, and WHO. At that time the disease was endemic in Pakistan, Yemen and 17 countries in Africa, which reported a total of 3.5 million cases per year.

Carter made a personal visit to a Guinea-worm endemic village in 1988. He said, "Encountering those victims first-hand, particularly the teenagers and small children, propelled me and Rosalynn [Carter] to step up the Carter Center's efforts to eradicate Guinea worm disease."

=== 1990s ===
In 1991, the World Health Assembly agreed that Guinea worm disease should be eradicated. At this time there were 400,000 cases reported each year. The Carter Center has continued to lead the eradication efforts, primarily through its Guinea Worm Eradication Program.

In the 1980s, Carter persuaded President Zia-ul-Haq of Pakistan to accept the proposal of the eradication program, and by 1993, Pakistan was free of the disease. Key to the effort was, according to Carter, the work of "village volunteers" who educated people about the need to filter drinking water.

=== 2000s ===
Other countries followed the example of Pakistan, and by 2004, Guinea worm was eradicated in Asia.

In December 2008, The Carter Center announced new financial support totaling $55 million from the Bill & Melinda Gates Foundation and the United Kingdom Department for International Development. The funds will help address the higher cost of identifying and reporting the last cases of Guinea worm disease. Since the worm has a one-year incubation period, there is a very high cost of maintaining a broad and sensitive monitoring system and providing a rapid response when necessary.

One of the most significant challenges facing Guinea worm eradication during the 1990s was the Second Sudanese Civil War, which made Southern Sudan largely inaccessible to health workers due to violence. To address some of the humanitarian needs in Southern Sudan, Jimmy Carter negotiated a ceasefire—commonly called the "Guinea Worm ceasefire"—in 1995. The longest ceasefire in the Second Sudanese Civil War, as well as the longest humanitarian ceasefire in history, the Guinea worm ceasefire saw both warring parties agree to halt hostilities for nearly six months to allow public health officials to begin Guinea worm eradication programming, among other interventions.

Public health officials cite the formal end of the war in 2005 as a turning point in Guinea worm eradication because it allowed health care workers greater access to Southern Sudan's endemic areas. In 2006, there was an increase from 5,569 cases in 2005 to 15,539 cases, as a result of better reporting from areas that were no longer war-torn. The Southern Sudan Guinea Worm Eradication Program deployed over 28,000 village volunteers, supervisors and other health staff to work on the program full-time. The program slashed the number of cases reported in 2006 by 63% to 5,815 cases in 2007. By the time of South Sudan's 2011 independence, its northern neighbour Sudan reported no endemic cases of dracunculiasis.

Sporadic insecurity or widespread civil conflict could at any time ignite, thwarting eradication efforts. The remaining endemic communities in South Sudan are remote, poor and devoid of infrastructure, presenting significant hurdles for effective delivery of interventions against disease. Moreover, residents in these communities are nomadic, moving seasonally with cattle in pursuit of water and pasture, making it very difficult to know where and when transmission occurred. The peak transmission season coincides with the rainy season, hampering travel by public health workers.

Another remaining area in Africa remained challenging to ending Guinea worm: northern Mali, where Tuareg rebels made some affected areas unsafe for health workers. Four of Mali's regions (Kayes, Koulikoro, Ségou, and Sikasso) have eliminated dracunculiasis, while the disease is still endemic in the country's other four regions (Gao, Kidal, Mopti, and Timbuktu). Late detection of two outbreaks, due to inadequate surveillance resulted in a meager 36% containment rate in Mali in 2007. The years 2008 and 2009 were more successful, however, with containment rates of 85% and 73% respectively. The civil war prevented accurate information from being gathered in northern Mali in 2012.

In Ghana, after a decade of frustration and stagnation, in 2006 a decisive turnaround was achieved. Multiple changes can be attributed to the improved containment and lower incidence of dracunculiasis: better supervision and accountability, active oversight of infected people daily by paid staff, and an intensified public awareness campaign. After Jimmy Carter's visit to Ghana in August 2006, the government of Ghana declared Guinea worm disease to be a public health emergency. The overall rate of contained cases has increased in Ghana from 60% in 2005, to 75% in 2006, 84% in 2007, 85% in 2008, 93% in 2009, and 100% in 2010.

From June 2006 to March 2008, there were no cases reported in Ethiopia. No indigenous cases were reported in Chad in the 2000s; however, the country was known to have poor surveillance.

=== 2010s ===
==== 2011 ====
In 2011, 1,060 human cases were reported—1,030 in South Sudan, 12 in Mali, 10 in Chad, and 8 in Ethiopia. The majority of cases in South Sudan were in Kapoeta East County, and Kapoeta North County. These adjacent counties are in the state of Eastern Equatoria. Of the 70 counties in South Sudan, 56 (80%) are considered free of dracunculiasis.

The cases reported in Chad were part of an outbreak that was originally identified in 2010 as part of a pre-certification process. Chad had not reported any cases between 2001 and 2009. Two of the cases in Ethiopia were imported from South Sudan. Ghana appears to have eradicated guinea worm. In August 2011, their public health officials reported that Ghana was free of reported cases for over 14 months. While promising, given the incubation period, it will be some time before the WHO certifies Ghana as free of this disease. After South Sudan separated from Northern Sudan, Northern Sudan has been free of guinea worm disease since 2002 and it has been certified free of this disease by the WHO. Burkina Faso and Togo were both certified free of dracunculiasis in 2011, as the last endemic cases were in November 2006 and December 2006, respectively.

==== 2012 ====
In 2012, 542 human cases were reported—521 in South Sudan, 10 in Chad, 7 in Mali, and 4 in Ethiopia. This represents a 49% reduction compared to 2011. The containment rate was 64%.

However, since March 2012, Mali's Guinea Worm Eradication Program workers have had limited access to northern Mali due to the Tuareg rebellion (2012), and were not able to investigate cases there. Médecins du Monde reported rumours of a further 5 unconfirmed cases in northern Mali since March.

==== 2013 ====
In 2013, 148 human cases were reported—113 in South Sudan, 14 in Chad, 11 in Mali and 7 in Ethiopia, and 3 in Sudan (imported from South Sudan). This represents a 73% reduction over 2012. Due to civil insecurity in South Sudan, monitoring was suspended in parts of the country in December. Containment was 66%. After a decade without any reported cases, it is clear that dracunculiasis has since reestablished itself in Chad. There were concerns that surveillance vigilance has decreased, and renewed efforts were made to increase monitoring. This includes coordinating monitoring with its neighbours Nigeria and Cameroon.

Ivory Coast, Niger, and Nigeria were all certified free of dracunculiasis in 2013, as the last endemic cases were in November 2006, October 2008, and November 2008, respectively.

==== 2014 ====
In 2014, 126 human cases were reported—70 in South Sudan, 40 in Mali, 13 in Chad, and 3 in Ethiopia. 13% fewer Guinea worms emerged from humans in 2014 compared to 2013 (172 vs. 197), and 57% fewer villages had indigenous cases (30 vs. 69). The figure for total worms emerging is larger than new cases because a person may be infected by more than 1 worm, and it may emerge many months later than when the case is first reported. The big drop in cases was again in South Sudan. Containment increased from 66% to 73%, mainly due to Mali's 24% improvement to 88%. The increase of the reward for reporting cases of the disease in South Sudan, Ethiopia and Mali from the equivalent of about US$50 to about US$100 has improved reporting, as did the campaign to advertise this reward in Mali. In Mali, part of the increase has been caused by improved security allowing more of the country to be monitored. While parts of the country were still not monitored, all known endemic areas were covered. Advertising the increased reward for reporting cases may have allowed cases to be found earlier, and so contained before the victims become a risk of spreading the parasite.

A report from the WHO Collaborating Center for Research, Training and Eradication of Dracunculiasis, CDC noted two specific problems encountered while eliminating the last few cases in Chad—some dogs seemed to be infected with the parasite, and the large number, size and heavy vegetation of lagoons used by fishermen reducing the effectiveness of the Abate larvicide. It is likely that the disease is being caused by eating undercooked fish from these sources. The Carter Center reported the general consensus that in Chad the disease has found an alternate host in dogs, and will have to be eradicated from both humans and dogs.

==== 2015 ====
In 2015, 22 human cases were reported—9 in Chad, 3 in Ethiopia, 5 in Mali, and 5 in South Sudan. The proportion of people contained was 36%, compared to 73% in 2014. That means 14 cases were not contained in 2015, compared to 34 cases in 2014. Nine of these 14 cases not contained were in Chad. Ghana was certified free of dracunculiasis in 2015, as the last endemic case was in May 2010.

A significant change from 2014 was the increased effort being used to identify and treat infected dogs—mainly in Chad where the vast majority of cases of dogs hosting the worm were found, but also significantly in Ethiopia. In 2015, 483 infected dogs were identified and treated in Chad—more than 20 times the number reported in humans worldwide. This was more than four times larger than the number treated in 2014 (114 dogs). A major factor in this increase was probably the financial reward started in January for reporting an infected dog. 68% of dogs treated were also contained, compared to 40% in 2014. Dogs are now believed to be the major source of the parasite infecting humans in Chad, a country in which no indigenous cases of guinea worm were reported in the decade leading up to 2010. Fifteen dogs outside Chad were also identified and treated, as well five cats and one baboon. The August Carter Center report predicts that Chad may be the last country that eliminates dracunculiasis, and reports on further ongoing research into the relationship between the parasite and dogs there, and some different treatments for dogs.

==== 2016 ====
In 2016, 25 human cases were reported—16 in Chad, 6 in South Sudan, and 3 in Ethiopia. No cases were reported in Mali. This was the first increase in yearly case count. The 2016 Juba clashes in South Sudan led to the evacuation of all expatriate staff from the Southern Sudan Guinea Worm Eradication Program. Members of the local staff were given the option of continuing to work if possible. It is unclear what impact the evacuation had.

The efforts against infected dogs continue to increase in Chad, with 498 dogs being identified and treated up to 31 May, compared to 196 cases in the same period the previous year. The level of containment of infected dogs before they become a risk of spreading the parasite has improved to 81% compared to 67% last year. By the end of 2016, Chad reported provisional totals of 1,011 infected domestic dogs (66% contained), 11 infected domestic cats (55% contained), and one infected wild frog. Mali reported 11 infected dogs (8/11 contained) in 2016, and Ethiopia reported 14 infected dogs (71% contained), and two infected baboons.

==== 2017 ====
In 2017, 30 human cases were reported—15 in Chad, and 15 in Ethiopia; 13 of which were fully contained. For the first time ever, South Sudan reported no human infections for a whole calendar year: the last reported case was on 20 November 2016. No human cases were reported in Mali for the second year in a row.

In addition to their human cases, Chad reported 817 infected dogs and 13 infected domestic cats, and Ethiopia reported 11 infected dogs and 4 infected baboons. Despite no human infections, Mali reported 9 infected dogs and 1 infected cat.

==== 2018 ====
In 2018, 28 human cases were reported worldwide: 17 in Chad, 10 in South Sudan and one in Angola. In terms of animal cases Chad has so far reported 832 infections in dogs and 17 infections in domestic cats, Mali reported six infected dogs and two infected domestic cats, and Ethiopia reported eight infected dogs and three infected domestic cats.

On June 29, a case was reported in Angola, a country not known to have had any cases in the past.

At the end of 2018, 28 human cases and 1,102 animal cases were reported. Of the animal cases 1,069 were in dogs, 32 in cats and one in a baboon.

==== 2019 ====
By the end of 2019, 54 human cases had been reported: one case each in Angola and Cameroon, four cases in South Sudan and 48 cases in Chad. In addition to this:

- Angola reported a single animal case;
- Mali reported nine animal cases;
- Chad reported 1,899 animal cases, the vast majority in dogs (but a few also in cats);
- Ethiopia reported eight animal cases, including a case in a baboon.

A trial of flubendazole to treat dogs was started.

The World Health Organization revised its target date for eradication from 2020 to 2030, citing civil conflicts and new information about transmission between humans and dogs. The new goal includes eradication in both humans and animals.

=== 2020s ===
==== 2020 ====
At the end of 2020, 27 total cases had been reported: 1 case each in Angola, Cameroon, Mali, and South Sudan, 11 cases in Ethiopia, and 12 cases in Chad. In addition:

- Mali reported 8 animal cases;
- Ethiopia reported 15 animal cases;
- Chad reported 1,570 animal cases.

==== 2021 ====
In 2021, 15 cases were reported, of which eight cases were in Chad, four cases in South Sudan, two in Mali, and one in Ethiopia. The single Ethiopian case was a family member of a previously infected individual and the case was contained. 863 animal cases were reported, almost entirely in cats and dogs.

==== 2022 ====
In 2022, 13 cases were reported, of which six were in Chad, five were in South Sudan and one case each in Ethiopia and the Central African Republic. The single case in the Central African Republic was apparently imported from Chad. In addition:

- Chad reported 606 animal cases
- Mali reported 41 animal cases
- Cameroon reported 28 animal cases
- Angola reported 7 animal cases
- Ethiopia reported 3 animal cases
- South Sudan reported 1 animal case

==== 2023 ====
In 2023, 14 human cases of Guinea worm were reported, of which nine were in Chad, two were in South Sudan, one case each was reported in Mali, Central African Republic, and Cameroon. Additionally, 885 animals were infected in Chad, Cameroon, Angola, Mali, Ethiopia and South Sudan. In 2023 the WHO's Control of Neglected Tropical Diseases Team set the following criteria for WHO certification of eradication:

[E]limination will be considered to have been achieved when surveillance systems have not discovered any evidence of transmission in humans or animals despite rigorous annual searches, carried out during the expected transmission season, for 3 consecutive years. For surveillance to be deemed adequate, this should include the submission of evidence of reporting active searches for human cases and animal infections, if necessary, even in the most remote and difficult-to-access areas of the country.

The objective of surveillance for dracunculiasis during the 3-year precertification period is to rapidly detect and contain any human cases or animal infections that might occur, to prevent further transmission. Confirmation of the absence of transmission in a country is judged based on: (i) an assessment of the capability of the surveillance system to detect human cases and animal infections should they occur; and

(ii) the records compiled by the national authorities, the quality of which can be determined during a field appraisal by an ICT. In general, the reliability of certification will depend on the amount of time that has elapsed since the last known human case or animal infection and on the sensitivity of active surveillance.

==== 2024 ====
In 2024, there were 15 human cases of Guinea worm. 9 of the cases were in Chad and 6 were in South Sudan. Animal cases declined by 25% from 2023 to reach a total of 664 cases, primarily in Chad and Cameroon.

==== 2025 ====
There were 10 confirmed human cases of Guinea worm in 2025: 2 in South Sudan, 4 in Chad and 4 in Ethiopia. As of November 2025, there had also been more than 600 animal infections in Angola, Cameroon, Chad and Mali.

==== 2026 ====
Up to August 2026, there were 5 confirmed cases of Guinea worm in humans: one in Chad, two in Angola, one in Mali and one in Ethiopia. There were over 500 animal infections in Cameroon, Chad, Angola and Mali.

== See also ==
- Eradication of infectious diseases
  - Eradication of lymphatic filariasis, another nematode worm disease affecting humans with an ongoing effort toward eradication
  - Eradication of polio, a viral disease affecting humans, remaining endemic in only two countries (Afghanistan and Pakistan)
  - Eradication of rinderpest, a viral disease affecting cattle and other even-toed ungulates, eradicated in 2001
  - Eradication of smallpox, a viral disease affecting humans, eradicated in 1977
