= Lymphatic filariasis in India =

Prominence and Spread of a disease in India

Lymphatic filariasis in India refers to the presence of the disease lymphatic filariasis in India and the social response to the disease. In India, 99% of infections come from a type of mosquito spreading a type of worm through a mosquito bite. The treatment plan provides 400 million people in India with medication to eliminate the parasite. About 50 million people in India were carrying the worm as of the early 2010s, which is 40% of all the cases in the world. In collaboration with other countries around the world, India is participating in a global effort to eradicate lymphatic filariasis. If the worm is eliminated from India then the disease could be permanently eradicated. In October 2019 the Union health minister Harsh Vardhan said that India's current plan is on schedule to eradicate filariasis by 2021.

To treat, prevent, and eliminate the disease, the Indian government provides mass drug administration (MDA) to achieve mass deworming. The treatment is a few pills taken once a year for five years. The medication provided is diethylcarbamazine. For the treatment to work 60-80% of people in large regions must take this yearly treatment for several years.

== Treatment ==
Treatment is done through a public health initiative in which most people in regions with the parasite take treatment. The treatment is a mass drug administration to cause mass deworming. In India the worm only lives in humans, so if everyone takes treatment, and everyone is cured, then the worm will be permanently eradicated. India participates in the global eradication program to eliminate the worm worldwide.

Health education for the public is an essential part of the campaign. Hundreds of millions of people in affected communities have to agree to take the drugs once a year. In a 2015 public health campaign called Hathipaon Mukt Bharat shows how the disease causes large feet, says the medicine is safe, and tells people to take it.

The treatment program varies in different places in India. Various reports describe the variation, such as for Assam and Andhra Pradesh.

Most people who take treatment have no negative effects or only mild adverse events which resolve without further treatment. A bigger problem than any side effects of treatment is people having fear of taking treatment, which leads them to refuse to take medicine. Various studies have examined why people in various Indian regions neglect to take the drugs.

== Vector ==
99% of infections in India happen when the mosquito Culex quinquefasciatus spreads the worm Wuchereria bancrofti through a mosquito bite. Because the cause of this disease can be a different worm and parasite in different countries, each country has its own plan for control and treatment.

The typical prevention for filariasis is through the use of medication. However, in some areas, using the pesticide spinosad to eliminate mosquitoes is helpful to prevent the spread.

To eliminate the disease neither humans nor mosquitoes should have the parasite. The usual way to determine whether filariasis is eliminated from an area is to test humans for the parasite. In some special cases India uses molecular xenomonitoring to examine captured mosquitoes and determine if they carry the parasite.

== Epidemiology ==
By 2006 there were 20 million people infected and with symptoms, 30 million people infected but asymptomatic, and 470 million people who were at potential risk. In 2005 95% of the cases in India were in Andhra Pradesh, Bihar, Gujarat, Kerala, Maharashtra, Orissa, Tamil Nadu, Uttar Pradesh and West Bengal.

India has 40% of the world's lymphatic filariasis (LF) cases. For patients, one of the major costs of treating the disease is that of being unable to work for some time. A year 2000 survey reported that about half the people in India were at risk of contracting LF. Men and women are equally susceptible to this disease, but in the past, there have been barriers to women accessing treatment. An estimate from the year 2000 reported that filariasis in India caused an annual economic loss of ₹5000 crore (US$1,000,000,000).

== Society and culture ==
The Sushruta Samhita, an Ayurvedic Indian text, described filariasis in the 6th century BCE. The disease is timeless and present throughout Indian history. Indian physicians in the 500s wrote about the disease. In the 1500s the European explorer Jan Huyghen van Linschoten visited Goa and wrote about people with filariasis symptoms there.

In 1955 the Indian government established the National Filaria Control Programme (NFCP) as a project to limit the spread of the disease. By 1959 that organization proposed various plans for controlling or eliminating the disease. Infections spread out of control from 1955 until 1995 in which time the number of cases increased several fold. Reasons for the disease's expansion included increased urban population and a rapidly changing country which exposed people to new circumstances with mosquitoes.

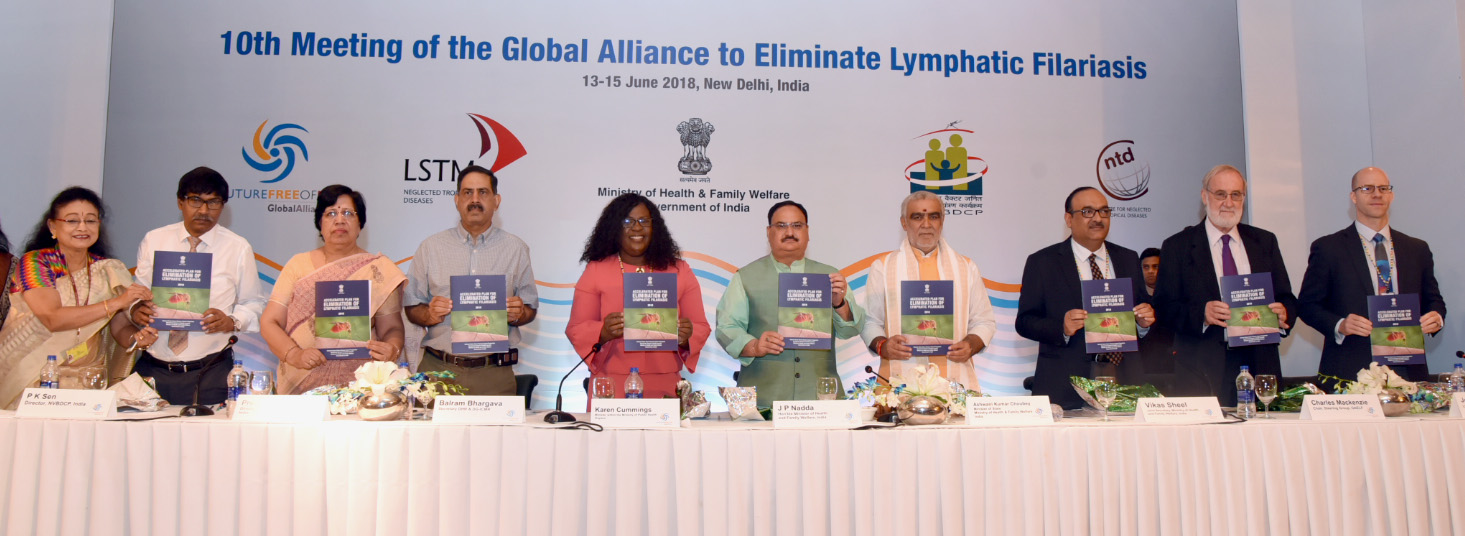
Various people in Delhi present a 2018 plan for eliminating LF with government support of J.P. Nadda

In 1997 India joined a World Health Assembly resolution to eliminate LF by 2020. In India to achieve this goal healthcare must be very accessible to almost everyone at risk for the disease. The Indian government originally planned to eliminate the disease by 2015, then shifted the date to 2017, then to 2020. Various media outlets have discussed how India might meet the goal or what it should happen next if more time is required.

In 2015 the Indian government launched a health campaign called Hathipaon Mukt Bharat (Filaria Free India) to encourage public participation in eliminating LF. In the program everyone in an area with the disease takes pill medicine once a year for five years. The drug is diethylcarbamazine citrate and albendazole and is in the form of about four pills which people take all at once.

== Research ==
Public health researchers have applied machine learning techniques to improve public health monitoring for filariasis in India.

A 2019 report identified dogs in Kerala who have another worm which can cause filariasis, Brugia malayi. This worm is not known to infect people in India. If necessary tests are ready to identify the dogs carrying the disease.

== Further consideration ==
- Das, PK; Pani, SP; Krishnamoorthy, K (June 2002), "Prospects of eliminating lymphatic filariasis in India" (PDF), ICMR Bulletin, New Delhi: Indian Council of Medical Research
- Kazmin, Amy (2017). "The race to zero: how to eliminate an ancient disease". Financial Times.
