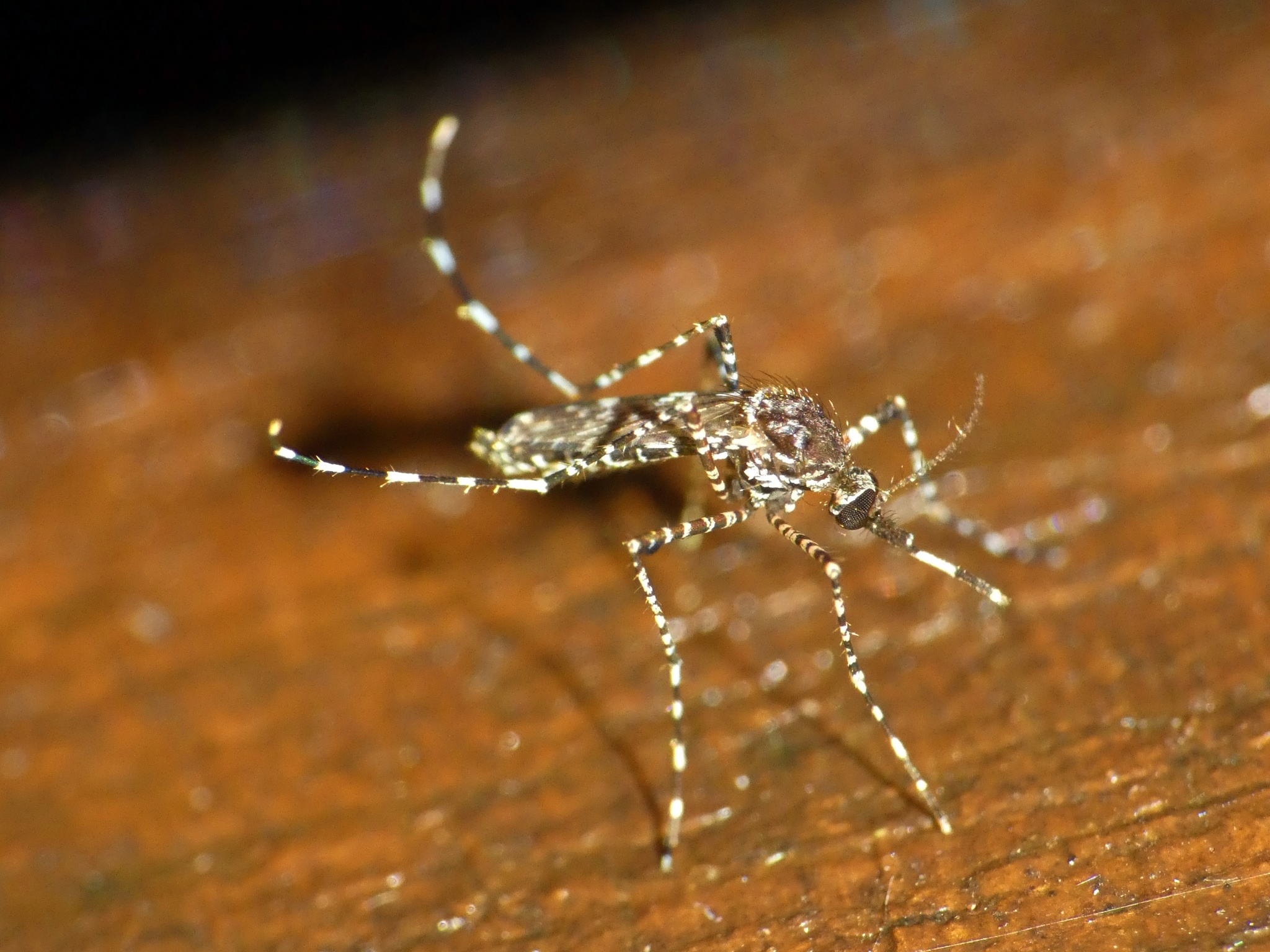

Scientific classification
- Kingdom: Animalia
- Phylum: Arthropoda
- Clade: Pancrustacea
- Class: Insecta
- Order: Diptera
- Family: Culicidae
- Genus: Aedes
- Subgenus: Finlaya
- Species: A. kochi

Binomial name
- Aedes kochi (Dönitz, 1901)

= Aedes kochi =

Species of mosquito

Aedes kochi is a species of mosquito in the genus Aedes, subgenus Finlaya. It is primarily found in Australia, Indonesia, the Philippines, Samoa, the Solomon Islands, and Tonga, and is known for its ornate appearance and its role as a vector of lymphatic filariasis.

== Taxonomy ==
Aedes kochi was first described by Dönitz in 1901. It belongs to the Kochi Group within the subgenus Finlaya.

== Distribution ==
Aedes kochi is distributed across tropical and subtropical regions, including Australia, Indonesia, the Philippines, Samoa, the Solomon Islands, and Tonga.

== Disease transmission ==
Aedes kochi is a key vector of lymphatic filariasis, a parasitic disease caused by Wuchereria bancrofti.
