= Kigali Declaration on Neglected Tropical Diseases =

Global health project, launched in 2022

The Kigali Declaration on Neglected Tropical Diseases is a global health project that aims to mobilise political and financial resources for the control and eradication of infectious diseases, the so-called neglected tropical diseases. Launched by the Uniting to Combat Neglected Tropical Diseases on 27 January 2022, it was the culmination and join commitment declared at the Kigali Summit on Malaria and Neglected Tropical Diseases (NTDs) hosted by the Government of Rwanda at Kigali on 23 June 2022.

The declaration was launched as a support for the World Health Organization's 2021–30 road map for NTDs and the target of Sustainable Development Goal 3 to end NTD epidemics; and as a follow-up project of the London Declaration on Neglected Tropical Diseases. Supported by WHO, governments of the Commonwealth of Nations pledged the endorsement, along with commitments from pharmaceutical companies including GSK plc, Novartis, Pfizer, Sightsavers and the Wellcome Trust.

== Background ==
The World Health Organization classified 20 major diseases as neglected tropical diseases (NTD), while finer classifications consider several additional conditions. The diseases collectively had affected almost 2 billion people worldwide every year, causing about 200,000 deaths and almost 50 disability adjusted life years annually. In 2012, WHO published its first NTD road map for 2012–2020. NTDs are not deadly diseases, and are often ignored, described as "diseases of poverty and inequality"; but are responsible for large-scale economic problems, health issues, and educational backwardness. For achieving the goals of the road map, the London Declaration on Neglected Tropical Diseases, spearheaded by the Bill & Melinda Gates Foundation, was launched on 30 January 2012. The project was supported by major pharmaceutical companies, in addition to governments and organisations.

As the London Declaration terminated, there were considerable successes in disease control. Although no disease was eradicated globally, many of the target infections were eliminated in several countries, with 42 countries having eliminated at least one disease. One of the biggest successes was the control of Guinea worm disease (dracunculiasis). The disease was eliminated in 19 of 21 countries; by 2021, only 15 cases were recorded globally. NTDs were still a major health concern, affecting 1.7 billion people worldwide, 35% of who are in Africa. Tanzania, for example, had the highest cases of NTDs; more than 29 million Tanzanians, almost half the population, required treatment for at least one NTD, and 19 million of the children were at risk of intestinal worms.

In November 2020, the 73rd World Health Assembly announced the WHO's 2021–2030 road map for NTDs, to prevent, control, eliminate and eradicate these diseases. The new road map aims to:

- reduce the number of people requiring treatment for NTDs by 90%;
- eliminate at least one NTD in at least 100 countries;
- eradicate dracunculiasis and yaws;
- reduce the disability-adjusted life years (DALYs) related to NTD by 75%.

As the new road map was announced, there was a need for another complimentary project to continue the London Declaration. In 2021, a new programme called the Kigali Declaration on Neglected Tropical Diseases was prepared by the Government of Rwanda with a support from the Uniting to Combat Neglected Tropical Diseases. It was publicised for responses throughout that year.

== Launching ==
The Uniting to Combat Neglected Tropical Diseases launched the Kigali Declaration as a "100% Committed" (the name of the campaign) political movement on 27 January 2022. Édouard Ngirente, Prime Minister of Rwanda, Muhammadu Buhari, President of Nigeria, Samia Suluhu Hassan, President of Tanzania, and James Marape, Prime Minister of Papua New Guinea, were present at the announcement and endorsed the project. On the occasion, Mark Suzman, CEO of the Bill & Melinda Gates Foundation, said:

The partnership between the private and public sectors on NTDs, exemplified by the London Declaration, has led to one of the great public health successes of the past decade. The sheer scale of the accomplishment – one billion people reached with treatments each year for the past five years – means that hundreds of millions fewer people are at risk compared to 2012. The Bill & Melinda Gates Foundation is pleased to join many of our long-standing partners in welcoming the new, country-led Kigali Declaration to build on this incredible progress. Funding for NTDs is an investment in health equity–with a focus on integrating NTDs into strengthened health systems, the Kigali Declaration promises a chance at a healthier life for people affected by these debilitating diseases.

The declaration was publicly announced by the WHO on the third World NTD Day on 30 January 2022. Gautam Biswas, acting Director, WHO Department of Control of Neglected Tropical Diseases, stated: "Progress achieved over the last decade is the result of the excellent public-private partnership with countries endemic for NTDs and the unfaltering support of partners who endorsed the London Declaration in 2012. It is exciting to see political will gearing up around the Kigali Declaration to achieve the new road map targets for 2030."

=== Official launching ===
The African Union and the Uniting to Combat NTDs signed a memorandum for the declaration on 29 March 2022. They agreed that the declaration would be launched as a global project at the Kigali Summit on Malaria and NTDs, to be held alongside the 26th Commonwealth Heads of Government meeting in Rwanda. The declaration was officially launched by Paul Kagame, President of the Republic of Rwanda, at the Kigali Summit on 23 June 2022. Kagame stated:

Ensuring that all African countries mobilise the domestic financial resources required for quality health care is a priority for the African Union and our partners. If there is one thing the pandemic has taught us, it is that together, through coordinated and collaborative action, we can achieve much more.

It was endorsed with commitments from donor governments, endemic country governments, pharmaceutical companies, organisations, with US$1.5 billion in financial commitments and 18 billion donated tablets. The commitment immediately rose to US$1.5 billion and 18 billion medications from pharmaceutical companies.

== Goals ==
The declaration aims to create the "world's largest public-private partnership" to reduce the number of infection by 90% and eliminate at least one NTD in 100 countries by 2030, as stated in the WHO road map. Specific eradication targets are Guinea worm disease and yaws that were almost eradicated under the London Declaration project. It also aims to "ensure that people affected by NTDs – particularly women and girls, persons with disabilities, and minority and underrepresented groups – are at the center of NTD programs and decision-making processes." This is because women and girls are prone to infections as their daily chores involve washing and visiting parasite-infested water bodies.

The main statement runs:

Building on the progress of the London Declaration on Neglected Tropical Diseases (NTDs) and putting individuals and communities at the centre of the NTD response, we, the signatories of this declaration, come together to commit to ending NTDs. We acknowledge that NTDs are diseases of poverty and inequity. By tackling NTDs we will reduce poverty, address inequity, strengthen health systems, increase human capital and build resilient communities, bringing us closer to achieving universal health coverage and the SDGs. This declaration is for and in service of the 1.7 billion people who continue to suffer from NTDs.

== Endorsements and commitments ==
=== Main partners ===
1. GSK plc (GlaxoSmithKline): The British multinational pharmaceutical will continue its albendazole donation programme that includes providing albendazole until lymphatic filariasis is eliminated, expand its soil-transmitted helminths donation programme to include pre-school children, and extend the donation programme for echinococcosis. It also committed to invest GBP£1 billion for research and development on NTD eliminations for the period of the declaration. It had established a non-commercial Global Health Unit to disseminate its programme and products.
2. Novartis: The Swiss multinational pharmaceutical company agreed to invest US$250 million for research and development into new treatments for malaria and NTDs till 2015, including $150 million for its NTD programme that focusses drug development for dengue, leishmaniasis, Chagas disease, and cryptosporidiosis.
3. Pfizer: The New York-based American multinational pharmaceutical corporation will continue its donation of azithromycin for trachoma, the world's leading infectious cause of blindness, until 2030. It will continue to target 13 countries validated for elimination, which it had supported through the International Trachoma Initiative since 1999.
4. Sightsavers: An international non-governmental organisation based in England pledged at least US$25 million to the fight against NTDs.
5. Wellcome Trust: The British healthcare charity organisation committed to provide GBP£80 million worth of funding towards medication for snakebite envenoming. WHO added snakebite to the list of NTDs in 2017.

=== Additional supporters ===
1. American Leprosy Mission: The American charity organisation will support leprosy research, including testing the first leprosy-specific vaccine, LepVax, and investigation of new diagnosis and detect drug resistance.
2. Bayer AG: The German multinational pharmaceutical and biotechnology company will donate essential medicines for sleeping sickness, Chagas disease, and taeniasis until 2030.
3. Bill & Melinda Gates Foundation: The global charity organisation mainly focussed on malaria as its commitment to WHO NTD road map; but it also supports the establishment the Mwele Malecela Mentorship Program for Women in NTDs and the Accelerate Resilient, Innovative, and Sustainable Elimination of NTDs (ARISE) schemes that are specific for NTDs.
4. Drugs for Neglected Diseases Initiative: A Geneva-based global non-profit organisation committed to delivering at least 13 life-saving new treatments – including at least 7 new chemical entities – for people affected by sleeping sickness, leishmaniasis, Chagas disease, river blindness, mycetoma, and dengue fever.
5. Effect Hope and Canadian Network for Neglected Tropical Diseases: The Canadian global health organisations have committed to supporting people affected by neglected tropical diseases, especially focussing on leprosy.
6. Eisai: The Japanese pharmaceutical company will supply free-of-cost its diethylcarbamazine tablets for lymphatic filariasis treatment until the disease is eradicated.
7. Gilead Sciences: The American biopharmaceutical company will provides its drugs for visceral leishmaniasis between 2023 and 2027.
8. Johnson & Johnson: An American multinational medical and consumer packaged goods manufacturer will donate up to 200 million doses of mebendazole annually for soil-transmitted helminthiasis, through 2025. It will also enhance research and development of new drugs for leprosy and dengue.
9. Lepra: The UK-based charity body declared that it "will support people affected by leprosy through prevention, diagnosis, disability aids, and mental health support... [and help] access to reconstructive surgery, multi-drug therapy, eye care and physiotherapy." It will also target lymphatic filariasis.
