= Smallpox virus retention debate =

Debate about the future of smallpox samples

The smallpox virus retention debate has been going on among scientists and health officials since the smallpox virus was declared eradicated by the World Health Organization (WHO) in 1980. The debate centers on whether the last two known remnants of the Variola virus known to cause smallpox, which are kept in tightly controlled government laboratories in the United States and Russia, should be finally and irreversibly destroyed. Advocates of final destruction maintain that there is no longer any valid rationale for retaining the samples, which pose the hazard of escaping the laboratories, while opponents of destruction maintain that the samples may still be of value to scientific research, especially since variants of the smallpox virus may still exist in the natural world and thus present the possibility of the disease re-emerging in the future or being used as a bio-weapon.

== Background ==
In 1981, the four countries that either served as a WHO collaborating center or were actively working with variola virus were the United States, the United Kingdom, the Soviet Union, and South Africa. The last cases of smallpox occurred in an outbreak of two cases, one of which was fatal, in Birmingham, United Kingdom, in 1978. A medical photographer, Janet Parker, contracted the disease at the University of Birmingham Medical School and died on September 11, 1978. In light of this incident, all known stocks of the smallpox virus were destroyed or transferred to one of two World Health Organization reference laboratories which had BSL-4 facilities—the Centers for Disease Control and Prevention (CDC) in the United States and the State Research Center of Virology and Biotechnology VECTOR in Koltsovo, Soviet Union. Since 1984, only these two labs have been authorized by the WHO to hold stocks of live smallpox virus.

In 1986, the WHO first recommended destruction of all smallpox samples, and later set the date of destruction to be 30 December 1993. This was postponed to 30 June 1999, then again to 30 June 2002. Due to resistance from the U.S. and Russia, in 2002 the World Health Assembly agreed to permit temporary retention of the virus stocks for specific research purposes. Destroying existing stocks would reduce the risk involved with ongoing smallpox research; the stocks are not needed to respond to a smallpox outbreak. Some scientists have argued that the stocks may be useful in developing new vaccines, antiviral drugs, and diagnostic tests. A 2010 review by a team of public health experts appointed by the WHO, however, concluded that no essential public health purpose is served by the American and Russian laboratories continuing to retain live virus stocks. The latter view is frequently supported in the scientific community, particularly among veterans of the WHO Smallpox Eradication Program (1958–1979).

== History ==
=== Ad Hoc Committee on Orthopox Infections ===
An Ad Hoc Committee on Orthopox Infections, advising the WHO, has debated the fate of the remaining samples of smallpox in the remaining two official repositories since 1980. Smallpox expert D. A. Henderson has been foremost in favor of destruction, while U.S. Army scientist Peter Jahrling has argued against it on the basis that further research is needed, since he believes that smallpox almost certainly exists outside of the repositories. Other scientists have expressed similar opinions.

=== U.S. pro-retention argument (2011) ===
In 2011, Kathleen Sebelius, secretary of the U.S. Department of Health and Human Services, laid out the rationale of the administration of President Barack Obama in a New York Times op-ed piece. She said, in part:

The global public health community assumes that all nations acted in good faith; however, no one has ever attempted to verify or validate compliance with the WHO request.... Although keeping the samples may carry a minuscule risk, both the United States and Russia believe the dangers of destroying them now are far greater.... It is quite possible that undisclosed or forgotten stocks exist. Also, 30 years after the disease was eradicated, the virus' genomic information is available online and the technology now exists for someone with the right tools and the wrong intentions to create a new smallpox virus in a laboratory.... Destroying the virus now is merely a symbolic act that would slow our progress and could even stop it completely, leaving the world vulnerable.... Destruction of the last securely stored viruses is an irrevocable action that should occur only when the global community has eliminated the threat of smallpox once and for all. To do any less keeps future generations at risk from the re-emergence of one of the deadliest diseases humanity has ever known. Until this research is complete, we cannot afford to take that risk.

=== Post-1984 discovery instances ===
In 2013, cloned variola major (smallpox) DNA fragments were found in a South African laboratory. The WHO arranged to oversee their destruction, which took place in January 2014.

On July 1, 2014, the U.S. National Institutes of Health (NIH) notified the regulatory agency, the Division of Select Agents and Toxins (DSAT) of the CDC, that employees had discovered vials labeled "variola" in an unused portion of a storage room in a U.S. Food and Drug Administration (FDA) laboratory located on the NIH Bethesda campus. In a media statement made seven days later, the CDC confirmed that variola major had been found and it had been transferred to a BSL-4 laboratory at the CDC in Atlanta. Overnight PCR testing had shown the vials did contain variola major. The vials were believed to have been from the 1950s. Further testing showed that the vials contained viable (live) variola major virus. As of the end of 2014, the vials were placed in a secure freezer to await destruction. The protocol for destruction of variola major virus involves a member of the WHO being present at the destruction. Usually the observer watches via closed-circuit television outside the room where the variola virus is autoclaved to destroy it. As a result of the Ebola outbreak in parts of Africa around the same time, the WHO were overstretched and stated they had no one locally with sufficient security clearance to enter a BSL-4 laboratory. Due to this, the WHO were planning to fly an official into Atlanta to oversee the destruction at a future date. The vials were finally destroyed on February 24, 2015, under the supervision of WHO officials.

=== WHO 2018 position ===
As of May 2018, based on the latest (19th) meeting of the WHO Advisory Committee on Variola Virus Research (1–2 November 2017), the question remained as to whether the use of live variola virus for their further development was "essential for public health."

=== 2019 lab explosion ===
In September 2019, the Russian lab housing smallpox samples experienced a gas explosion that injured one worker. It did not occur near the virus storage area, and no samples were compromised, but the incident prompted a review of risks to containment.

=== 2021 discovery false alarm ===
In November 2021, the CDC announced that several frozen vials labeled "Smallpox" were discovered in a freezer in a Merck & Co. vaccine research facility at Montgomery County, Pennsylvania. The vials were determined to contain the vaccinia virus, used in making the vaccine, not the variola virus, which causes smallpox.
