= Zero-risk bias =

Cognitive bias

Zero-risk bias is a tendency to prefer the complete elimination of risk in a sub-part over alternatives with greater overall risk reduction. It often manifests in cases where decision makers address problems concerning health, safety, and the environment. Its effect on decision making has been observed in surveys presenting hypothetical scenarios.

== Explanation ==
Zero-risk bias is based on the way people feel better if a risk is eliminated instead of being merely mitigated. Scientists identified a zero-risk bias in responses to a questionnaire about a hypothetical cleanup scenario involving two hazardous sites X and Y, with X causing 8 cases of cancer annually and Y causing 4 cases annually. The respondents ranked three cleanup approaches: two options each reduced the total number of cancer cases by 6, while the third reduced the number by 5 while eliminating the cases at site Y. While the latter option featured the worst reduction overall, 42% of the respondents ranked it better than at least one of the other options. This conclusion resembled one from an earlier economics study that found people were willing to pay high costs to eliminate a risk. It has a normative justification since once risk is eliminated, people would have less to worry about and such removal of worry also has utility. It is also driven by our preference for winning much more than losing as well as the old instead of the new way, all of which cloud the way the world is viewed.

Multiple real-world policies have been said to be affected by this bias. In American federal policy, the Delaney clause outlawing cancer-causing additives from foods (regardless of actual risk) and the desire for perfect cleanup of Superfund sites have been alleged to be overly focused on complete elimination. Furthermore, the effort needed to implement zero-risk laws grew as technological advances enabled the detection of smaller quantities of hazardous substances. Limited resources were increasingly being devoted to low-risk issues.

Critics of the zero-risk bias model cite that it has the tendency to neglect overall risk reduction. For instance, when eliminating two side effects, it holds that the complete eradication of just one side-effect is preferable to lowering the overall risk.

== Causes ==
Other biases might underlie the zero-risk bias. One is a tendency to think in terms of proportions rather than differences. A greater reduction in proportion of deaths is valued higher than a greater reduction in actual deaths. The zero-risk bias could then be seen as the extreme end of a broad bias about quantities as applied to risk. Framing effects can enhance the bias, for example, by emphasizing a large proportion in a small set, or can attempt to mitigate the bias by emphasizing total quantities.

== See also ==
- Disease eradication
