= World NTD Day =

Awareness day for addressing neglected tropical diseases (NTDs)

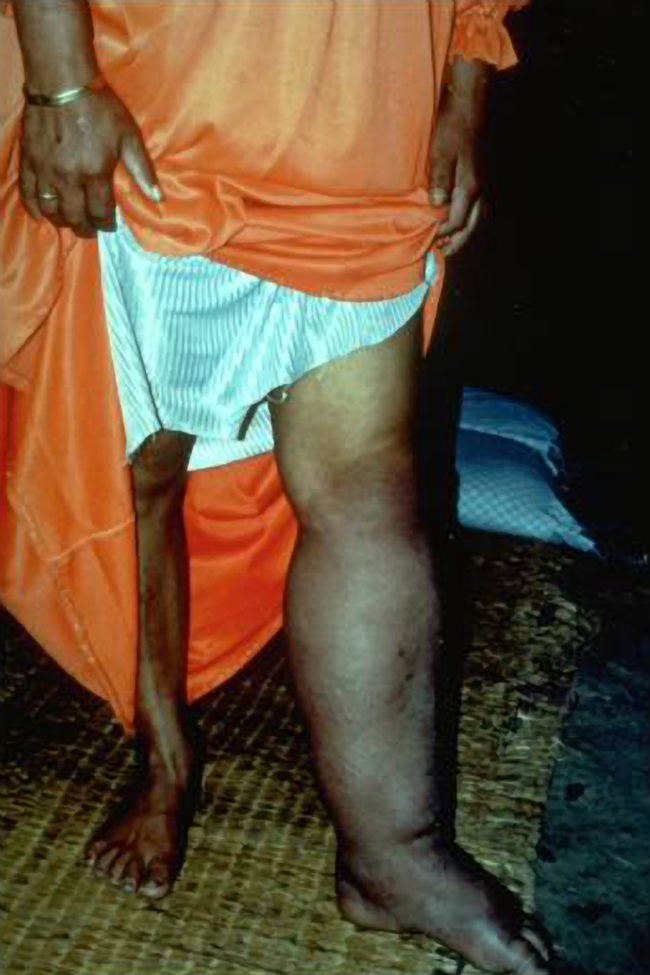
Over a billion people are at risk for infection by filarial nematodes, parasites that cause elephantiasis

World NTD Day or World NTD (Neglected Tropical Diseases) Day is an awareness day for addressing neglected tropical diseases (NTDs). It is held on January 30 annually.

== History ==
The first World NTD Day was on January 30, 2020.

January 30 is the anniversary of the landmark 2012 London Declaration on NTDs, which unified partners across sectors, countries and disease communities to push for greater investment and action on NTDs.

2020 was a special year for the global health response to NTDs, with WHO announcing new goals during the year to guide progress against NTDs until 2030.

Reem Al Hashimi announced the event on behalf of the government of the United Arab Emirates (UAE) on November 19, 2019, at the Reach the Last Mile Forum. The UAE has invested significant sums in efforts to fight NTDs.

On the third World NTD Day in 2022, the Kigali Declaration on Neglected Tropical Diseases, a successor project of the London Declaration, was announced, and was officially launched by Paul Kagame, President of the Republic of Rwanda, at the Kigali Summit on Malaria and NTDs.

== Events ==
On 30 January, Kenya marked World Neglected Tropical Diseases Day with a national event at KCB Grounds in Kajiado County, attended by government officials, health professionals, and partners. Health Cabinet Secretary Aden Duale reaffirmed the country's commitment to eliminating NTDs through cross-border collaborations with Tanzania, mass drug administration, and community-centered interventions.
