= Global Programme to Eliminate Lymphatic Filariasis =

The Global Programme to Eliminate Lymphatic Filariasis (GPELF) is a World Health Organization project to eradicate the Filarioidea worms which cause the disease lymphatic filariasis and also treat the people who already have the infection.

The GPELF is a partnership organization in which countries establish a national LF elimination program, various international sponsors fund the programs, regional pharmaceutical companies produce medicine, universities assist with monitoring, and the WHO convenes international conversation.

A study examined the first 8 years of the organization's programs and reported that they were generally successful and that the elimination plan was a good investment for participating countries. A study review 13 years into the program found that the programs were reducing the disease, but not as quickly as planned, and that there would need to be changes to meet the goal of eliminating the disease by 2020.

As an elimination strategy, the organization recommends mass drug administration to at least 65% of the population in areas with an infection rate of 1% or more.

China participated in the program and became LF free in 2007.
