= Temefos =

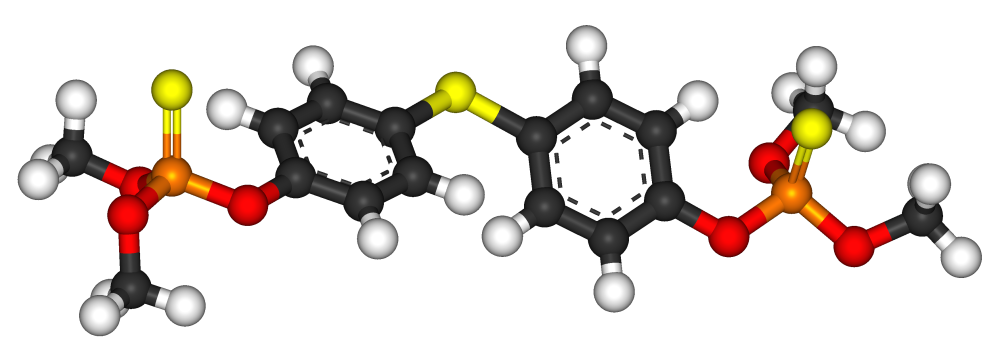

Names
- Preferred IUPAC name O-[4-({4-[(Dimethoxyphosphorothioyl)oxy]phenyl}sulfanyl)phenyl] O,O-dimethyl phosphorothioate
- Other names [4-(4-dimethoxyphosphinothioyloxyphenyl)sulfanylphenoxy]- dimethoxy-sulfanylidene-phosphorane

Identifiers
CAS Number	3383-96-8
3D model (JSmol)	Interactive image
ChEBI	CHEBI:38954
ChEMBL	ChEMBL1355821
ChemSpider	5199
ECHA InfoCard	100.020.175
KEGG	D06062
MeSH	Temefos
PubChem CID	5392
UNII	ONP3ME32DL
CompTox Dashboard (EPA)	DTXSID1032484
- InChI: InChI=1S/C16H20O6P2S3/c1-17-23(25,18-2)21-13-5-9-15(10-6-13)27-16-11-7-14(8-12-16)22-24(26,19-3)20-4/h5-12H,1-4H3 Key: WWJZWCUNLNYYAU-UHFFFAOYSA-N; InChI=1/C16H20O6P2S3/c1-17-23(25,18-2)21-13-5-9-15(10-6-13)27-16-11-7-14(8-12-16)22-24(26,19-3)20-4/h5-12H,1-4H3 Key: WWJZWCUNLNYYAU-UHFFFAOYAC
- SMILES: S=P(OC)(OC)Oc2ccc(Sc1ccc(OP(=S)(OC)OC)cc1)cc2

Properties
Chemical formula	C_{16}H_{20}O_{6}P_{2}S_{3}
Molar mass	466.46 g·mol^{−1}
Appearance	white, crystalline solid
Density	1.32 g cm^{−3}
Melting point	30 °C (86 °F; 303 K)
Boiling point	120–125 °C (248–257 °F; 393–398 K) (decomposes)
Solubility in water	insoluble
Vapor pressure	0.00000007 mmHg (20°C)

Hazards
- NIOSH (US health exposure limits)
PEL (Permissible)	15 mg/m^{3}
REL (Recommended)	TWA 10 mg/m^{3} (total) TWA 5 mg/m^{3} (resp)
IDLH (Immediate danger)	N.D.
- Except where otherwise noted, data are given for materials in their standard state (at 25 °C [77 °F], 100 kPa). verify (what is ?) Infobox references

Temefos or temephos (trade name Abate) is an organophosphate larvicide used to treat water infested with disease-carrying insects (including mosquitoes, midges, and black fly larvae) and crustaceans (copepods).

== Synthesis and Preparation ==
Temephos can be synthesized by reacting 4,4′-thiodiphenol with dimethoxythiophosphonyl chloride.

== Properties ==
Temephos is a flammable, colorless (white) solid that is practically insoluble in water. It undergoes hydrolysis in strongly acidic and alkaline conditions.

=== Mode of action ===
Its mode of action involves the inhibition of acetylcholinesterase. As with other organophosphates, temephos affects the central nervous system through inhibition of cholinesterase. In larvae, this results in death before reaching the adult stage.

== Uses ==
Temephos is used as an insecticide. It is used to control mosquito and sand fly larvae in bodies of water not used for drinking water production. Approximately 25,000 to 40,000 pounds are used annually in the United States.

In the developing world where the vector-borne disease dengue fever is endemic, temephos is widely used and applied by both private and public pest control in areas of standing water where the Aedes aegypti mosquito breeds, in order to reduce the population of this disease-carrying insect. Temephos is also used in the Guinea Worm Eradication Program to kill the copepods that carry guinea worm larvae.

Resistance to temephos by A. aegypti has been seen in Brazil. The Brazilian Aedes aegypti resistance monitoring program detected temephos resistance in A. aegypti populations from several localities in the country in 1999 (Funasa 2000, Lima et al. 2003). In 1999, mosquitoes from the city of Rio de Janeiro were observed to be resistant to temephos.

== Registration ==
Temephos is not approved as an active ingredient in pesticides in the European Union; consequently, no pesticides containing this active ingredient are commercially available in Germany, Austria, or Switzerland.

== Bibliography ==
- Dejous C & Elouard J.M (1977) Action de l'abate sur les invertébérs aquatiques; cinétique de décrochement à court et moyen terme (in French).
