= Eradication of lymphatic filariasis =

Public health intervention

The eradication of lymphatic filariasis is the ongoing attempt to eliminate lymphatic filariasis (LF) as a public health problem by reducing the prevalence of infection in endemic countries to the point which transmission of the infection can no longer be sustained. This effort is being made by organizations such as the World Health Organization (WHO), the Gates Foundation, the END Fund, pharmaceutical companies such as GSK, Merck, and Eisai, and the international community.

In 1997, the World Health Assembly called for the elimination of LF, as it was identified as one of only six infectious diseases to be "potentially eradicable" due to advancements in its diagnosis and treatment. In 2000, the WHO established the Global Programme to Eliminate Lymphatic Filariasis (GPELF). This international effort had the goal of having mass drug administration (MDA) programs in every endemic country to eliminate the disease globally by 2020. The GPELF has since revised this goal to having all endemic countries conducting post MDA surveillance by 2030 and for 80% of these countries to have achieved elimination. GPELF is supported by and not to be confused with Global Alliance to Eliminate Lymphatic Filariasis (GAELF), a partnership of governments, NGOs, and other groups working to eliminate LF.

== Eradication plan ==
The disease spreads when a mosquito transfers a worm parasite through mosquito bite. In various regions the species of worm and mosquito can vary. The prevention and treatment plans differ according to whatever is effective against the species in a given region.

The creation of maps and planning of local monitoring systems has been an essential part of all regional eradication plans.

== By region ==
Countries by mass drug administration for lymphatic filariasis (July 2026) Not started Pending impact survey Ongoing Under surveillance Classified as non-endemic Eliminated as a public health problem

=== Africa ===
A 2018 update for Madagascar reported that many people still tested positive for the parasite.

=== Asia ===
China participated in the program and became LF free in 2007. Prior to that, the disease had been in China since ancient times. In the 1980s China had 30 million people with the disease.

As of 2016 various countries in South East Asia were at different phases in their national elimination programs. Bangladesh, Thailand, Maldives, and Sri Lanka all ended their mass drug administration programs due to success in elimination. India, Indonesia, Nepal, and Myanmar are actively doing MDA.

Thailand took a baseline survey of LF in 2001. From 2002 to 2011 the country did MDA. In September 2017, the World Health Organization declared Thailand to be free of LF.

=== Oceania ===
In the 1970s, there was an eradication experiment in French Polynesia. Samoa and Fiji did experiments in the early 1990s. These practical experiments in eradication became models for LF eradication for the rest of the world to use.

Tonga did MDA from 2001 to 2006. The World Health Organization declared the country free of LF in 2017.

MDA has seen significant success in Papua New Guinea, however factors such as geography and lack of infrastructure have made this process difficult.

=== The Americas ===
Wuchereria bancrofti is the sole parasite which causes LF in the Americas and is transmitted solely by the Culex quinquefasciatus mosquito. It is thought that the parasite was introduced from Africa during the transatlantic slave trade, but the possibility of introduction with the migration of indentured servants from Asia also exists. Historically, the disease was endemic in 24 countries, though there is poorly documented evidence of its presence in 10 other countries.

By the time of the launch of GPELF, only seven countries showed signs of transmission. Costa Rica, Suriname, and Trinidad and Tobago were delisted as endemic countries by WHO in 2011. All three of these nations launched elimination programs in the 1980s or prior. In 2024, Brazil became the twentieth country validated for elimination of lymphatic filariasis as a public health problem by the WHO. Dominican Republic, Guyana, and Haiti are the only three remaining endemic countries in the Americas.

In 2024, 95% of all LF cases in the Americas were on the island of Hispaniola. MDA started in Dominican Republic in December 2002 and ended in 2018. While evidence of a potential resurgence is non-existent, the possibility is ever present so long as transmission continues in neighboring Haiti. When MDA started in Haiti, each of its 140 communes required treatment. By 2024, 87% of Haiti's communes and 65% of its population no longer had to continue with treatment. However, challenges still remain due to various factors including the nation's current crisis.
