= Larvicide =

Insecticide against the larval stage

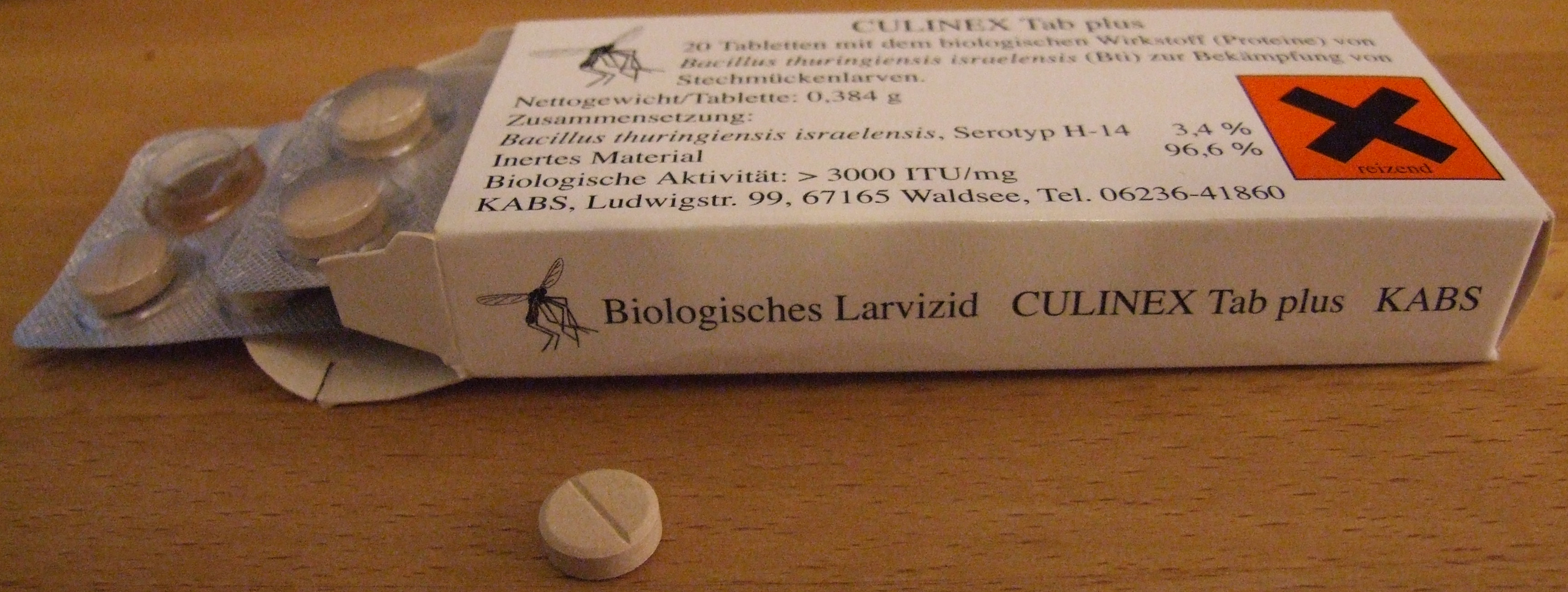
Larvicide CULINEX Tab plus, Bacillus thuringiensis israelensis

A larvicide (alternatively larvacide) is an insecticide that is specifically targeted against the larval life stage of an insect. Their most common use is against mosquitoes. Larvicides may be contact poisons, stomach poisons, growth regulators, or (increasingly) biological control agents.

== Biological agents ==
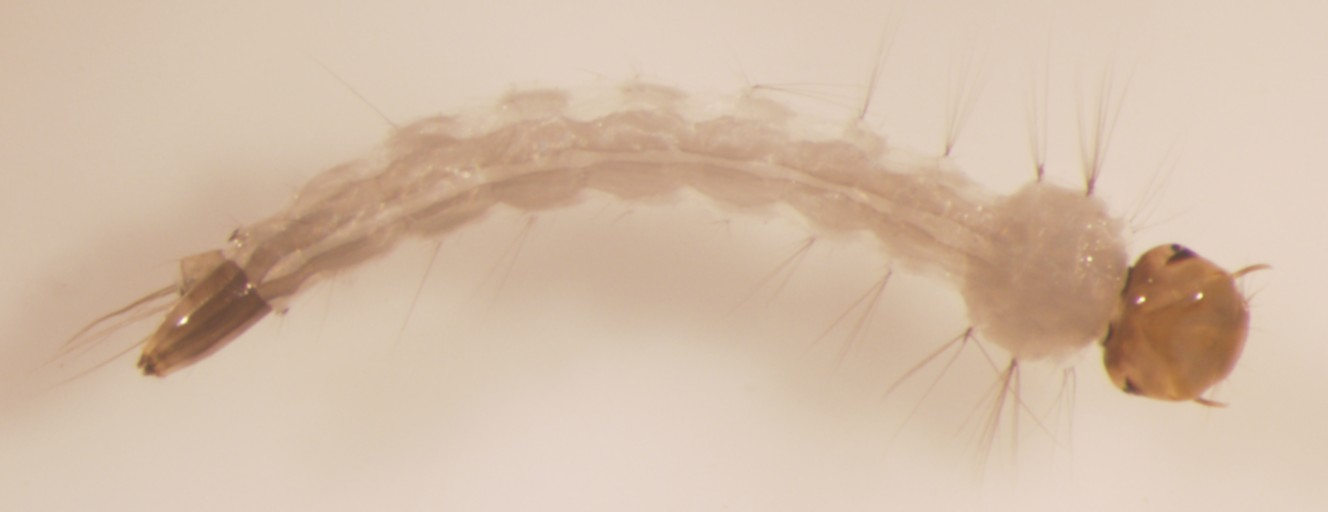
Larva of Aedes aegypti

The biological control agent Bacillus thuringiensis, also known as Bt, is a bacterial disease specific to Lepidopteran caterpillars. Bacillus thuringiensis israelensis, also known as Bti, and Bacillus sphaericus, which affect larval mosquitoes and some midges, have come into increasing use in recent times.

Bti and B. sphaericus are both naturally occurring soil bacteria registered as larvicides under the names Bactivec, Bacticide, Aquabac, Teknar, Vectobac, LarvX, and VectoLex CG. Typically in granular form, pellets are distributed on the surface of stagnant water locations. When the mosquito larvae ingest the bacteria, crystallized toxins are produced that destroy the digestive tract, resulting in death. These larvicides will last only a few weeks in water and pose no danger to humans, non-targeted animal species, or the environment when used according to directions.

== Chemical agents ==
Methoprene is an insect growth regulator agent that interrupts the growth cycle of insect larvae, preventing them from developing beyond the pupa stage. MetaLarv and Altosid are products containing S-methoprene as the active ingredient. They are usually applied to larger bodies of water in the form of time-release formulations that can last from one to five months. Use of this larvicide does not pose an unreasonable health risks to humans or other wildlife, and it will not leach into the ground water supply. Methoprene is moderately toxic to some fish, shrimp, lobster, and crayfish, and highly toxic to some fish and freshwater invertebrates; it bioaccumulates in fish tissues.

Temephos, marketed as Abate and ProVect, is an organophosphate which prevents mosquito larvae from developing resistance to bacterial larvicides. Due to the small amount needed and the fast rate that temephos breaks down in water, this type of larvicide does not pose an unreasonable health risk to humans, but at large doses it can cause nausea or dizziness. Similarly, there is not a large risk to terrestrial species, but there is a toxic concern for non-targeted aquatic species. Therefore, temephos should be limited only to sites where less hazardous larvicides are ineffective and with intervals between applications.

Copper is also known for its larvicidal properties, and has been tested in field settings to determine its effectiveness and practicality for mosquito control.

== Acoustic larvicide ==
Sound energy transmitted into water at specific frequencies cause larvae air bladders to instantly rupture, severely damaging internal tissues causing death or latent effects prohibiting further maturity.

== Other techniques ==
Larviciding techniques can also include the addition of surface films to standing water to suffocate mosquito larvae, or the genetic modification of plants so that they naturally produce a larvicide in plant tissues.

Research on botanical oils has found neem oil to be larvicidal.

Larvicidal activity of neem oil (Azadirachta indica) formulation against mosquitoes. Median lethal concentration (LC50) of the formulation against Anopheles stephensi, Culex quinquefasciatus and Aedes aegypti was found to be 1.6, 1.8 and 1.7 ppm respectively. The formulation also showed 95.1% and 99.7% reduction of Aedes larvae on day 1 and day 2 respectively; thereafter 100% larval control was observed up to day 7.

== See also ==
- Index of pesticide articles
