= Lymphatic filariasis =

- Other names: Elephantiasis tropica, elephantiasis arabum
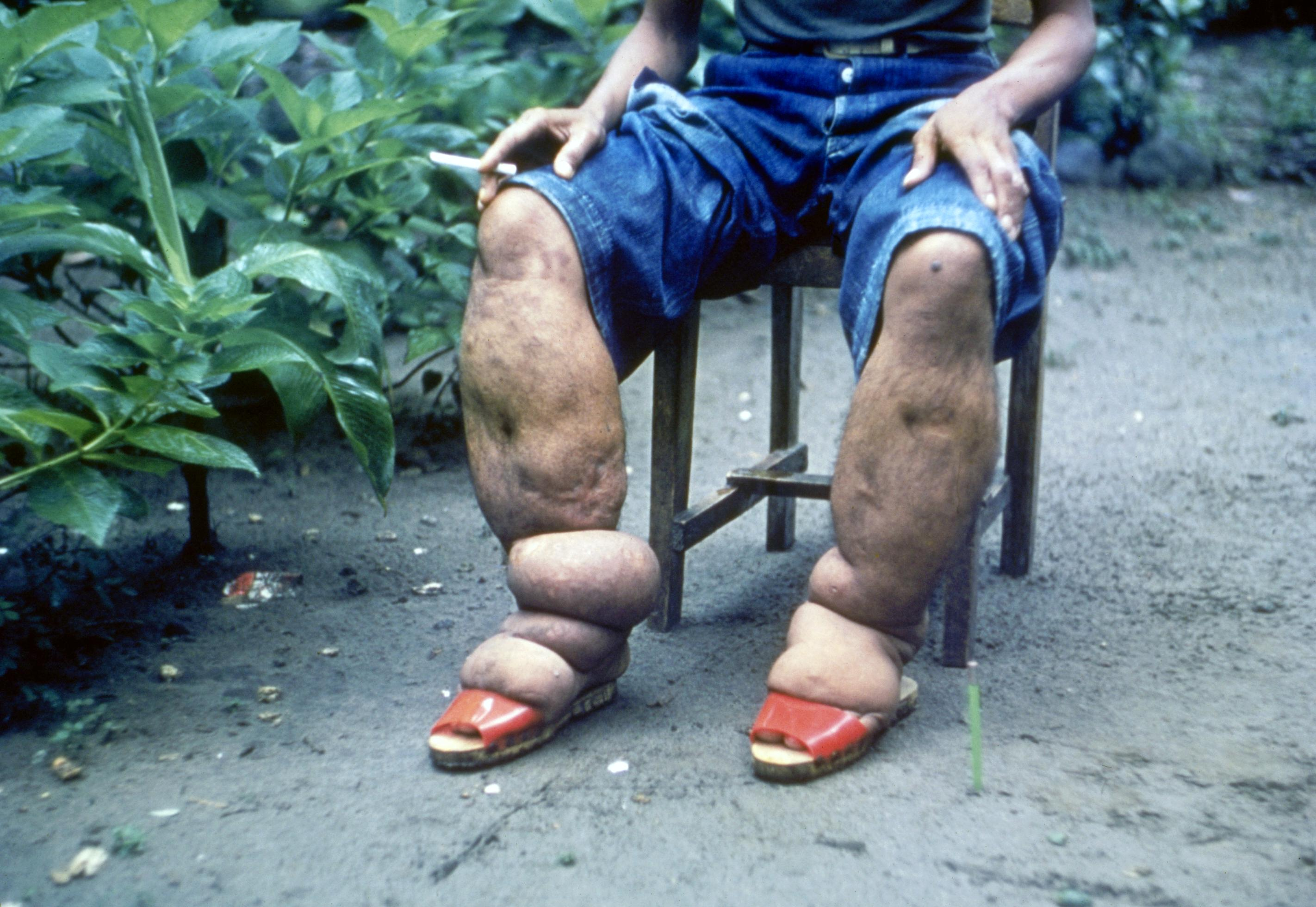
- Elephantiasis of the legs due to filariasis.
- Specialty: Infectious diseases
- Symptoms: None, severe swelling of the arms, legs, breasts, or genitals
- Causes: Filarial worms spread by mosquitos
- Diagnostic method: Microscopic examination of blood
- Prevention: Bed nets, mass deworming
- Medication: Albendazole with ivermectin or diethylcarbamazine
- Frequency: 40 million (2022)

Lymphatic filariasis is a human disease caused by parasitic worms known as filarial worms. Usually acquired in childhood, it is a leading cause of permanent disability worldwide, impacting over a hundred million people and manifesting itself in a variety of severe clinical pathologies. While most cases have no symptoms, some people develop a syndrome called elephantiasis, which is marked by severe swelling in the arms, legs, breasts, or genitals. The skin may become thicker as well, and the condition may become painful. Affected people are often unable to work and are often shunned or rejected by others because of their disfigurement and disability.

It is the first mosquito-borne disease directly linked to mosquitoes. The worms are spread by the bites of infected mosquitoes. Three types of worms are known to cause the disease: Wuchereria bancrofti, Brugia malayi, and Brugia timori, with Wuchereria bancrofti being the most common. These worms damage the lymphatic system by nesting within the lymphatic vessels and disrupting the system's normal function. Worms can survive within the human body for up to 8 years, all while reproducing millions of larvae which circulate through the blood. The disease is diagnosed by microscopic examination of blood collected during the night. The blood is typically examined as a smear after being stained with Giemsa stain. Testing the blood for antibodies against the disease may also permit diagnosis. Other roundworms from the same family are responsible for river blindness.

Prevention can be achieved by treating entire groups affected by the disease, known as mass deworming. This is done every year for about six years, to rid a population of the disease entirely. Medications usually include a combination of two or more anthelmintic agents: albendazole, ivermectin, and diethylcarbamazine. Efforts to prevent mosquito bites are also recommended, including reducing the number of mosquitoes and promoting the use of bed nets.

As of 2022, about 40 million people were infected, and about 863 million people were at risk of the disease in 47 countries. It is most common in tropical Africa and Asia. Lymphatic filariasis is classified as a neglected tropical disease and one of the four main worm infections. The impact of the disease results in economic losses of billions of US dollars a year.

== Signs and symptoms ==
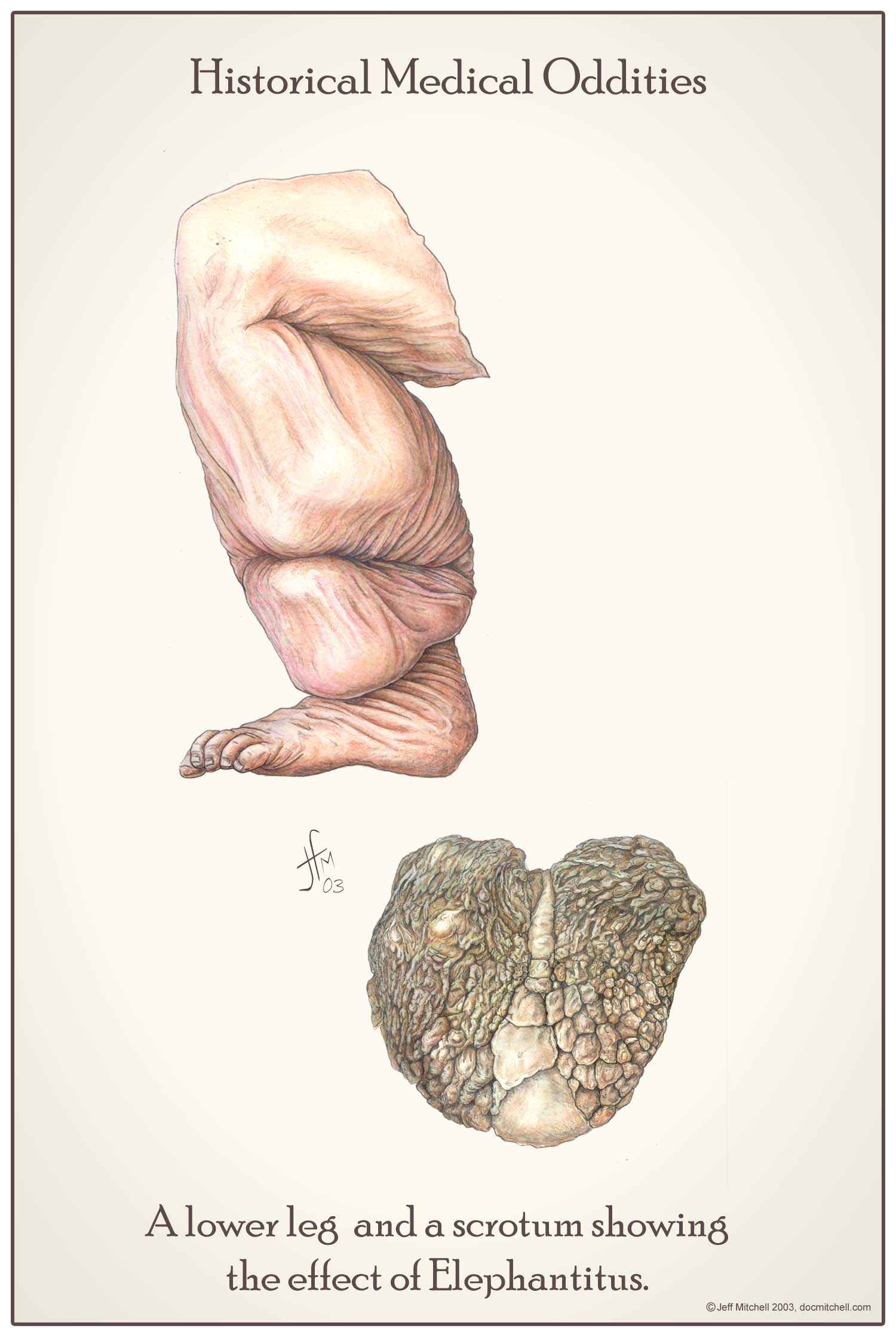
Drawn from the collection at the National Museum of Health and Medicine and shows the effect of elephantiasis in a historic context

Most people infected with the worms that cause lymphatic filariasis never develop symptoms; though some have damage to lymph vessels that can be detected by medical ultrasound. Months to years after the initial infection, the worms die, triggering an immune response that manifests with repeated episodes of fever and painful swelling over the nearest lymph nodes (typically those along the groin). In areas with endemic lymphatic filariasis, people are typically infected in childhood, and symptoms begin in adolescence.

A subset of those affected have continued damage to their lymph vessels. Dysfunctional vessels fail to recirculate lymph fluid, which can pool (called lymphodema) in the nearest extremity – generally the arm, leg, breast, or scrotum. Loss of lymph function (which transports immune cells) results in various repeated infections in the area. Repeated cycles of infection, inflammation, and lymph vessel damage over several years cause the affected extremity to swell to an extremely large size. The surrounding skin thickens, becoming dry, discolored, and dotted with wartlike lumps that contain tortuous loops of lymph vessels.

Even those without lymph damage can sometimes develop an allergic reaction to the worm larvae in the capillaries of the lung, called tropical pulmonary eosinophilia. These people develop nocturnal coughing, fatigue, and weight loss. Over time, this can damage the lungs, resulting in restrictive lung disease (decreased lung capacity).

== Causes ==
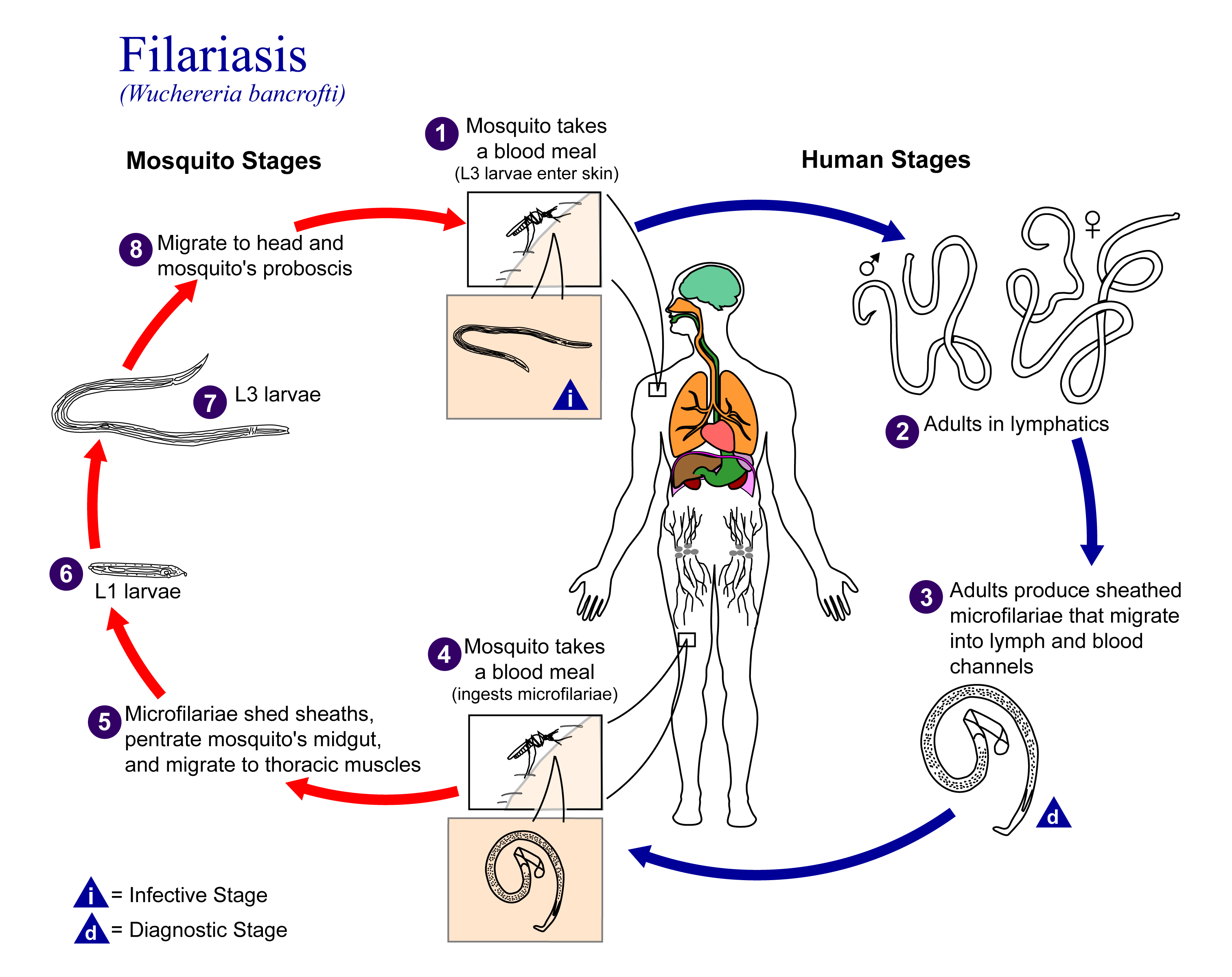
Life cycle of Wuchereria bancrofti, a parasite that causes lymphatic filariasis

Lymphatic filariasis is caused by infection with three different nematode worms: Wuchereria bancrofti (causes 90% of cases), Brugia malayi, and Brugia timori. The three worms are transmitted by the bite of an infected mosquito – largely of genera Aedes, Anopheles, Culex, or Mansonia. When the mosquito bites, infectious nematode larvae are dropped onto the skin. They crawl into the bite wound, through the subcutaneous tissue, and into nearby lymph vessels. There, they develop into adults over about a year, with adult females up to 10 centimetres (3.9 in) long, and males up to half that length. Adult females and males mate, prompting the female to begin releasing a constant stream of larvae called "microfilariae" – more than 10,000 microfilariae each day for the adult's remaining lifespan of around five to eight years. Microfilariae typically circulate in the blood stream at night; during the day they collect in the capillaries of the lungs.

A mosquito that feeds on an infected person can take up microfilariae along with its blood meal. Inside the mosquito, the microfilariae pierce the stomach wall and crawl to the flight muscles, where they mature over 10 to 20 days into their human-infectious form. They then crawl to the mosquito's mouth to be deposited at its next bite, continuing the lifecycle.

The disease itself is a result of a complex interplay between several factors: the worm, the endosymbiotic Wolbachia bacteria within the worm, the host's immune response, and the numerous opportunistic infections and disorders that arise. The adult worms live in the human lymphatic system and obstruct the flow of lymph throughout the body; this results in chronic lymphedema, most often noted in the lower torso (typically in the legs and genitals). These worms can survive within the human body for up to 8 years, all the while reproducing millions of larvae which circulate through the blood.

== Diagnosis ==
The preferred method for diagnosing lymphatic filariasis is by finding the microfilariae via microscopic examination of the blood. The blood sample is typically in the form of a thick smear, stained with Giemsa stain. Technicians analyzing the blood smear must be able to distinguish between W. bancrofti and other parasites potentially present. A blood smear is a simple and fairly accurate diagnostic tool, provided the blood sample is taken when the microfilariae are in the peripheral circulation. Because the microfilariae only circulate in the blood at night, the blood specimen must be collected at night.

It is often difficult or impossible to detect the causative organism in the peripheral blood, even in advanced cases. In such cases, testing the blood serum for antibodies against the disease may also be used. A polymerase chain reaction test can also be performed to detect a minute fraction, as little as 1 pg, of filarial DNA. Dead, calcified worms can be detected by X-ray examinations. Ultrasonography can also be used to detect the movements and noises caused by the movement of adult worms.

=== Differential diagnosis ===
Lymphatic filariasis may be confused with podoconiosis (also known as nonfilarial elephantiasis), a non-infectious disease caused by exposure of bare feet to irritant alkaline clay soils. Podoconiosis however typically affects the legs bilaterally, while filariasis is generally unilateral. Also, podoconiosis very rarely affects the groin while filariasis frequently involves the groin. Geographical location may also help to distinguish between these two diseases: podoconiosis is typically found in higher altitude areas with high seasonal rainfall, while filariasis is common in low-lying areas where mosquitos are prevalent.

== Prevention ==
Protecting against mosquito bites in endemic regions is crucial to the prevention of lymphatic filariasis. Insect repellents and mosquito nets (especially when treated with an insecticide such as deltamethrin or permethrin) have been demonstrated to reduce the transmission of lymphatic filariasis. In addition residual spraying and personal protective equipment are known ways to control vectors.

Worldwide eradication of lymphatic filariasis is the definitive goal. This is considered to be achievable since the disease has no known animal reservoir. The World Health Organization (WHO) is coordinating the global effort to eradicate filariasis. The mainstay of this program is mass deworming of entire populations of people who are at risk with antifilarial drugs. The specific treatment depends on the co-endemicity of lymphatic filariasis with other filarial diseases. The WHO's annual MDA guidelines are listed below.

- For areas co-endemic with loiasis 400 mg of albendazole should be administered
- for countries co-endemic with onchocerciasis, 200 mcg/kg of Ivermectin should be administered with 400 mg of albendazole
- in countries without onchocerciasis 6 mg/kg of diethylcarbamazine citrate (DEC) and 400 mg of albendazole should be used
- in countries without onchocerciasis and the IDA Guidelines are met 200 mcg/kg of ivermectin should be used with 6 mg/kg of diethylcarbamazine and 400 mg of albendazole.

Because the parasite requires a human host to reproduce, consistent treatment of at-risk populations (annually for a duration of four to six years) is expected to break the cycle of transmission and cause the extinction of the causative organisms.

In 2011, Sri Lanka was certified by the WHO as having eradicated lymphatic filariasis. In July 2017, the WHO announced that the disease had been eliminated in Tonga. Elimination of the disease has also occurred in Cambodia, China, Cook Islands, Egypt, Kiribati, Maldives, Marshall Islands, Niue, Palau, South Korea, Thailand, Vanuatu, Vietnam, and Wallis and Futuna. In 2020, the WHO announced 2030 targets for this program of eliminating lymphatic filariasis in 80% of endemic countries.

A vaccine is not yet available, but in 2013, the University of Illinois College of Medicine was reporting 95% efficacy in testing against B. malayi in mice.

== Treatment ==
Lymphatic filariasis treatment coverage

Countries by mass drug administration for lymphatic filariasis (July 2026) Not started Pending impact survey Ongoing Under surveillance Classified as non-endemic Eliminated as a public health problem

Treatment of lymphatic filariasis depends in part on the geographic location of the area of the world in which the disease was acquired but often involves the combination of two or more anthelmintic agents: albendazole, ivermectin, and diethylcarbamazine. In sub-Saharan Africa, the disease is usually treated with albendazole and ivermectin, whereas in the Western Pacific region, all three anthelmintic agents are used. While diethylcarbamazine in combination with albendazole is often used, it isn't as region-specific as the other combinations. Albendazole monotherapy is used in regions with endemic loiasis in combination with integrated vector control and was the treatment modality for 11.2 million people in 2022.

Wolbachia are endosymbiotic bacteria that live inside the gut of the nematode worms responsible for lymphatic filariasis, and which provide nutrients necessary for their survival. Doxycycline kills these bacteria, which in turn prevents the maturation of microfilariae into adults. It also shortens the lifespan of the adult worms, causing them to die within 1 to 2 years instead of their normal 10 to 14-year lifespan. Doxycycline is effective in treating lymphatic filariasis. Limitations of this antibiotic protocol include that it requires 4 to 6 weeks of treatment rather than the single dose of the anthelmintic agents, that doxycycline should not be used in young children and pregnant women, and that it is phototoxic.

Albendazole is classified as an antihelmintic, which specifically works to kill worms. The drug stops the worms from absorbing glucose, evidently leading to starvation and death from fatigue. The effects of albendazole alone have varying results, however, in combination with DEC drugs it has been found more effective. Ivermectin is administered with albendazole, and works by binding to the nerve cells of the parasites, subsequently making them permeable to chloride. This leads to death by paralysis for the worms. Ivermectin, however, has been found to only kill the parasites in their early stages of life, and cannot kill an adult, live worm. Therefore, this drug is usually combined with diethylcarbamazine (DEC) to kill both the microfilariae and the adult worms.

Surgical treatment may be helpful in cases of scrotal elephantiasis and hydrocele. However, surgery is generally ineffective at correcting elephantiasis of the limbs. Acute inflammatory responses due to lymphedema, and hydrocele can be reduced or prevented by practicing good hygiene, skin care, exercise and elevation of infected limbs.

== Epidemiology ==
Number of people with lymphatic filariasis

Lymphatic filariasis occurs in tropical and subtropical regions of Africa, Asia, Central America, the Caribbean, South America, and certain Pacific Island nations. Elephantiasis caused by lymphatic filariasis is one of the most common causes of permanent disability in the world. As of 2018, 51 million people were infected with lymphatic filariasis and at least 863 million people in 50 countries were living in areas that require preventive chemotherapy to stop the spread of infection. By 2022, the prevalence had declined to somewhere around 40 million and the disease remains endemic in 47 countries. These improvements are a direct result of the WHO's Global Programme to Eliminate Lymphatic Filariasis. Since implementation, 740 million people no longer require preventative chemotherapy to treat the disease.

W. bancrofti is responsible for 90% of lymphatic filariasis. Brugia malayi causes most of the remainder of the cases, while Brugia timori is a rare cause. W. bancrofti largely affects areas across the broad equatorial belt (Africa, the Nile Delta, Turkey, India, the East Indies, Southeast Asia, Philippines, Oceanic Islands, and parts of South America). Since lymphatic filariasis requires multiple mosquito bites over several months to years to spread, the transmission of infection due to tourism is low. The mosquito vectors of W. bancrofti have a preference for human blood; humans are the only animals naturally infected with W. bancrofti. No reservoir host is known.

In South America, three endemic countries, the Dominican Republic, Guyana, and Haiti, have been working to eliminate lymphatic filariasis, and a fourth, Brazil, successfully eliminated it in 2024. In Latin America, lymphatic filariasis is caused by W. bancrofti and spread mainly by the mosquito Culex quinquefasciatus. The exponential rate of development within the Americas is being combated through the development of a mass drug administration (MDA) program. This 3-step drug administration program has led to a 67% decrease in the need for the drug program. Brazil targeted the rising endemic by administering diethylcarbamazine (DEC) drugs through an MDA program to the communities hit hardest by the disease. By providing these drugs annually, as well as offering post-care, through showing family members how to treat the disease, creating connections for jobs, as well as providing a social network to incorporate patients into society, Brazil has made the most effort to provide care. The Dominican Republic has administered 5 rounds of DEC drugs annually for five years, spanning from 2002-2007. After the initial drastic action, the Dominican Republic then administered another three rounds of MDA. Guyana also used DEC drugs to focus on preventing the spread of the disease, using a DEC-fortified salt from 2003-2007 and ultimately switching to MDA with DEC from 2014 to the present, targeting patient education and access to treatment. Haiti then focused on the disease by implementing DEC treatment in 2002. It reached full geographical coverage by 2012; subsequently, in 2014, about 20 communities had eradicated the need for MDA.

In communities where lymphatic filariasis is endemic, as many as 10% of women can be affected by swollen limbs, and 50% of men can develop mutilating genital symptoms.

== History ==
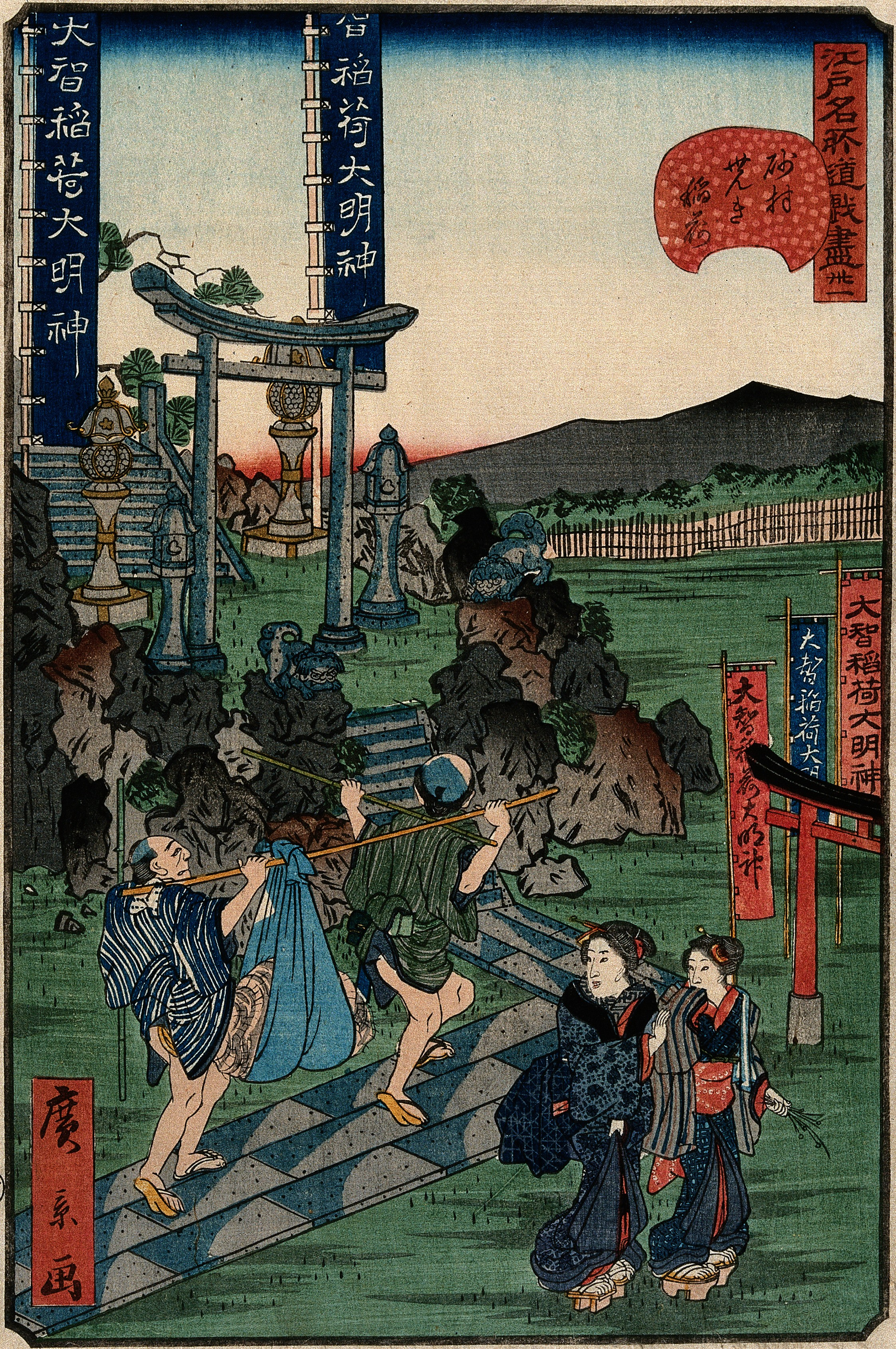
A man in Japan is helped to carry his enlarged scrotum

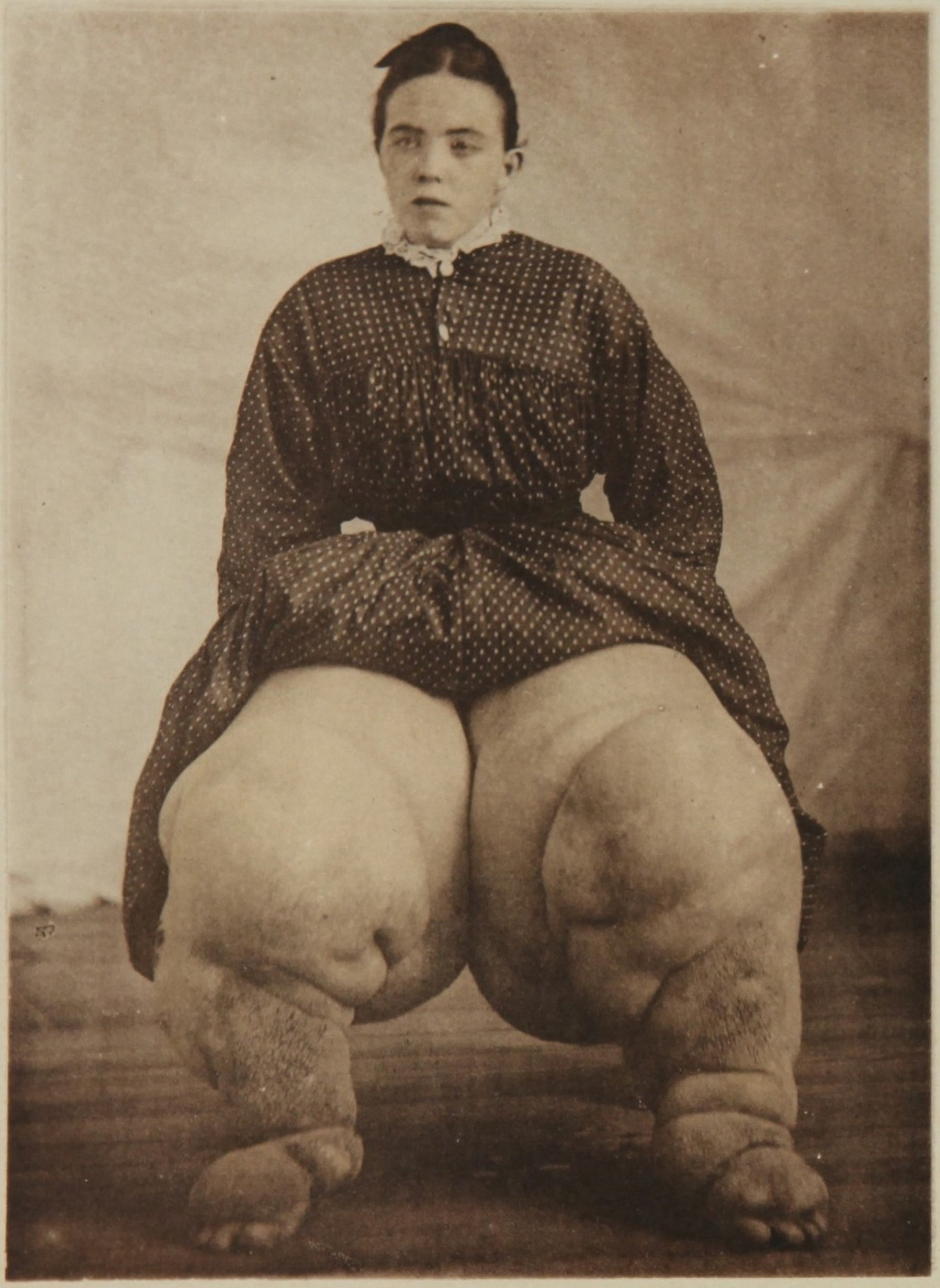
19-year-old woman with elephantiasis, c. 1878

There is evidence of Lymphatic filariasis cases dating back 4000 years. The ancient Vedic text, the Rig Veda, composed around 1500 BC–1200 BC, makes a possible reference to elephantiasis. The 50th hymn of the 7th book of the Rigveda calls on the gods Mitra, Varuna, and Agni for protection against "that which nests inside and swells". The author of the hymn implores the deities to not let the worm wound his foot. The disease is described as causing eruptions to appear on the ankles and the knees. Artifacts from ancient Egypt (2000 BC) and the Nok civilization in West Africa (500 BC) show possible elephantiasis symptoms. The first clear reference to the disease occurs in ancient Greek literature, wherein scholars differentiated the often similar symptoms of lymphatic filariasis from those of leprosy, describing leprosy as elephantiasis graecorum and lymphatic filariasis as elephantiasis arabum.

The first documentation of symptoms occurred in the 16th century, when Jan Huyghen van Linschoten wrote about the disease during the exploration of Goa. Similar symptoms were reported by subsequent explorers in areas of Asia and Africa, though an understanding of the disease did not begin to develop until centuries later.

The causative agents were first identified in the late 19th century. In 1866, Timothy Lewis, building on the work of Jean Nicolas Demarquay and Otto Henry Wucherer, made the connection between microfilariae and elephantiasis, establishing the course of research that would ultimately explain the disease. In 1876, Joseph Bancroft discovered the adult form of the worm. In 1877, the lifecycle involving an arthropod vector was theorized by Patrick Manson, who proceeded to demonstrate the presence of the worms in mosquitoes. Manson incorrectly hypothesized that the disease was transmitted through skin contact with water in which the mosquitoes had laid eggs. In 1900, George Carmichael Low determined the actual transmission method by discovering the presence of the worm in the proboscis of the mosquito vector.

Many people in Malabar, Nayars as well as Brahmans and their wives – in fact about a quarter or a fifth of the total population, including the people of the lowest castes – have very large legs, swollen to a great size; and they die of this, and it is an ugly thing to see. They say that this is due to the water through which they go, because the country is marshy. This is called pericaes in the native language, and all the swelling is the same from the knees downward, and they have no pain, nor do they take any notice of this infirmity.

— Portuguese diplomat Tomé Pires, Suma Oriental, 1512–1515.

== Research directions ==
Researchers at the University of Illinois at Chicago (UIC) have developed a novel vaccine for the prevention of lymphatic filariasis. This vaccine has been shown to elicit strong, protective immune responses in mouse and non-human primate models of lymphatic filariasis infection. The immune response elicited by this vaccine has been demonstrated to be protective against both W. bancrofti and B. malayi infection in the mouse model and may prove useful in humans.

On 20 September 2007, geneticists published the first draft of the complete genome (genetic content) of Brugia malayi, one of the roundworms that causes lymphatic filariasis. This project had been started in 1994 and by 2000 80% of the genome had been determined. Determining the content of the genes may lead to the development of new drugs and vaccines.

== Veterinary disease ==
Onchocerca ochengi causes lymphatic filariasis in cattle.
