= Rural Water Supply Network =

- Abbreviation: RWSN
- Formation: 1992; 34 years ago (initially under the name of Handpump Technology Network (HTN), since 2004 under the name of RWSN)
- Type: Non-profit organization
- Purpose: Achieving universal access to safe, affordable drinking water for all rural people worldwide
- Headquarters: St. Gallen, Switzerland (location of secretariat)
- Region served: Worldwide but mainly developing countries
- Method: Networking, capacity building, knowledge sharing, creating and hosting publications, online discussion groups, webinars, conferences
- Funding: Various (formerly Swiss Agency for Development and Cooperation (SDC) was providing core funding); nowadays funding is from partner contributions and project funding
- Website: rural-water-supply.net/en/

The Rural Water Supply Network (RWSN) is a global, multi-stakeholder network focused on achieving universal access to safe, affordable drinking water for all rural people worldwide. Established in 1992 as the Handpump Technology Network (HTN), the organization originally concentrated on the development and maintenance of handpump technologies. Over time, it expanded its scope to address broader rural water supply issues, and in 2004, it was rebranded as RWSN. The network has no legal structure and instead is a loose collaboration.

RWSN operates on the principles of collaboration, knowledge sharing, and capacity building among its members. The network is organized into various thematic groups, such as sustainable groundwater development, self-supply, and the professionalization of community water management. RWSN runs webinars, facilitates online discussion communities and publishes peer-reviewed guidelines and case studies.

Funding for RWSN comes from a combination of membership fees, grants from international donors, and contributions from partner organizations. The RWSN secretariat had income for the period 2018-2020 from 15 sources of partner contributions and project funding. The largest single contribution (30%) was from the Swiss Agency for Development and Cooperation (SDC). The secretariat complements its core funds with project based work.

== Rationale and regional focus ==
The RWSN networking activities focus on rural people most in need of safe access to drinking water, which means its geographic focus by default is developing countries in sub-Saharan Africa, Latin America and Asia. However, in principle anyone living in a rural area anywhere in the world could benefit from the network's activities.

The underlying problem that a network such as RWSN is trying to solve is that millions of people in rural areas of developing countries have no access to safe drinking water. For example, an estimate in 2016 put the figure at 300 million people without safe drinking water in rural Africa. The Joint Monitoring Programme for Water Supply and Sanitation of WHO and UNICEF said in 2022 that 411 million people in Africa (3 out of 5 people) still lacked basic drinking water services in 2020. The situation is worse for rural areas in Africa where only 22% had access to basic drinking water services in 2020 compared to urban areas with 59%. Target 6.1 of Sustainable Development Goal 6 is: "By 2030, achieve universal and equitable access to safe and affordable drinking water for all".

Through its work, RWSN aims to address the challenges faced by rural communities, such as inadequate infrastructure and limited financial resources. Since around 2021, RWSN is also explicitly working on aspects that are related to the impacts of climate change, such as climate resilient water services in rural areas.

== Activities ==
The aim of RWSN is "to improve the quality of rural water services and their management".

=== Knowledge sharing and networking ===
Key activities of RWSN include the development of technical guidelines and standards, the dissemination of research findings, and the promotion of innovative technologies and approaches. RWSN participates in the creation of peer-reviewed guidelines and case studies which are hosted in the RWSN virtual library on their website.

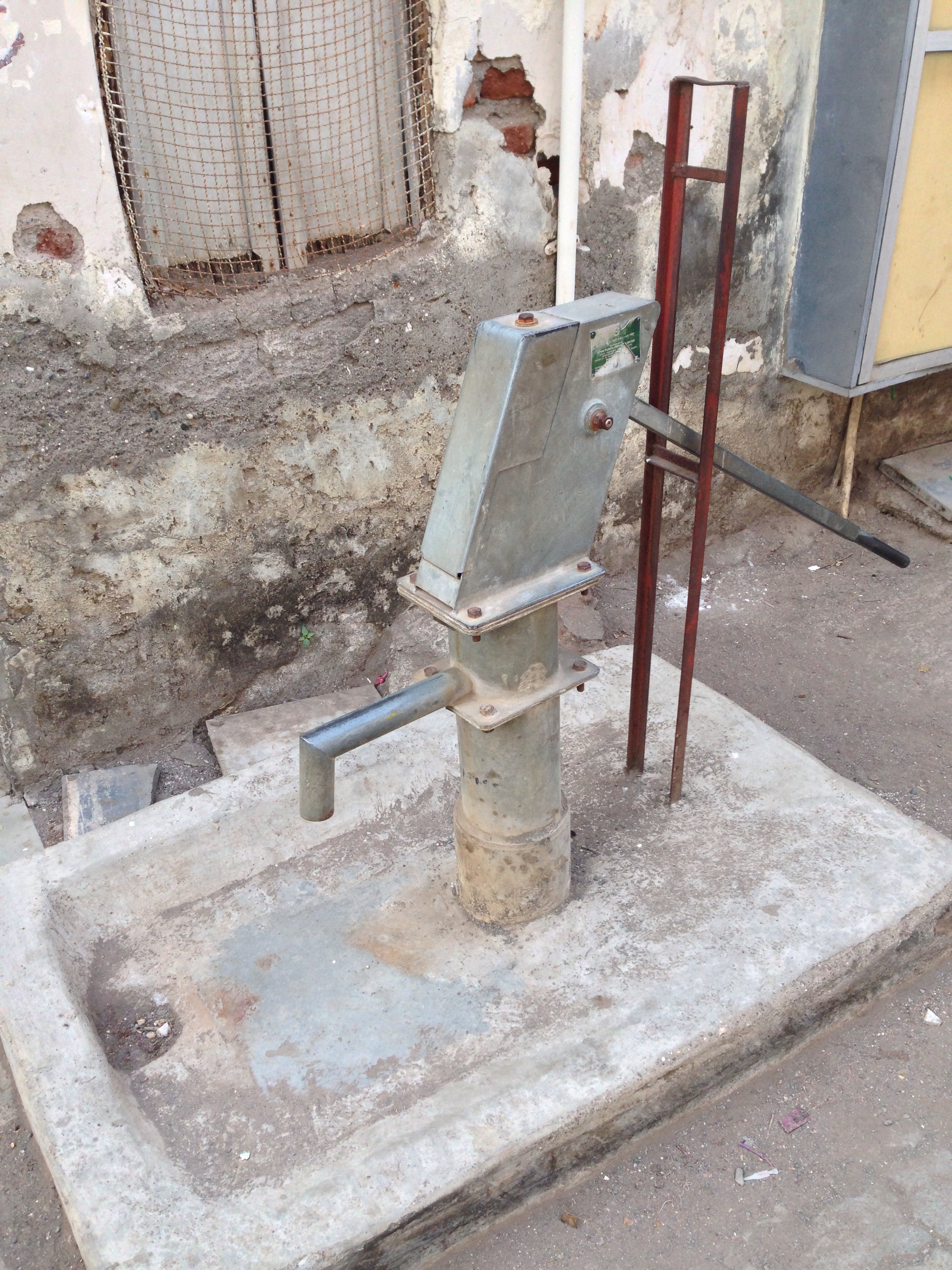
A typical India Mark II hand pump in India.

RWSN regularly runs activities around knowledge sharing and networking, such as online discussion groups and webinars in English, French and Spanish on topics relating to rural water supply and WASH (water supply, sanitation and hygiene). For example, the World Bank and RWSN ran their first joint webinar series in 2012. WHO and RWSN had a joint "Launch webinar for WHO guidelines and tools to enhance small water supplies" in February 2024.

RWSN provides a platform for raising awareness around chronic failures in water supply systems. The platform also supports activities around research and drilling professionalisation and new service delivery models.

Every year at the World Water Week in Stockholm that is organised by Stockholm International Water Institute, RWSN is convener and co-convener of several sessions to advance the debates around rural water supply.

==== International standard specifications for handpumps ====
When organisations specify handpumps in contracts, there are often questions around specifying the pipes and rods. To help with this problem, RWSN has published international standard specifications for some handpumps, for example the India Mark II and III handpumps. These specifications have to be regularly updated and maintained, and RWSN facilitates this process. This can be done for example by leaning on international standards bodies, in particular ASTM and ISO.

=== Organising global conferences ===
Every five years since 1992, RWSN has organised a global conference dedicated to rural water supply, called the RWSN Forum. So far, there have been seven RWSN Forums. All of them, except for one in India, took place in Sub-Saharan Africa:

- The International Handpump Workshop in Kenya in 1992.
- 2nd HTN Workshop in Malawi in 1997.
- 3rd International HTN Forum in India in 2000.
- 4th Forum in South Africa in 2003 (called 4th International HTN Forum).
- 5th RWSN Forum in Ghana in 2006.
- 6th RWSN Forum in Uganda in 2011.
- The most recent conference was the 7th RWSN Forum in Abidjan, co-hosted by the Government of Cote d'Ivoire, in 2016. It was opened by the then Prime Minister Kablan Duncan. One of the main sponsors of the event was the African Development Bank through its Rural Water Supply and Sanitation Initiative (RWSSI).
- The 8th RWSN Forum in 2021 was postponed due to the COVID-19 pandemic. There have been no announcements of upcoming RWSN Forums since then.

== Structure ==
=== Secretariat and members ===
The secretariat has been hosted from the start and until now by Skat Foundation in St. Gallen, Switzerland. It coordinates and runs the network activities, in partnership with theme leaders and under the supervision and guidance of the executive steering committee.

Membership for individuals and organisations is free and not time-limited. RWSN has over 16,000 members in 168 countries (as of 2023) from government agencies, non-governmental organizations (NGOs), research institutions, and private companies.

=== Themes ===
Local citizens bring their herds to drink at a newly constructed well site in Shant Abak, Kenya in 2008. The well can pump 25 gallons of water per minute, for local livestock.

There are currently six themes, each with one or several team leaders from various organisations. Theme leaders are either volunteers or are paid by their employers to carry out RWSN networking, training and knowledge exchange activities. Theme leaders are very important to RWSN’s activities. As of 2024, the themes of RWSN include: Leave no-one behind (realisation of human rights to water and sanitation for the most marginalised people), Data for action, Multiple use water services (water for livelihoods as well as for households), Self-supply of water and sanitation, Sustainable groundwater development, Sustainable services.

=== Executive steering committee ===
The network is governed by an executive steering committee. This committee consists of organisations that are "significant global actors in supporting rural water supply and that have demonstrated their commitment to RWSN activities". The organisations that make up the steering committee have changed over time and currently (in 2023) consist of the following nine organisations: African Development Bank, BGR (Federal Institute for Geosciences and Natural Resources), Global Water Center, One for All Alliance (IRC, Water for Good, Water for People), Skat Foundation, UNICEF, WaterAid, Welthungerhilfe, World Bank.

As of March 2024 Lisa Mitchell and Benjamin Filskov from the Global Water Center, a US-based NGO founded in 2020, will serve on the Executive Committee of RWSN. The two organisations share a vision of "a world where everyone has access to safely managed water".

A statement by World Bank in 2012 explained how World Bank is related to RWSN: "The World Bank and WSP are executive partner organizations of RWSN" along with others. There is ongoing cooperation between World Bank and RWSN.

=== Affiliations and partnerships ===
RWSN has been a UN-Water Partner since 2020. RWSN is also a strategic partner of UNICEF on providing guidance for water supply, sanitation and hygiene programmes on practical implementation of topics like Leave No-one Behind and water well drilling professionalization.

In 2021, RWSN became one of the implementing partners in the programme "Rural Evidence and Learning for Water (REAL-Water)" which is funded by USAID and led by Aquaya.

Since 2022 RWSN is in a partnership with Inter-American Development Bank (IDB). The aim is "to support networking and knowledge sharing within Latin America and South-South exchange with Africa and Asia". This is part of a project called "Sustainable and Innovative Rural Water, Sanitation and Hygiene" (SIRWASH).

The African Water Facility (AWF) counts RWNS as one of its partners as well. The AWF has a governing council with 13 members that are appointed by AMCOW, donors to the fund, the African Development Bank, the African Union and UN-Water/Africa.

== Funding sources ==
For many years, the Swiss Agency for Development and Cooperation (SDC) was providing core funding to RWSN. As of 2023 this is no longer the case and their support to RWSN is now only indirect and project based. SDC provided core funding during four phases: The first phase was 2012 to 2014 followed by Phase 2 from 2015 to 2017, Phase 3 from 2018-2020, and Phase 4 from 2021 to 2022.

During the period 2018-2020, the RWSN secretariat had income from 15 sources of partner contributions and project funding. The largest single contribution (30%) during that time was from the SDC. The second biggest source of funding (25%) was from the UPGro programme ("Unlocking the Potential of Groundwater for the Poor"), followed by 14% from the ZH2O Drink and Donate program.

Member organisations make "substantial annual financial contribution to the backbone functions of the network". In 2020, financial and in-kind support to RWSN came for example from the Swiss Agency for Development and Cooperation (SDC), UNICEF, The United Kingdom DFID, NERC and ESRC through the UPGro programme and the REACH programme (with Oxford University), Skat Consulting Ltd and about a dozen others.

In general, there is significant in-kind support of the network through its governance structures, such as the executive steering committee. Many of the executive committee organisations also provide cash support. The secretariat complements its core funds with project based work. One sellable service is that of being a knowledge broker.

RWSN also collaborates with the Sustainable Sanitation Alliance. For example, in 2020, RWSN had a project funded by WSSCC to run and improve the SuSanA Discussion Forum, a "vibrant online community within the sanitation sector".

== Impacts ==
A busy India Mark II pump in Uganda. Children often bear the responsibility for collecting water. Durability needs to be incorporated into pump design.

One of the achievements of RWSN is that it strengthens the skills of professionals in the rural water sector. An independent evaluation of RWSN in 2017 found that: "The RWSN is a highly competent, advanced community-building network which connects people who would likely not have been connected before and disseminates valuable knowledge to its members, which can be applied to practice." It also stated that "the RWSN has been described to be the prime network that supports scale up of rural water supply for practitioners".

Drilling professionalization and cost-effective boreholes has been a long-running focus of work and collaboration, with an estimated USD 750,000 invested in research, guidelines and training over 16 years (2004-2020)

RWSN often collaborates on joint publications with large organisations such as the World Bank. For example, in 2019 there was a World Bank–Skat Foundation collaboration for the RWSN on the topic of "Innovations in rural water supply sustainability". Another example is the collaboration of RWSN with the 2022 UN World Water Development Report "Groundwater: Making the invisible visible" where RWSN was a chapter lead agency for Chapter 4 on "Groundwater for human settlements".

The Swiss Agency for Development and Cooperation, one of the funders of RWSN, provided a snapshot of the work of RWSN as follows: "The Rural Water Supply Network (RWSN) is the only global network to offer powerful, effective mechanisms to share expertise and collaborate with local and global partners to trial and scale up innovation and to raise the quality and professionalism in rural water supplies."

The African Development Bank values the conferences (forums) that RWSN organises and stated at the RWSN forum in 2016: "the Rural Water Supply Network forum is a unique opportunity for global and regional players to exchange knowledge and identify practical solutions"

== Challenges ==
An independent evaluation in 2017 highlighted challenges with funding the network in the future (a common challenge for many networks): "RWSN should continue looking to diversify its funding from a diverse range of sources, including donor, public and private funds and potentially in the future, from upgraded services".

Specific and direct criticisms of the RWSN are not documented in the public domain. However, like many organizations involved in international development, RWSN is facing challenges with regards to innovation and sustainability of water supply interventions. For example, the sustainability of handpump technologies or of community-led water supply initiatives is a continuous challenge.

== History ==
The network was founded as the Handpump Technology Network (HTN) after The International Handpump Workshop in Kakamega, Kenya in 1992. It was initially a working group for hand pump technology. HTN was renamed the Rural Water Supply Network in 2004.

At the Fourth RWSN Forum in Durban in 2003 a decision was made that RWSN would focus its work on three key areas: self-supply, cost-effective boreholes and sustainable handpumps.

== See also ==
- WASH – Water, sanitation and hygiene services
