= Ann Wigglesworth =

British fair trade pioneer (1939–2022)

- Born: Ann Livesley; 21 March 1939
- Died: 24 September 2022 (aged 83)
- Education: Girton College Cambridge
- Known for: Fair trade and social justice leadership, and education in Scotland and India
- Awards: Aberdeen Woman of the Year, 1985

Ann Wigglesworth (21 March 1939 – 24 September 2022) fair trade pioneer, educator and Aberdeen Woman of the Year 1985.

== Early life and education ==
Born Ann Livesley on 21 March 1939, in Wallasey, Merseyside. Her parents were Cliff and Mary Livesley, and she had a younger brother, John. She went to Oldershaw School and was studious, sporty and became one of the first Queen's Guides in that area. She studied zoology at Girton College, Cambridge University, graduating in 1961.

Wigglesworth was later to become a science teacher at four senior schools in the city of Aberdeen: Aberdeen Grammar School, Hazlehead Academy, Northfield Academy, Torry Academy.

== Work and volunteering ==
Following the Second World War, Ann Livesley spent a year working in a refugee camp in Austria. In 1958, as she was going to a Christian study camp on the Isle of Raasay, she met her future husband, Reverend Chris Wigglesworth, who later became an OBE. They married in 1962, and lived in Huddersfield where they both taught in the local schools and had a daughter, Judith. In 1964, the Wigglesworths moved to Edinburgh, where her husband studied for Christian ministry, and they hosted international students regularly. Wigglesworth worked for the 'cutting edge' Traverse Theatre.

The Wigglesworths went to India, when Chris Wigglesworth was sent to Maharashtra, a Church of Scotland mission to develop hydro-engineering facilities for irrigation using his skills to develop a hand-pump still in use today (India Mark II). Their son John was born there. Ann Wigglesworth opened a Montessori school and volunteered with slum dwellers in Bombay (Mumbai), when her husband was minister at the Scots Kirk. She helped local women to use their skills to create a craft business that could generate a regular income, a method later known as fair trade.

In 1979, on returning to Scotland, Wigglesworth was in Aberdeen, teaching again in local secondary schools. She had another two daughters, Karen and Sara. With her husband's active role as a Labour councillor, as well as university lecturer, she was involved in the Labour and social justice movements, and hosted leading anti-apartheid campaigners such as Adelaide Tambo and Desmond Tutu.

== Fair trade leadership ==
Wigglesworth was committed to making a fair trade shop a working example, and selling tea, coffee, clothing and jewellery which had been sourced ethically, was initially located in St. Nicholas Kirk in central Aberdeen. In 1983, she was a leader in raising awareness of the Fairtrade City movement, influencing the city council and bringing together a multi-denominational team to create a Third World Centre, which became a registered company in 1988. This used goods from the faith-based Traidcraft supply chain who offered producers in the developing world a fair price for their goods, as well as Wrigglesworth sourcing some directly imported produce. Her influence expanded to fair trade in schools, and helping university students to promote the message of fairness in global trade. She organised supplying stalls and stores in churches and community groups, and gave talks on the possibilities of change in the way trade is conducted.

In 1989, Wigglesworth was asked to write about ten years of Traidcraft and the fair trade movement in the Church of Scotland national magazine, Life and Work.

From the work that Wigglesworth began, Aberdeen Council was able to meet the criteria for becoming the first Scottish Fairtrade City (along with Dundee) in March 2004.

Visitors from Fairtrade producer organisations in Africa and Asia were invited to share the impact the organisation and movement had had on their lives, with the people who were buying the produce in Aberdeen. But as other mainstream charities and supermarkets or brands began to sell Fairtrade accredited produce, and with pressures due to a financial recession, the specialist shop eventually closed in 2011.

Wrigglesworth's organisation had developed teaching materials for schools and universities about social justice, and she led workshops, using the unit's lending library of resources, suitable for the formal education curriculum, eventually leading to an education centre in Aberdeen, the Montgomery Development Centre, based at Queen Street Church.

In 2014, the outreach organisation that Wigglesworth had begun became Aberdeen for a Fairer World, a Scottish charitable incorporated organisation (SCIO).

Wigglesworth was honoured in 1985 by the City as one of three Women of the Year, on the theme of peace.

In 1987, the Wigglesworth moved to back to Edinburgh, where she taught in Graysmill School, and volunteered with the Citizen's Advice Bureau.

=== Politics ===
Wigglesworth's notions and role as an active worker for social justice, based on her faith was not welcomed by all. An American tourist visiting the 15th century chapel where the Aberdeen fair trade shop was based, said it was a 'vulgar display of garish politically-propagandistic posters and cheap merchandise'.

Wigglesworth was an active member of the Labour party, supporting her husband as a councillor in both Aberdeen and Edinburgh.

== Death and legacy ==
Ann Wigglesworth died on 24 September 2022 in Edinburgh, aged 83. Her funeral was held in St Giles Cathedral, Edinburgh. The current leader of Aberdeen Fairtrade City group, Sue Good, said "Ann is firmly established as one of the pioneers of Fairtrade in Aberdeen and, as such, will be remembered."
