= Care and Relief Foundation =

UK non-profit organisation

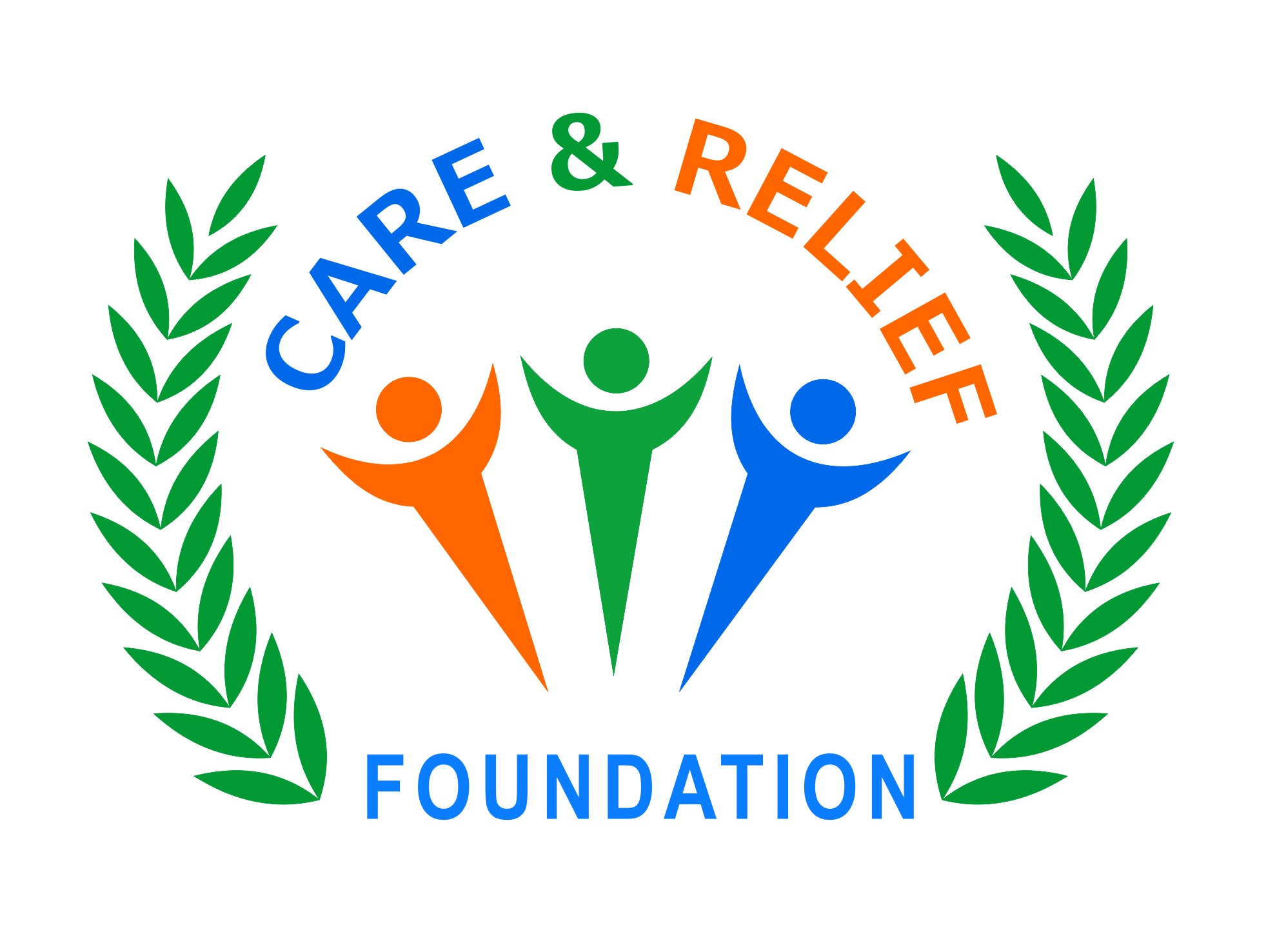
- Founded: 2012
- Purpose: Emergency Services, Orphans, Healthcare and Nutrition, Mosque Construction, Availability of Drinking Water (RO Plant), Food Distribution, Rozgar, Solar Energy, Hand Pump, Water Dug Well, Solar Tube well
- Location: Birmingham, Pakpattan, Tharparkar
- Method: Donations and Grants
- Key people: Syed Zafar Ullah Shah
- Website: careandrelief.uk

Care and Relief Foundation (Urdu: کئیر اینڈ ریلیف فاؤنڈیشن) or CRF, is an independent, non-profit organisation, founded in 2012 by Allama Syed Zafar Ullah Shah and is based in the United Kingdom. The primary aim of the Care and Relief Foundation is to enable those deprived of their basic rights of life. The Care and Relief Foundation believes firmly in helping those who cannot help themselves to be self-sufficient to meet their basic needs. This non-profit organization works in Pakistan and abroad to provide food, clean water, medical facilities, solar power and equipment for people with disabilities for rehabilitation and social inclusion.

== Introduction ==
Care and Relief Foundation's humanitarian activities started when Syed Zafar Ullah Shah permanently moved to Britain from Pakistan. He has been working with UK Based charity Islamic Help for long time. In 2012, he formally established the non profit organization with the name of Care and Relief Foundation.

== Mission ==
Care and Relief Foundation is a nonprofit organization, whose main objectives are as follows:

- Water Project (Water for All)
- Food Project (Food for All)
- Light for All
- Mosque Construction
- Emergency Services
- orphanage
- Shadi Project

== Water Project ==
The Water Project is the main project of the Care & Relief Foundation. It focuses on providing water infrastructure to rural localities in Pakistan.

=== Dug well ===
Care & Relief Foundation has been working in Tharparkar under the attribution of project of Sabeel-e-Hussaini. Care & Relief Foundation has achieved the completion of first initial stages of project, in selected several village regions with the constructions of dug wells.

=== Hand pump ===
Hand pumps are one of convenient ways for being supplied instantaneously with water. People of district Tharparkar are used to hand pumps for their short chores of daily life. Care and Relief Foundation, has been concerned with this, as next to priority after wells. Care and Relief Foundation has located many regions, where it is better to have there a hand pump, then a well, for their usage are at maximum indices.

=== RO Plant ===
Care and Relief Foundation, took initiative and planted RO Plants in Tharparkar, Umerkot and Pind Dadan Khan so that people in these areas can gain access to clean drinking water.

== Food Project ==
Food Project, has been projected as an activity, with intentions of providing the poverty-stricken inhabitants of less developed areas and countryside regions, with necessary means, so as that, regional poverty can be revoked by strengthened individual economy, and by stabilizing the income generating abilities of individuals, families & communities.

== Light for All ==
Tharparkar, has another thing added for its misfortune, and that is the facility of electricity, which is now the days, is regarded the most of all, influential and effective factor of the development of civilizational state of people, and their economical as well as financial phase. Care & Relief Foundation has started a project with the name "Enlightenment Initiative". Here the former part of name means, brightening the darkness of their lives, rendered by harsh conditions, and the later portion just signifies the first place and emphasizes the furtherance in its scope.

Enlightenment Initiative has been carried out to be in act, initially by the installations of home small electrical setups powered by the solar cells. Recently a few of houses & families has been benefited with, and in upcoming days, few of villages be benefited with these solar panels. Project materials are included of simple, but essential appliances, such as single fan, pair of fluorescence light savers.

== Mosque construction ==
Care and Relief foundation has taken initiative to construct Masjids in the area of Tharparkar. The Mosques are mainly built on the land where the previous one stood and will continue to be looked after by the communities they serve with the support of Care and Relief Foundation. Care and Relief Foundation build Masajid to educate the Muslim children, to aware the Muslims about religion and Islamic practices, to socialize the village, for the religious celebrations in village.

== Emergency services ==
Care and Relief foundation provides emergency relief in natural disasters by supplying food, water, camps and free medical camps.

== Orphanage ==
Care and Relief Foundation sponsor hundreds of orphans in Tharparkar, Pakistan. Care and Relief Foundation provides them shelter, food, education (both Islamic and Scientific) clothing and medical care.

== See also ==
- Volunteerism
