= African Ministers Council on Water =

Ministers' Council on water and sanitation in Africa

African Ministers' Council on Water
- Conseil des Ministres Africains Chargés de L'eau
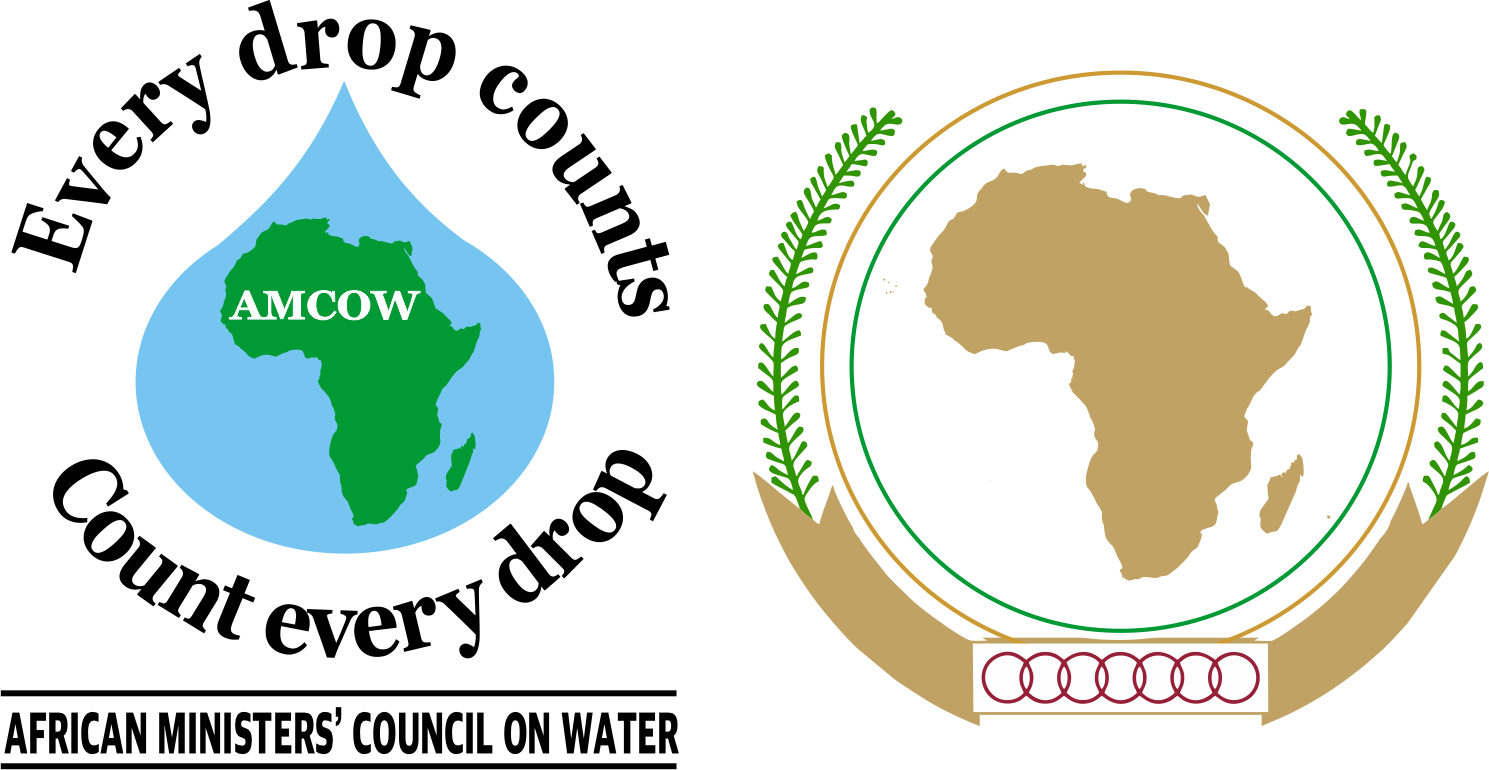
- AMCOW Logo

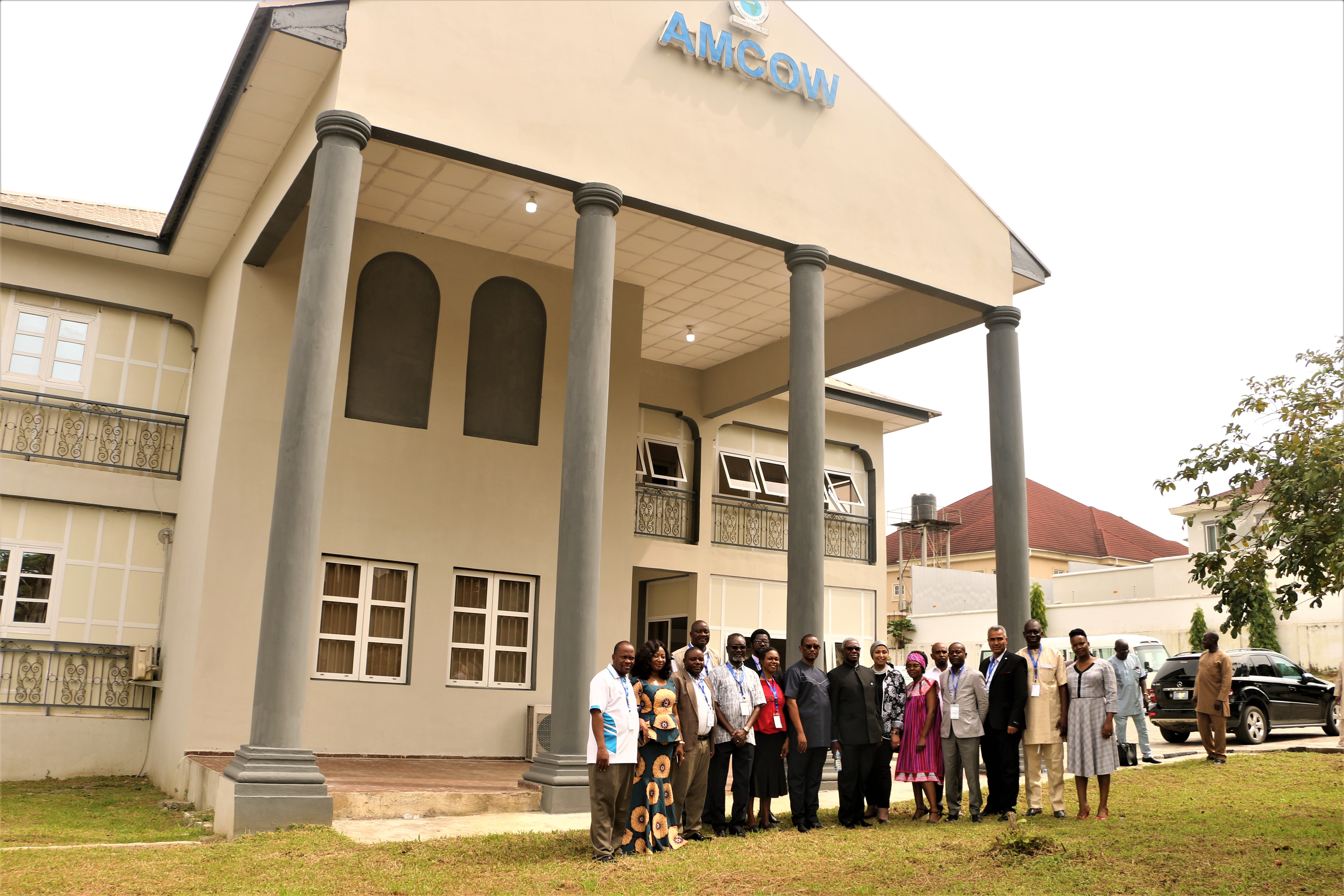
- AMCOW Office Headquarter in Abuja
- Abbreviation: AMCOW
- Nickname: Water and sanitation support mechanism for the African Union's Specialised Technical Committee.
- Formation: 2002
- Founder: African Ministers in charge of Water and Sanitation
- Founded at: Abuja
- Type: Nonprofit, Intergovernmental Organisation
- Legal status: Legal
- Purpose: Support delivery of Africa's water resources management and sustainable water supply and sanitation services.
- Headquarters: Abuja
- Location: Federal Capital Territory, Nigeria
- Region served: Africa
- Members: 55 Countries of African Union
- Parent organization: African Union
- Website: www.amcow-online.org

The African Ministers' Council on Water (AMCOW) (French: Conseil des Ministres Africains Chargés de L'eau), is considered by the African Union as the support mechanism for its Specialised Technical Committee (STC) to drive achievement in the water and sanitation sectors. It is a regional development network of 55 African countries that advances socioeconomic development and the abolition of poverty through effective cooperation, management of water supply services, and provision of the continent's water resources to its members.

== History ==
In April 2002, the African Ministers responsible for water meeting in Abuja, Nigeria, formed the African Ministerial Conference on Water (AMCOW) following the adoption of the "Abuja Ministerial Declaration on Water - a key to Sustainable Development". The organization was formed to accelerate the achievement of water and sanitation goals in Africa. In 2008, at the 11th Ordinary Session of the African Union (AU) Assembly in Sharm el-Sheikh Egypt, African Heads of State and Government, mandated AMCOW to establish and monitor a strategy for the implementation of their commitments on accelerating sanitation and hygiene.

== Governing structure ==
The institutional structure of the AMCOW consists of a Council of Ministers (the Ministers responsible for water in each Member Country), an executive committee (EXCO) with a President/Chair, and a Board of Directors (currently Namibia). Each of the five sub-regions is represented on the executive committee by three representatives/water Ministers (AMCOW member states are divided into five sub-regions: West Africa, Eastern Africa, Central Africa, North Africa, and Southern Africa) for the coordination of sub-regional activities.

A vice president oversees each sub-region. The AMCOW Secretariat is based in Abuja, Nigeria, and is led by an interim Executive Secretary and a team of professional and support workers. A Technical Advisory Committee (TAC) serves as the Executive Committee's advisor. The executive committee is responsible for ensuring that the council's decisions are carried out, as well as developing work programs/budgets for approval by the council, mobilizing necessary funding, and supervising the Secretariat's activities.

The primary functions of AMCOW are to facilitate regional and international cooperation by coordinating policies and actions among African countries on water resources issues, to review and mobilize additional financing for the African water sector, providing a mechanism for monitoring the progress of major regional and global water resources, water supply, and sanitation initiatives.

AMCOW also serves as a forum for dialogue on water issues with UN agencies and other partners. It encourages participation in regional studies on climate change, the development of observation networks, the exchange of information, and the development of policies and strategies to address water issues in Africa.

== Mission and Vision ==
Mission:To provide political leadership, policy direction and advocacy in the provision, use and management of water resources for sustainable social and economic development and maintenance of African ecosystems.

Vision: To accomplish the 2025 Africa Water Vision by effectively managing Africa's water resources and providing water supply services. To foster cooperation, security, social and economic growth, and the eradication of poverty among member states.

== Initiatives ==
- The African Groundwater Programme
- AMCOW Pan African Groundwater Programme (APAGroP)
- African Water and Sanitation Monitoring (WASSMO) System
- African Water and Sanitation Knowledge Management Challenge
- African Sanitation Policy Guidelines (ASPG)
- Youth and Gender Inclusion program
- Online Knowledge Hub
- Mukhtari Shehu Shagari Resource Centre

== Activities ==
- Africa Focus Day
- Africa Water and Sanitation Week
- African Water Facility (AWF)
- AfricaSan

== Achievements ==
The major AMCOW achievements includes:

- Developed a 10 years water Strategic plan for implementation between 2018 and 2030.
- Established a ministerial mechanism supported by a network of senior water officials for systematic consideration of water policy challenges in Africa.
- Provided support for regional integration.
- Adopted a triennial work program that provides strategic direction for national, regional, and international cooperation.
- Provided organizational, political, and institutional support for the implementation of major water initiatives.
- Compiled key water portfolios for the five sub-regions of Africa, the establishment of the African Water Facility (AWF) which is hosted and managed by the African Development Bank, and establishment of a Trust Fund under the United Nations Environment Programme (UNEP).
- Developed reports on the AfricaSan Ngor Commitment Monitoring of Heads of State and Government to accelerate sanitation and hygiene development in Africa.
- Developed an African Groundwater Programme.
- In November 2020 a web based open access knowledge hub was launched for collecting and sharing Africa's water and sanitation information and knowledge.
- In 2021 the African Sanitation Policy Guideline was developed with the support of the Bill and Melinda Gates Foundation (BMGF).
- Commemorated its 15th anniversary in November, 2017. It will be commemorating its 20th anniversary during the World Water Forum in Dakar, Senegal, in March 2022.

== Member states ==
- Algeria
- Angola
- Benin
- Botswana
- Burkina Faso
- Burundi
- Cameroon
- Cape Verde
- Central African Republic
- Chad
- Comoros
- Democratic Republic of the Congo
- Djibouti
- Egypt
- Equatorial Guinea
- Eritrea
- Eswatini
- Ethiopia
- Gabon
- Gambia
- Ghana
- Guinea
- Guinea-Bissau
- Ivory Coast
- Kenya
- Lesotho
- Liberia
- Libya
- Madagascar
- Malawi
- Mali
- Mauritania
- Mauritius
- Morocco
- Mozambique
- Namibia
- Niger
- Nigeria
- Republic of the Congo
- Rwanda
- Sahrawi Arab Democratic Republic
- São Tomé and Príncipe
- Senegal
- Seychelles
- Sierra Leone
- Somalia
- South Africa
- South Sudan
- Sudan
- Tanzania
- Togo
- Tunisia
- Uganda
- Zambia
- Zimbabwe

== See also ==
- African Union
- Friends of the African Union
- List of country groupings
