= Ras Abu Jarjur =

Ras Abu Jarjur is a reverse osmosis water desalination plant in Bahrain. The plant produces 16.3 million imperial gallons of desalinated drinking water per day. At the time of its commissioning in the mid-1980s it was the largest reverse osmosis plant in the Middle East with a production capacity of 10 million imperial gallons per day.
