= Hand pump =

Type of manually operated pump

Cross section and details of a pitcher pump

Animation of a suction hand pump. On the up stroke of the piston the foot valve opens and suction brings water into the pump head. On the following down stroke of the piston the valve on the piston opens up and allows water to flow above the piston. On the successive up stroke of the piston water is pushed out of the outlet.

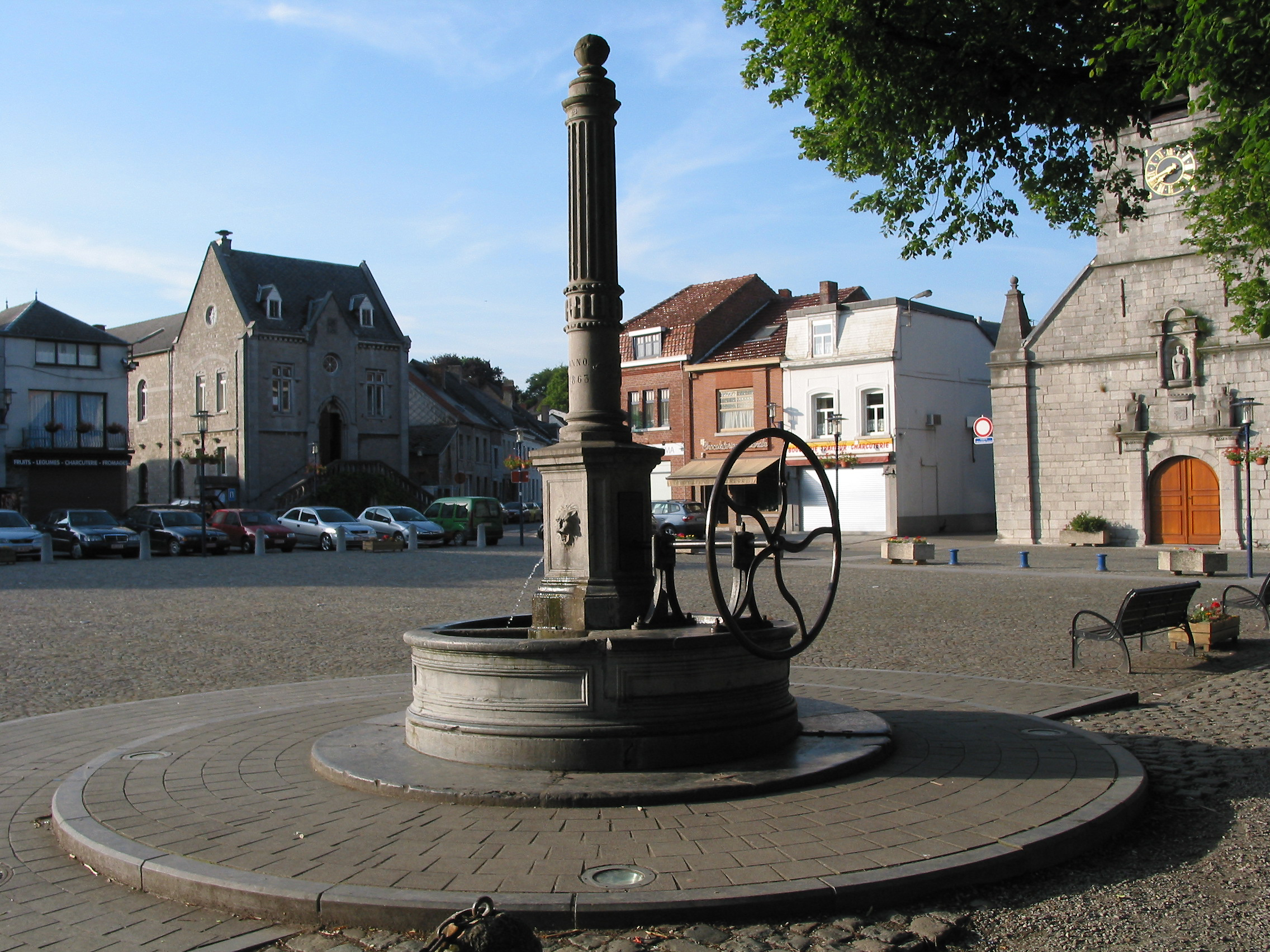
A rural handpump in Belgium.

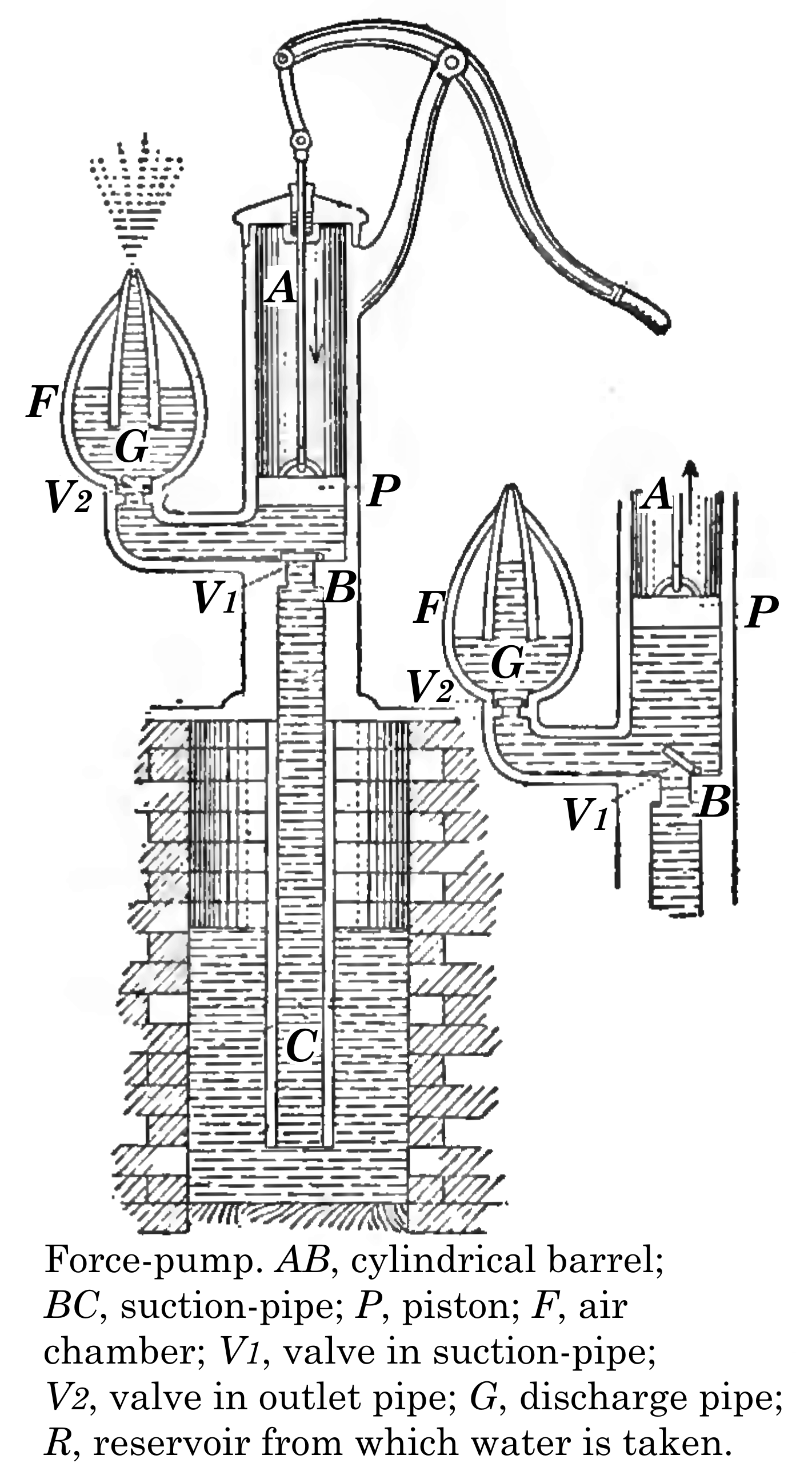
Hand-powered force pump, with an air chamber to smooth out variations in flow rate

Hand pumps are manually operated pumps; they use human power and mechanical advantage to move fluids or air from one place to another. They are widely used in every country in the world for a variety of industrial, marine, irrigation and leisure activities. There are many different types of hand pump available, mainly operating on a piston, diaphragm or rotary vane principle with a check valve on the entry and exit ports to the chamber operating in opposing directions. Most hand pumps are either piston pumps or plunger pumps, and are positive displacement.

Hand pumps are commonly used in developing countries for both community supply and self-supply of water and can be installed on boreholes or hand-dug wells.

== History ==
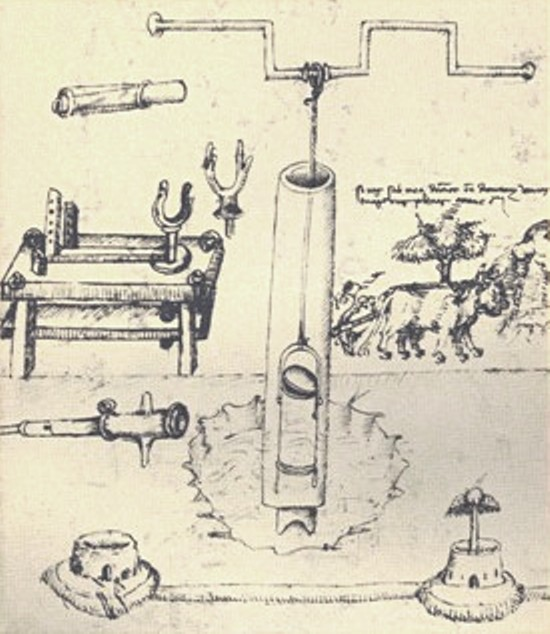
First European depiction of a piston pump, by Taccola, c.1450.

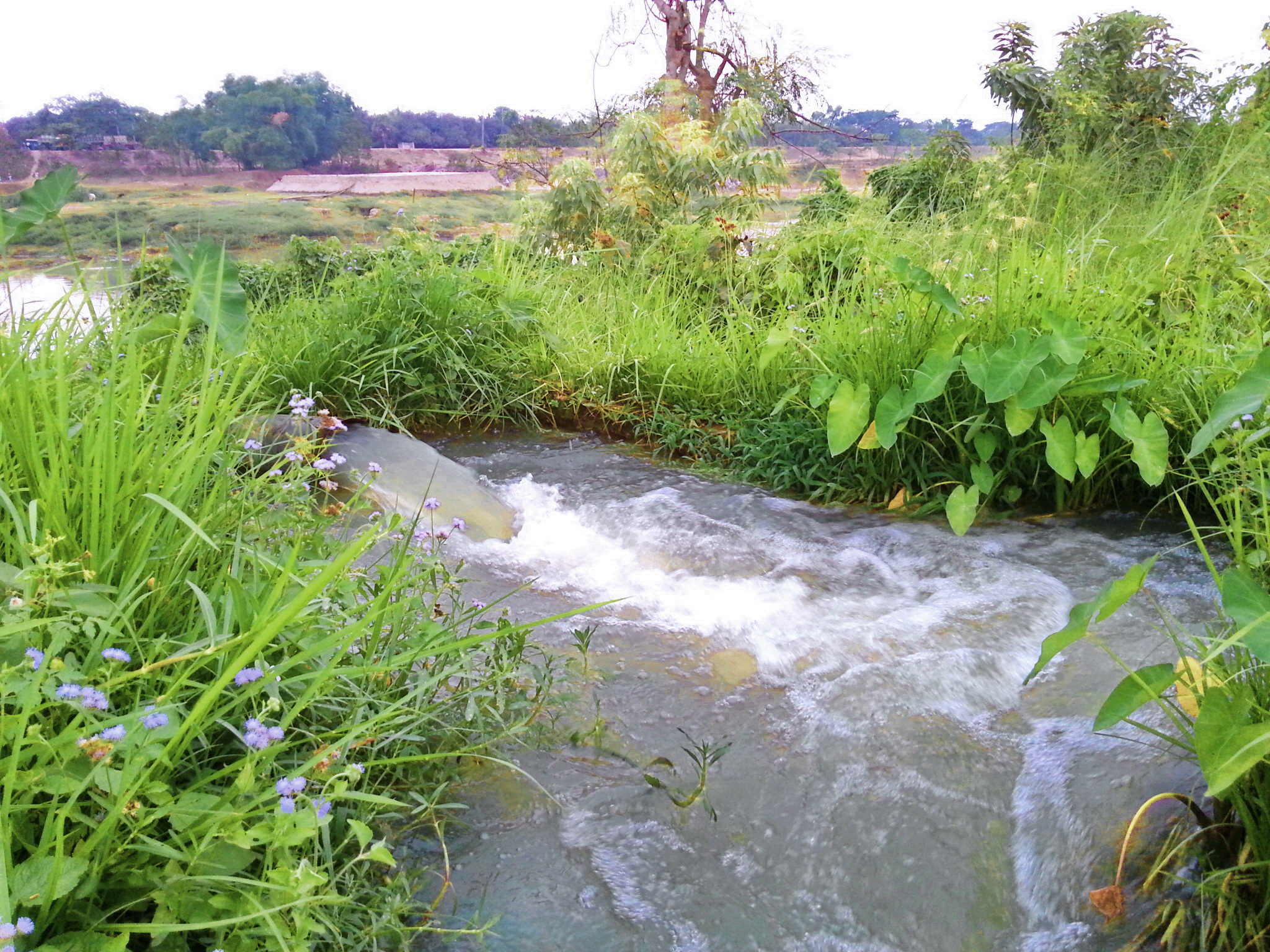
Irrigation is under way by pump-enabled extraction directly from the Gumti, seen in the background, in Comilla, Bangladesh.

One sort of pump once common worldwide was a hand-powered water pump, or 'pitcher pump'. It was commonly installed over community water wells in the days before piped water supplies.

In parts of Britain and Ireland, it was often called the parish pump. Though such community pumps are no longer common, people still used the expression parish pump to describe a place or forum where matters of local interest are discussed, or parish pump politics for politics which prioritizes local issues.

Because water from pitcher pumps is drawn directly from the soil, it is more prone to contamination. If such water is not filtered and purified, consumption of it might lead to gastrointestinal or other water-borne diseases. A notorious case is the 1854 Broad Street cholera outbreak. At the time it was not known how cholera was transmitted, but physician John Snow suspected contaminated water and had the handle of the public pump he suspected removed; the outbreak then subsided.

Modern hand-operated community pumps are considered the most sustainable low-cost option for safe water supply in resource-poor settings, often in rural areas in developing countries. A hand pump opens access to deeper groundwater that is often not polluted and also improves the safety of a well by protecting the water source from contaminated buckets. Pumps such as the Afridev pump are designed to be cheap to build and install, and easy to maintain with simple parts. However, scarcity of spare parts for these types of pumps in some regions of Africa has diminished their utility for these areas.

== Types ==
=== Suction and lift hand pumps ===
Suction and lift are important considerations when pumping fluids. Suction is the vertical distance between the fluid to be pumped and the centre of the pump, while lift is the vertical distance between the pump and the delivery point. The depth from which a hand pump will suck is limited by atmospheric pressure to less than seven meters. The height to which a hand pump will lift is governed by the ability of the pump and the operator to lift the weight in the delivery pipe. Thus the same pump and operator will be able to achieve a greater lift with a smaller-diameter pipe than they could with a larger-diameter pipe.

In addition to their use in drawing water from shallow groundwater sources for water supplies, another version of the hand-powered suction pump, with low lift and high delivery, was developed in the later 19th century for use as a ship's bilge pump (for smaller coastal vessels) and as a building site contractor's pump. It was known as a deluge pump. One manufacturer who illustrated this product from the late 1880s onwards into the early 20th century was Goulds Manufacturing Co.

=== Force pump ===
Where it is necessary to raise water to a height above that to which a suction or lift pump will operate effectively (about seven metres), or to raise the pressure so that it will exit a nozzle with a strong force, such as through a fire hose, a force pump may be used. As with a suction pump, in its manual form it relies on an operator to pump a handle. The difference is, however, that after the water is sucked through the lower valve (as a result of raising the piston that is attached to the handle), its means of exit is via a pipe or nozzle in the side of the main cylinder. The water, once it has been drawn up above the lower valve and trapped there, is forced out the exit when the piston or plunger is pushed down again on the next stroke.

=== Siphon ===
A siphon (or syphon) at its simplest is a bent tube with one end placed in the water to be moved and the other end into the vessel to receive the water. The receiving vessel must be at a lower level than the supplying vessel. Water will always try to find its lowest level. Using this principle, very simple bulb pumps, with flap valves at each end, are used for emptying fuel or water cans into tanks. Once the liquid fills enough of the tube the fluid will flow without further effort from the higher to the lower container. Many hand pumps will allow the passage of fluid through them in the direction of flow and diaphragm pumps are particularly good at this. Thus where the levels are correct large volumes of liquid, such as in swimming pools, can be emptied with very little effort and no expensive energy use.

=== Chain pump ===
A chain pump is made of an endless chain carrying a series of discs that descend into the water, and then ascend inside a tube, carrying with them a large quantity of water. They are a simply made, old hand-powered pumping technology In the 18th century they were used as ship's bilge pumps. A chain pump is a type of water pump that uses a chain to move water from one place to another. It works on the principle of a continuous loop of chain moving through a series of sprockets, with attached buckets that lift water as the chain passes over the top sprocket and discharge it as the chain reaches the bottom.

=== Direct action ===
Direct action hand pumps have a pumping rod that is moved up and down, directly by the user, discharging water. Direct action handpumps are easy to install and maintain but are limited to the maximum column of water a person can physically lift of up to 15 m. Examples of direct action pumps include the canzee pump and the EMAS pump.

=== Deep wells ===
Deep well hand pumps are used for high lifts of more than 15 m. The weight of the column of water is too great to be lifted directly and some form of mechanical advantage system such as a lever or flywheel is used. High lift pumps need to be stronger and sturdier to cope with the extra stresses. The installation, maintenance and repair of deep well hand pumps is more complicated than with other hand pumps. A deep well hand pump theoretically has no limit to which it can extract water. In practice, the depth is limited by the physical power a human being can exert in lifting the column of water, which is around 30 m

=== Diaphragm ===
Diaphragm pumps have the advantage that they pump relatively lightly due to the lack of pulling rods and are corrosion resistant. Their disadvantage is that they need a specific length of tubing and high quality rubber diaphragms, which are costly and are relatively inefficient due to the extra work needed to deform the diaphragm. Rubber diaphragms will eventually leak and need to be replaced. Because this is usually complicated and costly, diaphragm pumps operating in poor rural areas are often abandoned once the diaphragm wears out.

=== Progressive cavity ===
Progressive cavity pumps consist of a single helix rotor inserted into a double helix stator. As the rotor is turned, the voids in the stator are screwed upwards along the axis of rotation. Progressive cavity pumps can have complicated gearing mechanisms and are difficult for local pump technicians to maintain and repair. A rope and washer pump is a type of progressive cavity hand pump.

=== Range of lift ===
The range of lift of different types of hand pumps is given below:

Type	Range
Suction pumps	0–7 meters
Low-lift pumps	0–15 meters
Direct-action pumps	0–15 meters
Intermediate-lift pumps	0–25 meters
High-lift pumps	0–45 meters or more

== Hand pumps and access to clean water ==
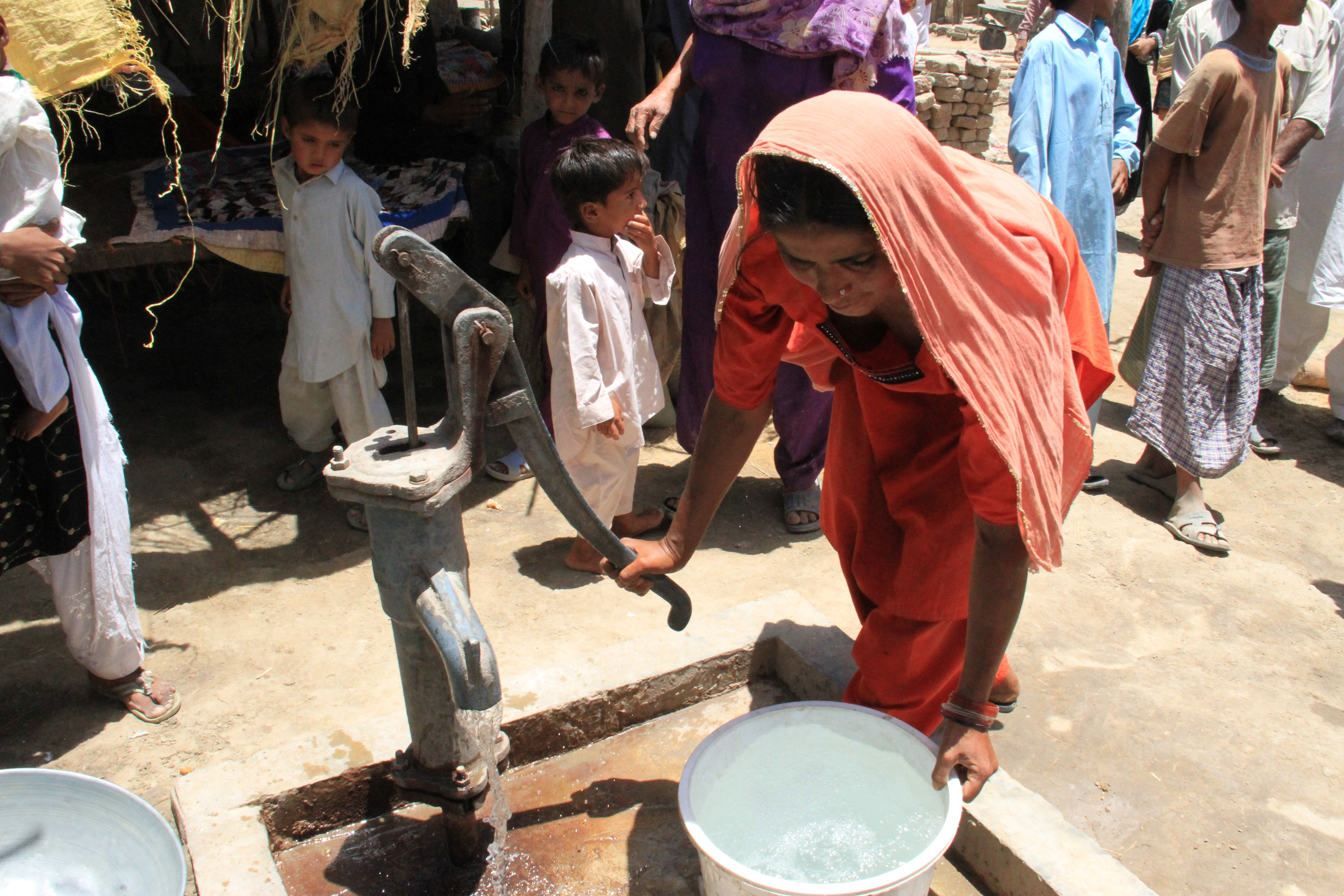
A village pump can provide safe drinking water.

In November 2002, the United Nations Committee on Economic, Social and Cultural Rights asserted that access to clean, safe water goes beyond the classification of water as an economic commodity. The committee stressed the fundamental right of sufficient access to clean water for both domestic and personal use. "The human right to water is indispensable for leading a life in human dignity". With this in mind, manufacturers of water pumps, like those produced by GOAZ Development in Malaysia, have a wide range of potential customers: governments, non-governmental organizations, women's groups, community groups and other organizations of various types interested to developing access to groundwater.

=== Village level operation and maintenance ===
VLOM, meaning Village Level Operation and Maintenance, is a term first used during the UNDP and World Bank Rural Water Supply Hand Pumps Project. This project lasted from 1981 to 1991, and studied the availability and maintenance of hand pump systems. 40 kinds of hand pumps were analyzed in laboratories, and the performance of 2700 hand pumps was analyzed in the field. The study established that centralized maintenance structure was a cause of many problems in hand pump programs, and that maintenance at the village level is best.

The VLOM concept was initially applied to hardware, with the following aims: the possibility of maintenance by village workers, having spare parts manufactured within the country to make sure spare parts are available, endurance in the field, and cost effectiveness. With time, more emphasis was placed on maintenance management. Thus, the "M" came to represent "management of maintenance". Therefore, greater community choice of service, who will service, and financial accountability by the community to the caretakers of the pump have gained more importance within the VLOM concept.

The Swiss Centre Resource Centre and Consultancies for Development, Skat, continues to work on design and support structure for hand pump development as the host of Secretariat of the Rural Water Supply Network (RWSN).

=== Hand pump development projects ===
An example of a Bank funded project that highlights many issues of hand pumps is the 1992 Mali Rural Supply Project. The project brought approximately 230 rural villages inclined towards periods of drought, and 228,000 people access to safe water. The project is notable in its attempt to bring responsibility for the upkeep of the pumps to the villages themselves. The complexity of the pumps is a fundamental problem for all programs of this kind, as well as the quality of the pumps given the heavy demands of a village. A 1994 study, also Bank funded, of the endurance of hand pumps in Africa showed that only 41 to 51 percent of hand pumps were still functioning. The Mali Rural Supply Project did positively affect the longevity of hand pumps by doing the following: establishing local depots of spare parts, training individuals to maintain pumps, scheduling inspections from officials of the project, forming local committees and recruiting volunteers.

Much attention has been given to the benefits of the use of hand pumps in developing nations, as opposed to more traditional methods. In communities reliant on groundwater, through a borehole or well, the use of a bucket and rope system has hygienic issues. The bucket and rope system is not compatible with the use of a cover slab, which can prevent pollution of groundwater. In addition, unwashed hands can contaminate the bucket and rope. Hand pumps avoid these issues and are therefore preferable. However, villagers did not stop using traditional means of gathering water during this project. This was especially true when rain provided villagers with shallow water sources. These shallow wells were often easier to access than the wells with hand pumps. When faced with the option of using near surface water or traveling to the hand pumps, many villagers chose the former.

In addition, animal contamination and the mixing of groundwater and surface water were factors in sub- par sanitation. Another issue that faced the project was that the pumps could only provide a maximum of 20 liters of water per person day, which required an unrealistic staggering of water retrieval. In addition, many depots withdrew support after the donated inventory ran out, the contracts given to consultants eventually closed, and maintenance was not kept up to a high standard. A June 2008 study, conducted by the World Bank, Review of Effectiveness of Rural Water Supply Schemes in India, showed that approximately 45 percent of rural piped water projects focused on breakdown maintenance instead of scheduled maintenance. In addition, about 20% were reported to be in "serious or somewhat serious neglect of maintenance".

=== Hand pump affordability in rural developing areas ===
Whether or not a project to use hand pumps in a developing country is an affordable alternative certainly depends on who or what organization pays the bill. However, the example of a 1992 Ethiopia aid project illustrates what the cost would be for the locals who benefit from the project. This example relates to isolated, rural communities in the rural South.

165 Afridevs hand pumps were imported from India. Each cost approximately US$700, including clearing, transportation and installation. These pumps serve around 55 households each. At that time, the World Bank established that the average per capita income in Ethiopia was $120. A hand pump, first produced by researchers at the University of Waterloo and then refined at the University of Malaya, has been designed with local access to parts in mind. Materials readily available, like a rope covered in chicken fat or leather belt, can be used to ensure maintenance. GOAZ Development sells these pumps from $160 to $300. Therefore, 11% of one's annual income would go towards accessing clean water. This is over twice as much as the 5% that the World Bank stated should be the maximum amount paid by a family.

== Gallery ==
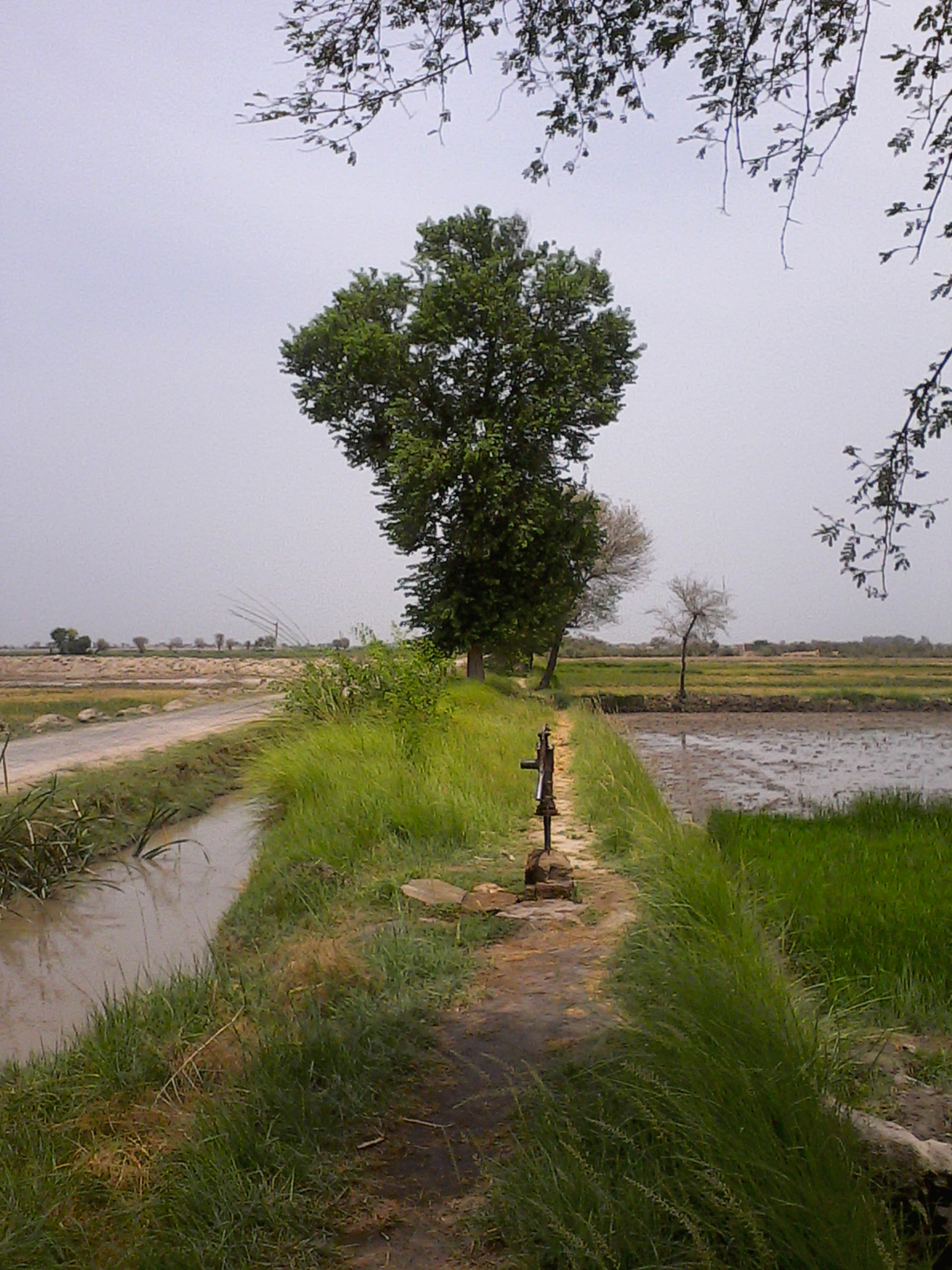
A hand pump in village Bado, near Shikarpur Sindh, Pakistan.

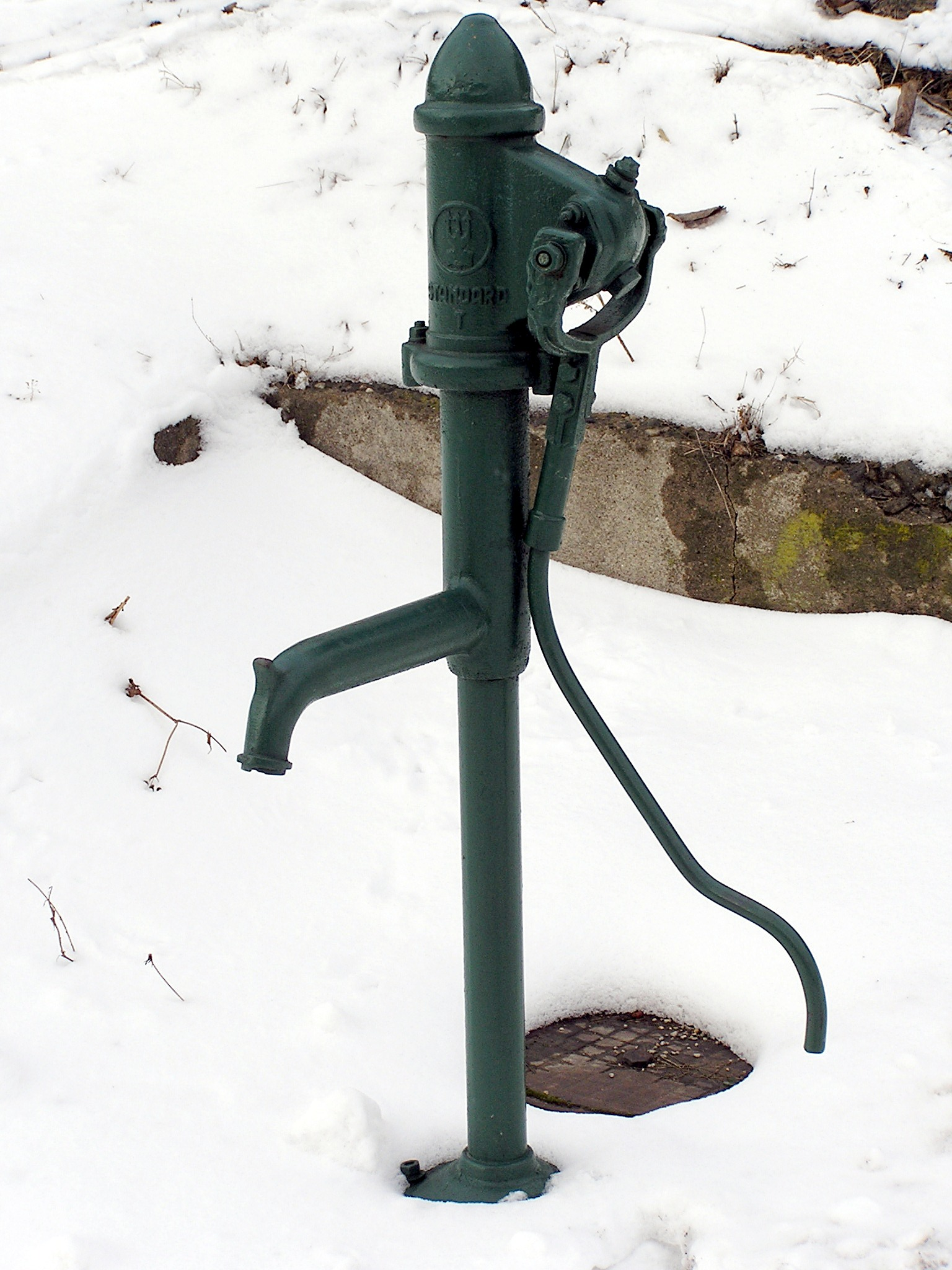
Hand-operated, reciprocating, positive displacement, water pump in Košice-Ťahanovce, Slovakia (walking beam pump).

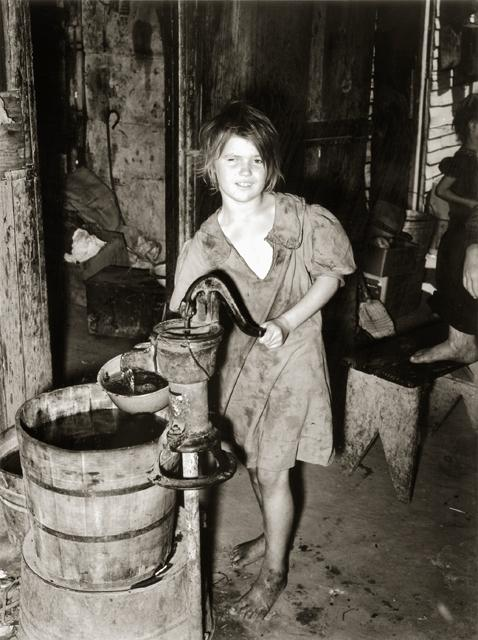
A child drawing water from a hand pump, Oklahoma City, Oklahoma, USA 1939.

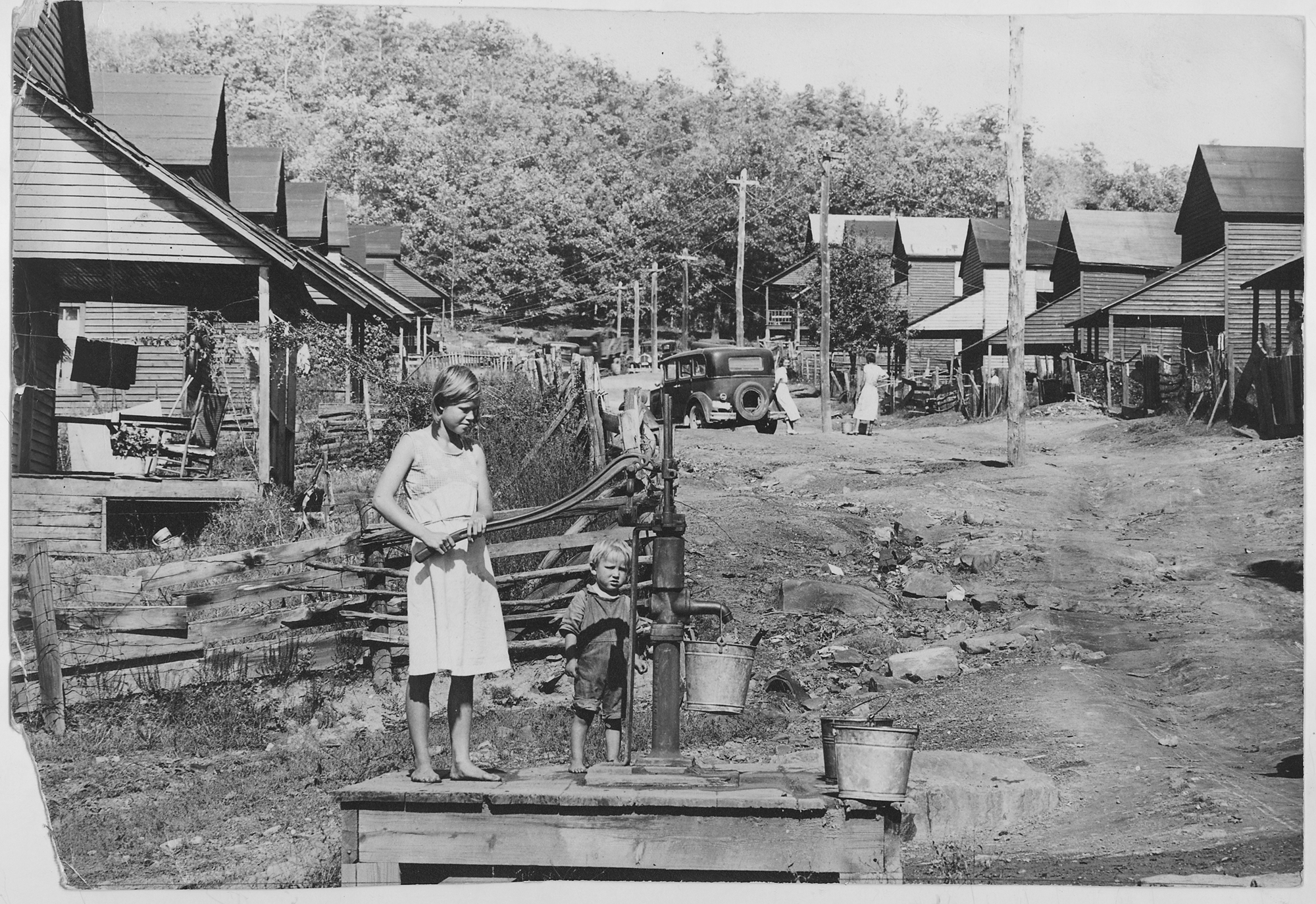
The sole water supply of this section of Wilder, Tennessee, USA 1942.

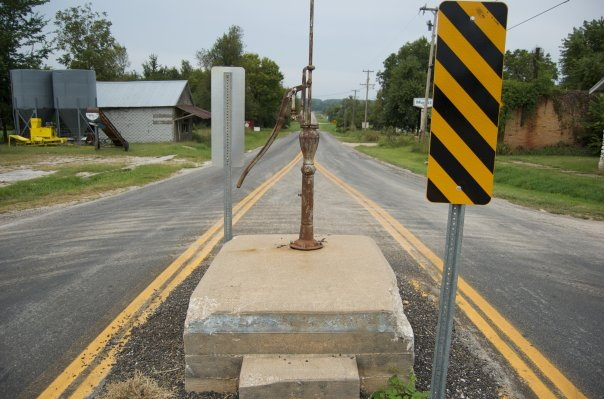
A 1904 community hand pump surviving modern encroachment in 2010 on the middle of Main Street at La Russell, Missouri, USA.

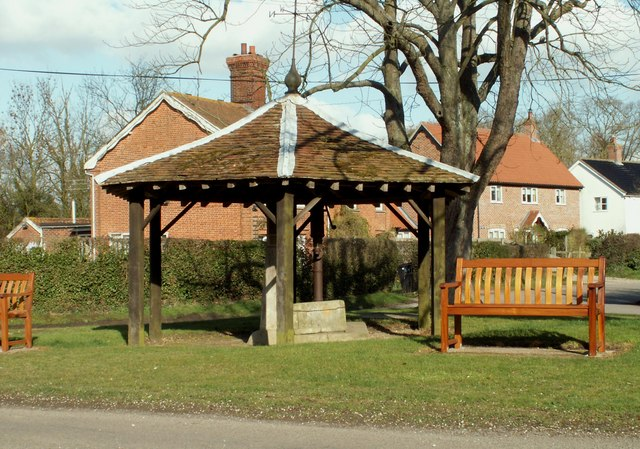
The covered Village Pump in Thorpe Abbots, Norfolk, England

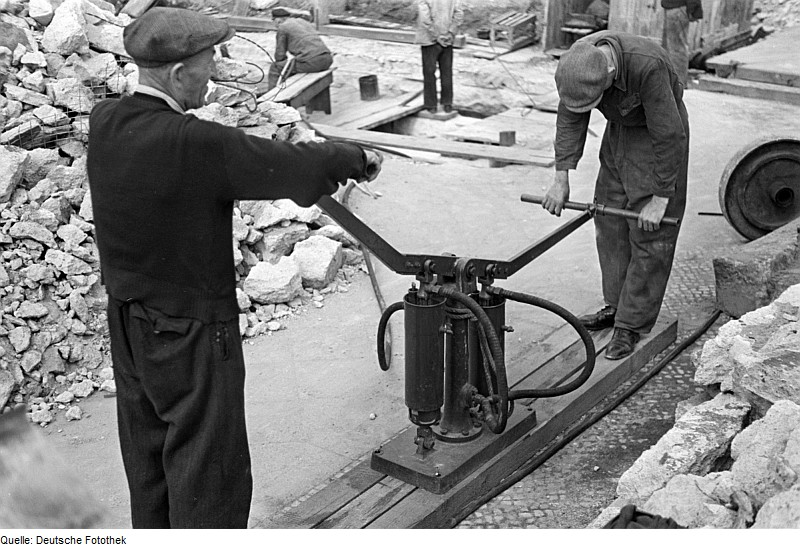
Hand pump in use during reconstruction of Germany after World War II

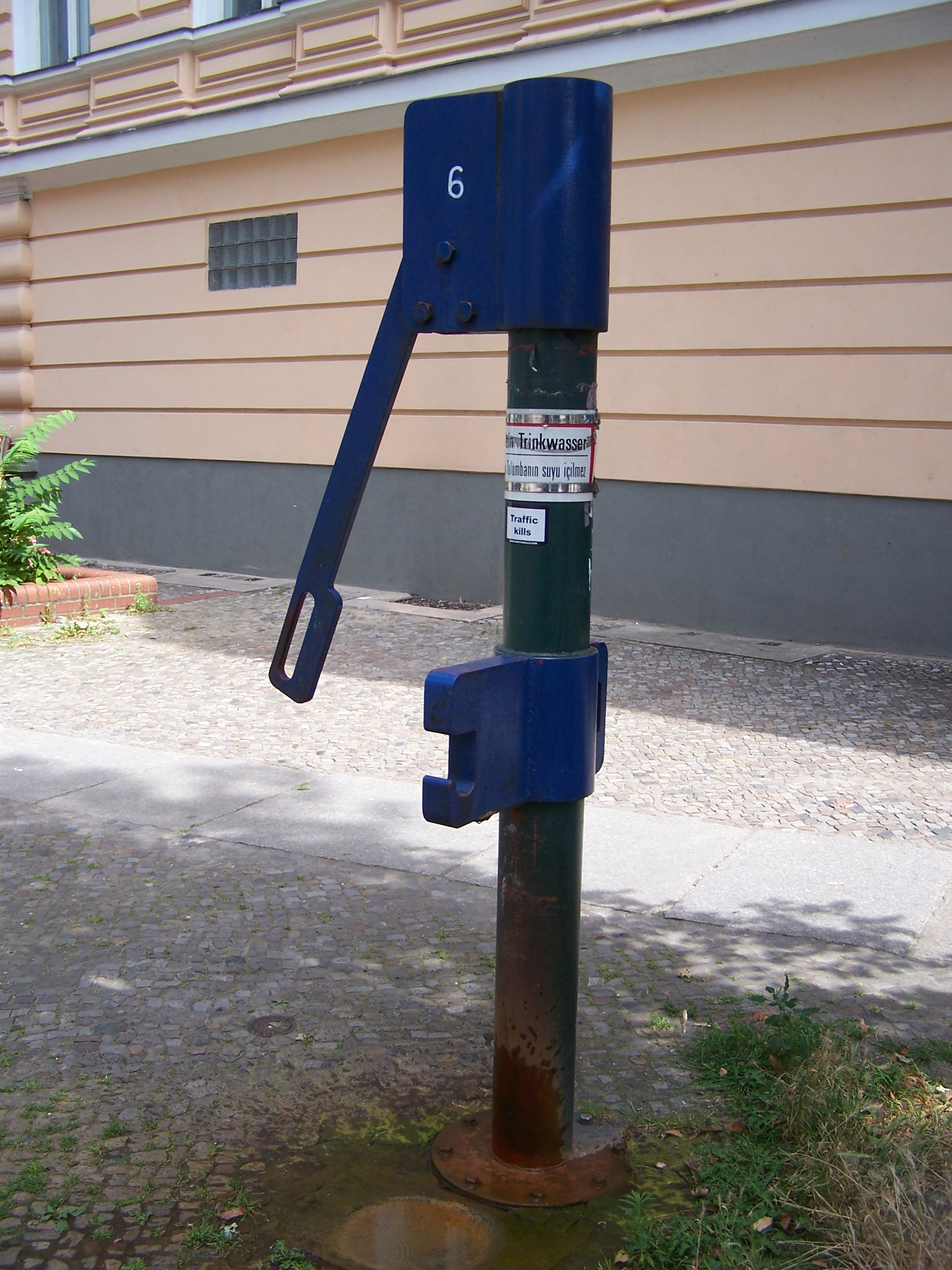
Hand-operated, water pump in Berlin, Germany

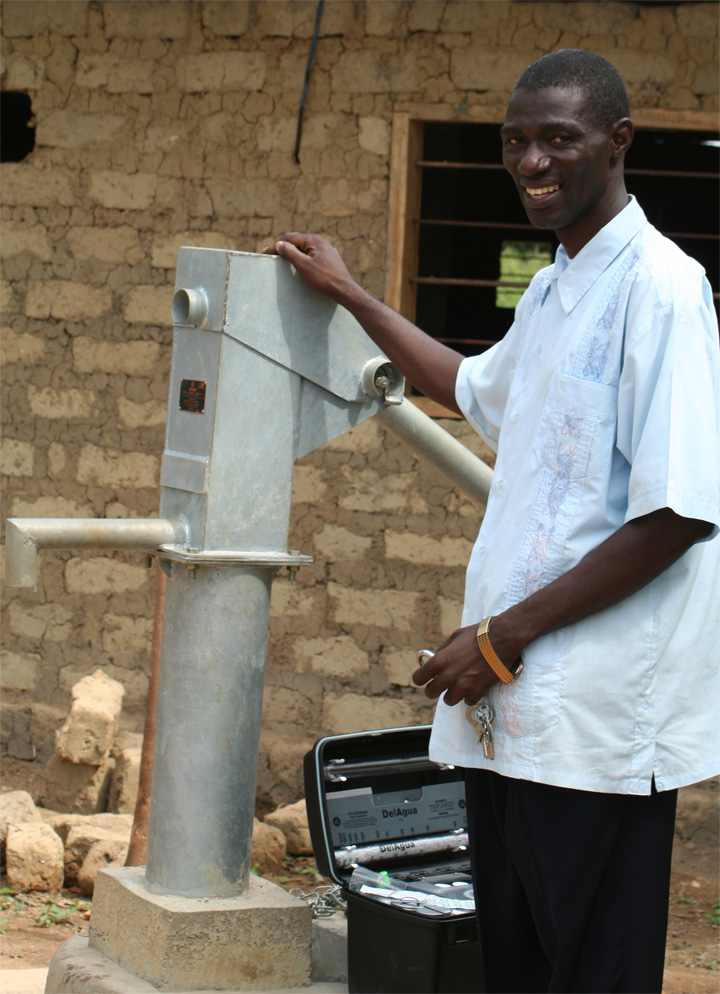
A rural handpump in Liberia.

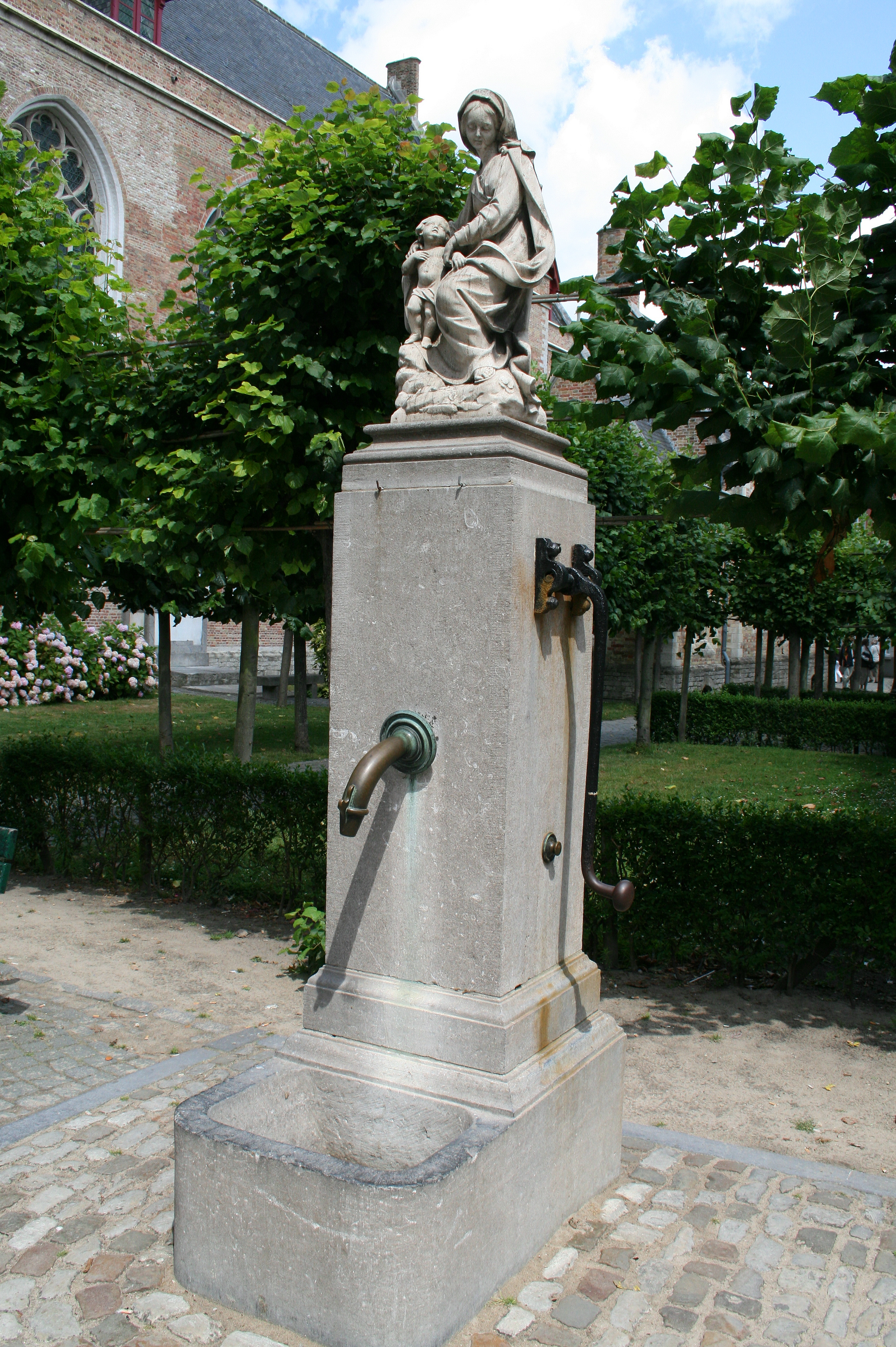
A city handpump in Bruges, Belgium.

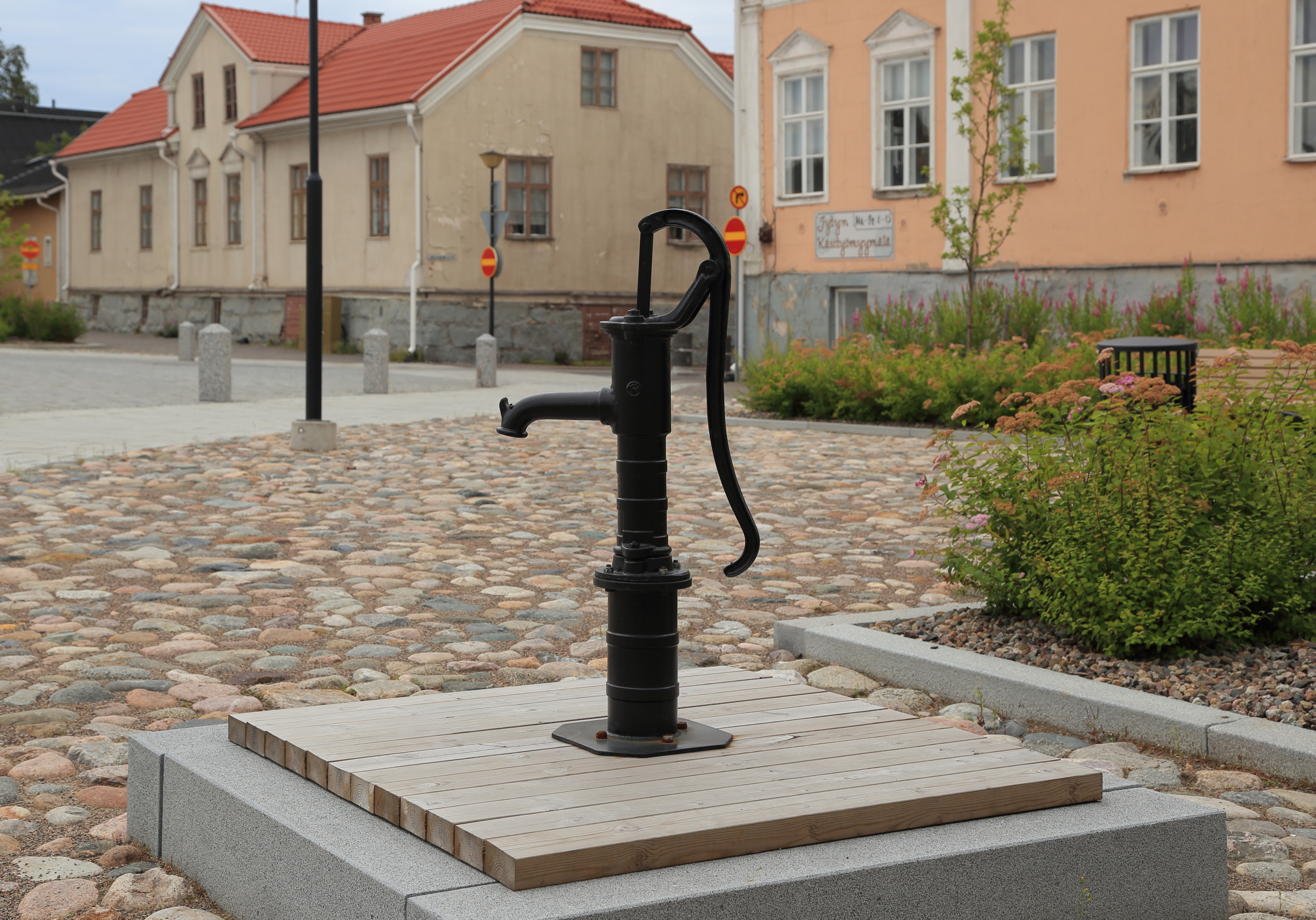
Hand pump in Raahe, Finland

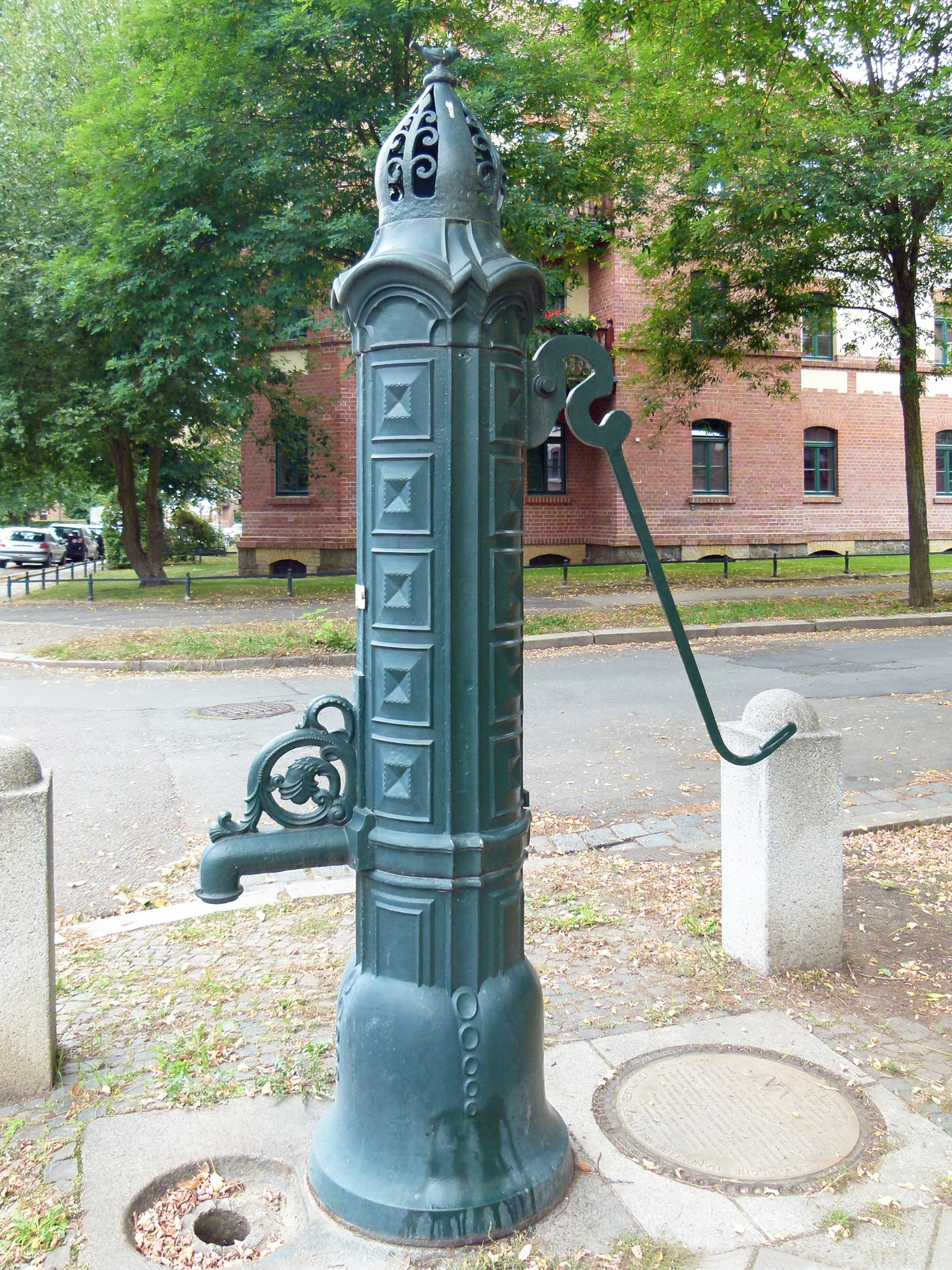
Hand pump in Leipzig, Germany

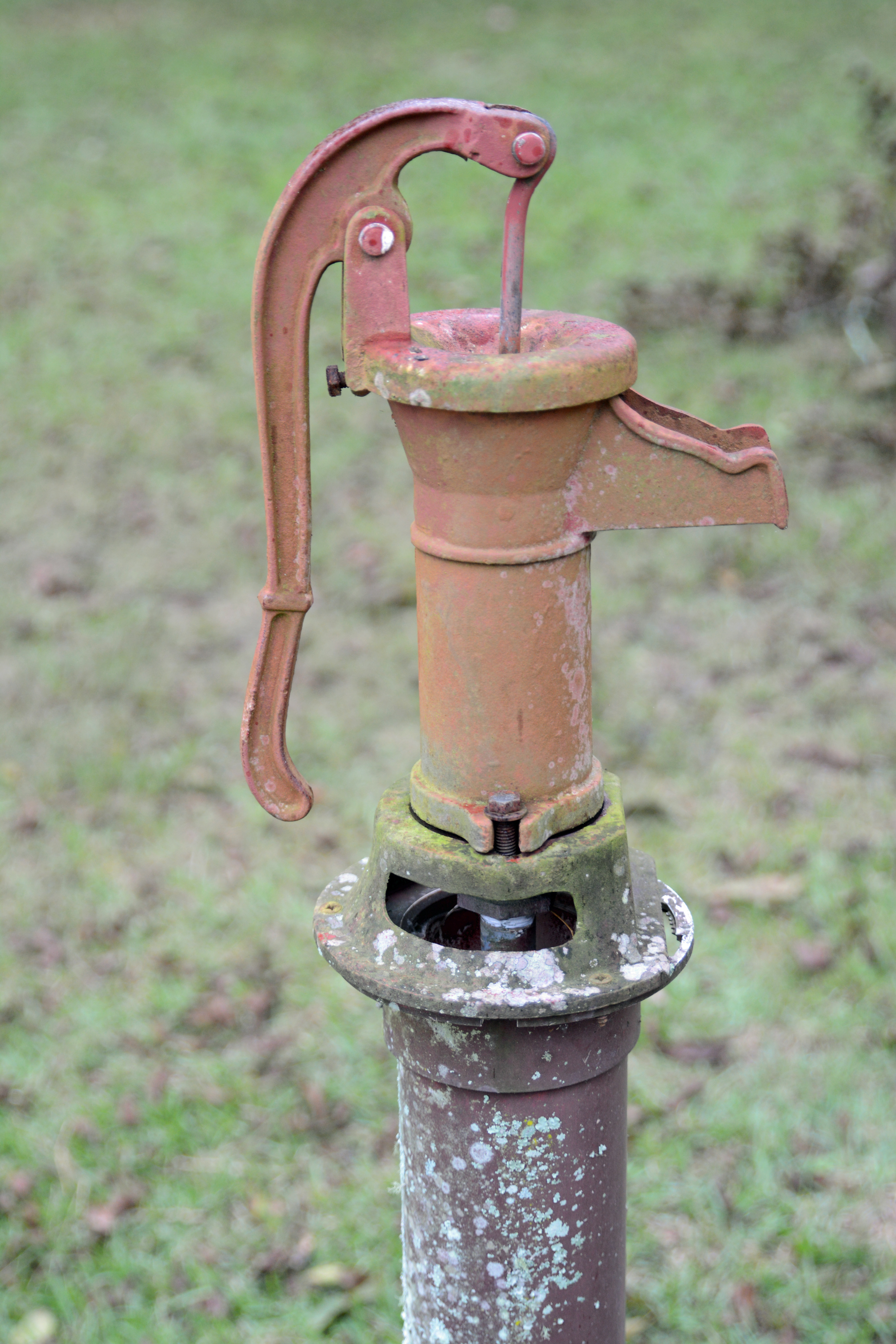
Old hand water pump (c. 1924) at the Colored School in Alapaha, Georgia, US; typical of the period and the area

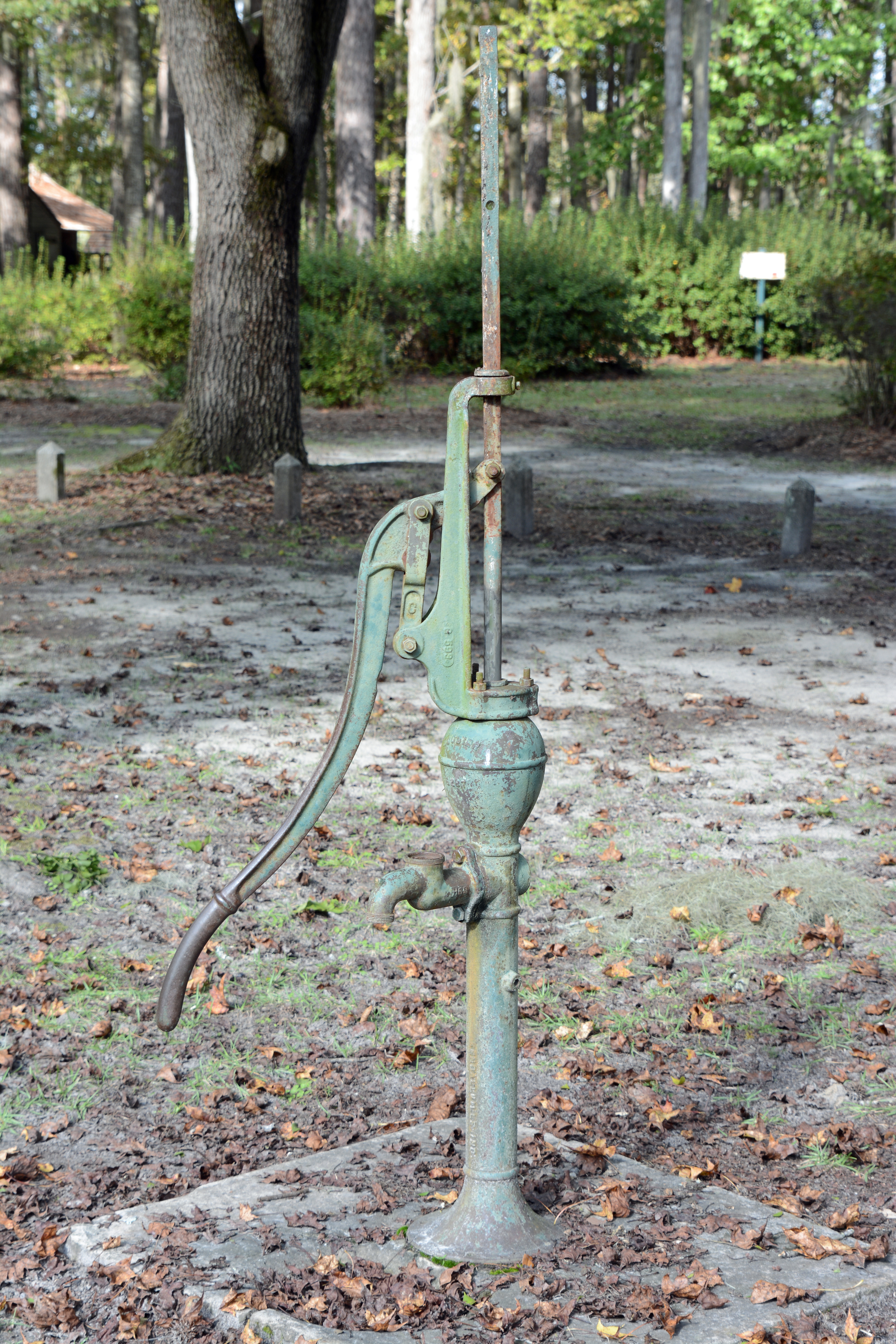
Hand pump at Ebenezer, Georgia, USA

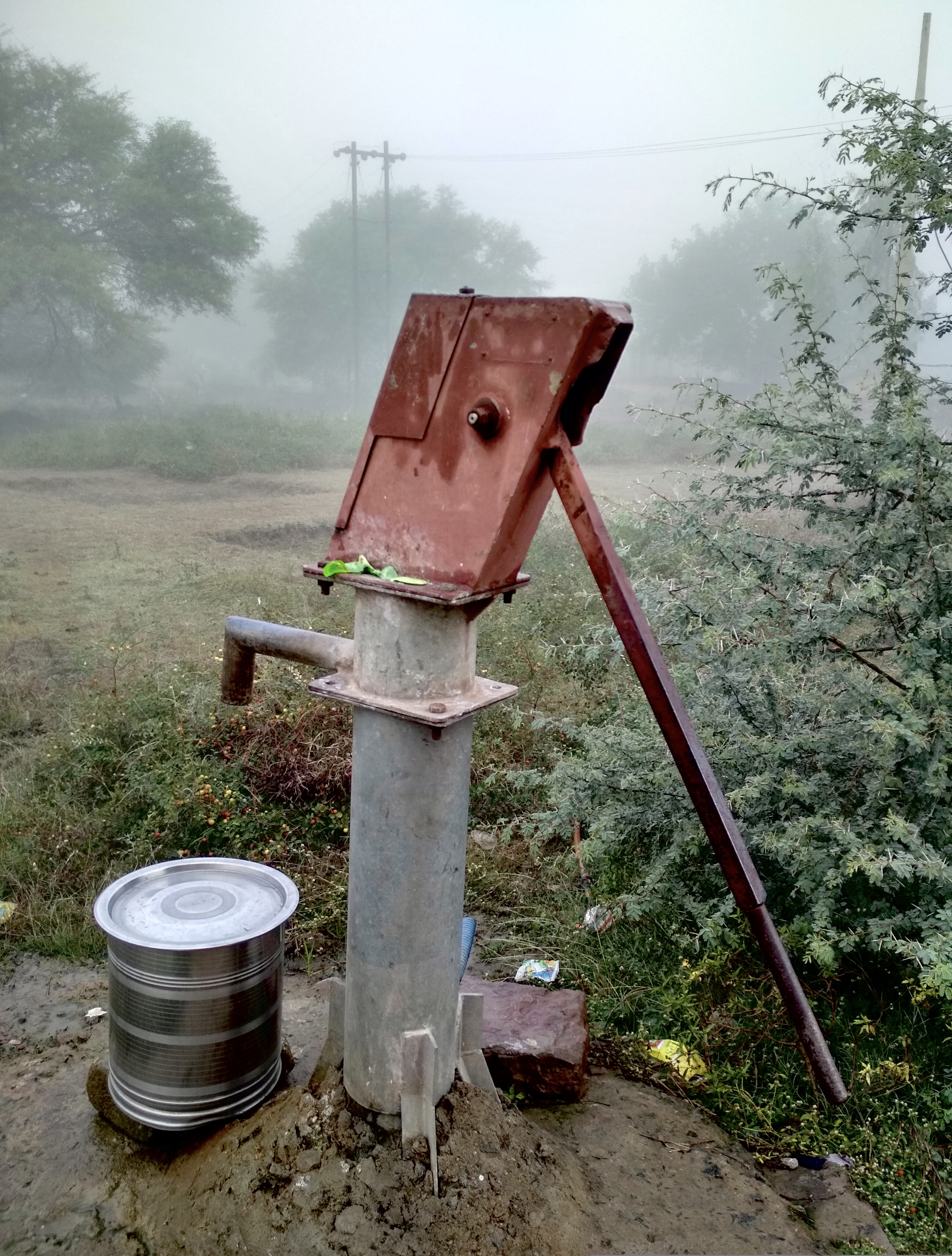
An India Mark II handpump in Bohardih, near Bilaspur, Chhattisgarh, India.

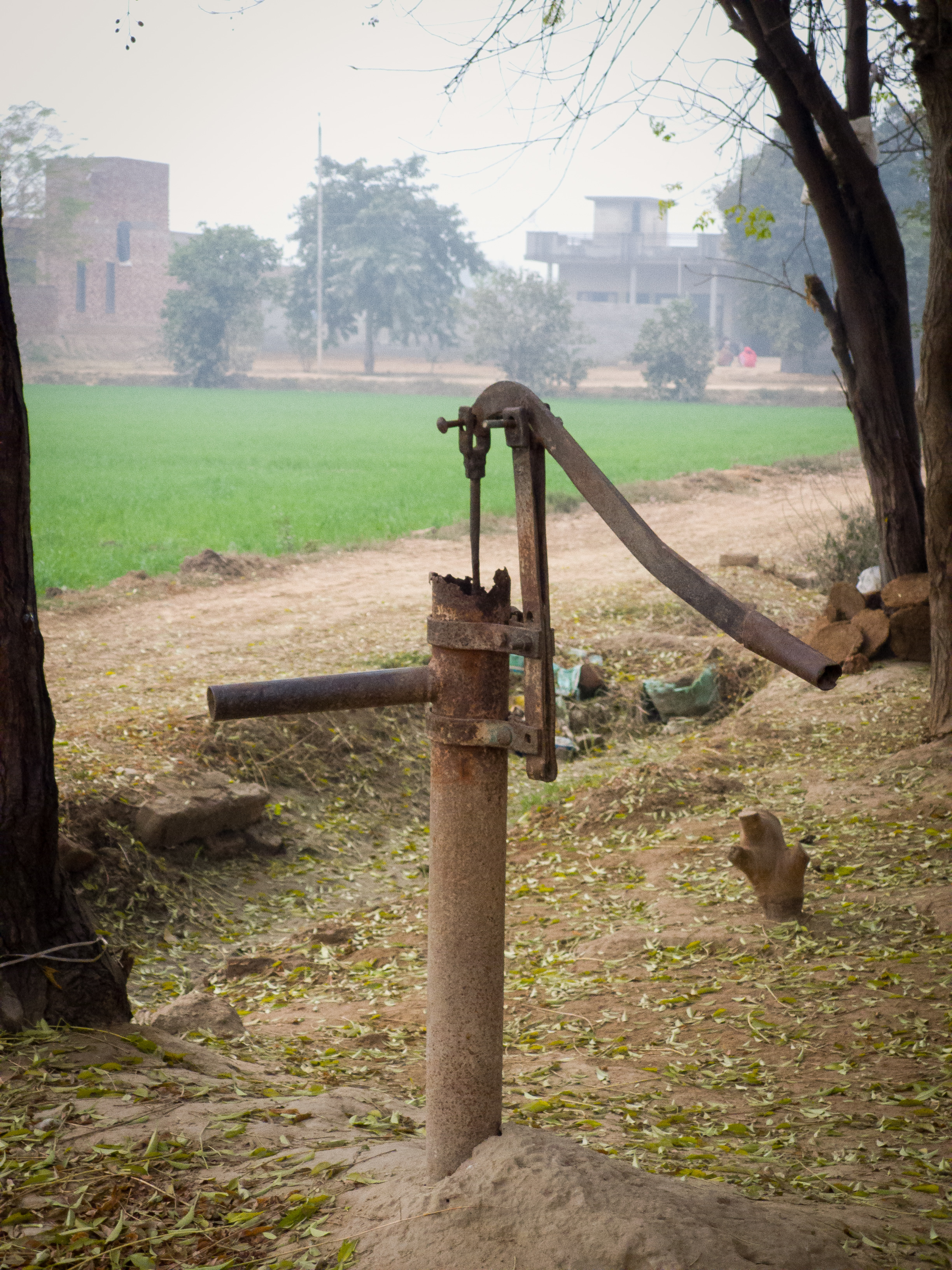
An old hand pump in Burj Bhalaike, Punjab, india

== See also ==
- Ram Pump
- Bush pump
- Drinking water
- India Mark II
- Rope pump
- Treadle pump
- Water supply
- Water well
