= Moviya =

- Village
- Location within Gujarat Location within India
- Coordinates: 21.9153°N 70.8465°E
- Country: India
- State: Gujarat
- District: Rajkot

Government
  - Type: Panchayati Raj
  - Body: Gram Panchayat

Population (2011)
  - Total: 13,000

Languages
  - Official: Gujarati, Hindi and English
- Time zone: UTC+5:30 (IST)
- PIN: 360330
- Vehicle registration: GJ
- Website: http://www.moviya.com/

Moviya is a village located in Rajkot district in the state of Gujarat, India. The village is located at about 42 km from the District, Rajkot. The village follows the Panchayati raj system. The village has undergone transformation under the panchayat. There has been use of advanced technology in education. Efforts have been made for empowerment of women and increasing the security in the village. Some of the facilities provided by the panchayat include local, gutter project, health care centre, banking facility.

== Demographics ==
The population of Moviya was 8000 as per 2001 census of India, which increased to 10,000 in 2011. As of June 2012, the population is 13,000.

== Urbanization ==
There is a 65 KV sub-station that supplies power to the village. The Sarpanch aims at getting Wi-Fi connected to the entire village so that the villagers can use unlimited internet once they purchase the modem from the panchayat office.

The panchayat in this village has made efforts to provide the best possible facilities to students. E-Class and CCTV cameras are installed in the primary schools as well as in the village. Apart from schools, 25 CCTVs are installed at prime junctions of the village so that the litterbugs can be spotted and punished.

Auto Rixa are used for transport purpose within the village.

For communication purpose, 120 waterproof speakers are installed, which are used by the Sarpanch to inform the people of new schemes and to make important announcements.

The total estimate for this development work was ₹14 crore (US$1.5 million), and the state and central governments provided support for the same.

== Education system ==
Education was primarily focused since king of Gondal made it compulsory for all. Literacy level has always been up in all villages of Gondal state.

There are five primary and secondary schools and three high-secondary schools in Moviya. There are three schools that have a hostel facility and own transport bus for village students and neighboring villages' students.

== Water system ==
The panchayat had installed a reverse osmosis plant in 2010 to ensure the supply of clean drinking water to the villagers. During weddings and other ceremonies, water tankers are arranged. Drinking water taps are available for all. The village also has a proper sanitation and drainage system, which is completely underground.
