= Bush pump =

The bush pump, also known as the Zimbabwe bush pump, is a positive displacement pump based on lever action used to extract water from a bore hole well. It is the standard hand pump in Zimbabwe, and is used in Zimbabwe and Namibia. There are approximately 40 000 pumps (2009) in Zimbabwe, and annually about 3000 pumps are installed.

== History ==
The original version was designed in 1933 as a closed-top cylinder pump. Around 1960 the design was modernized. The base of the well was from then on bolted to the well casing. It was at this point the pump got its current name, and this design became the national standard for hand pumps in Zimbabwe. After Zimbabwe’s independence in 1980, the government created its own modernized version of the pump, B-type Zimbabwe Bush Pump. The new pump integrated the features from the earlier pumps. This is the current standard (2009).

The pump is today regarded by many as a national treasure, and was in 1997 pictured on its own postal stamp.

== Technical description ==
As other positive displacement pumps the Bush Pump is constructed around a down-hole cylinder containing a piston, that lifts water with every lever stroke. The pump's signifying feature is the hardwood block that acts as a bearing and its lever mechanism. Besides this, the pump has an untraditional construction where the well base is bolted directly to the top of the well casing, sticking out of the bore hole. It extracts water from a depth up of 18 to 100m, and can support a usage up to 250 people.

== Installation and maintenance ==
The bush pump is easy and inexpensive to build, modify and maintain; still the pump has to be installed by experienced mechanics. Lifting tackles and other special equipment is used to install the component that are inserted into the bore hole. The installation is mostly done by the government of Zimbabwe and different NGOs.

The pump is maintained through a system consisting of three levels of responsibility:

1. At the direct user level, a committee and a caretaker is chosen by the users. They are responsible for minor functional maintenance, for instance oiling the pump and tightening bolts.

2. At the ward level there is a trained pump mechanic who repairs broken pumps, and keeps maintenance records.

3. At the district level a water supply operative is in charge of larger maintenance operations, and has access to vehicles and equipment for transporting larger pump components.

== Analysis ==
The bush pump has been the subject of scholarly studies. In their article, “The Zimbabwe Bush Pump: Mechanics of a Fluid Technology", Marianne de Laet and Annemarie Mol analyze the pumps role as an appropriate technology. They focus on the fluidity of the pump, meaning its flexibility both when it comes to how it was invented, how it is used, and what function it has. They make their case by showing that the pump was not invented by one human actor (the opposite of what they call heroic actorship), but through a slow process of fluid actorship, where there is not one clear human creator. The use of the pump is also fluid, it does not only give water to a community, but the construction of the pump can serve an important ceremonial function both locally and nationally. The pump can also be said to be fluid in how it reacts to decay. Even if seemingly essential parts of it mechanics is broken; it can serve functions not intended by any of its creators. The pump is not only its physical appearance or its technical description, Laet and Mol argues:

The first aspect of the pump’s fluidity is that its boundaries are not solid and sharp. The Pump is a mechanical object, it is a hydraulic system, but it is also a device installed by the community, a health promoter and a nation-building apparatus. It has each of these identities – and each comes with its own different boundaries. ... In each of its identities the Bush Pump contains a variant of its environment.

Laet and Mol argue that their way of analyzing the bush pump can be helpful when trying to understand a wide variety of objects and practices.

== See also ==
- Appropriate technology
- Drinking water
- Hand pump
- Pump
