= Friends of the African Union =

FAU
- Friends of the African Union
- Founded: January 16, 2012
- Headquarters: Cincinnati, Ohio
- Location: United States
- Key people: Hershel Daniels Jr., Chairman
- Affiliations: North American African Diaspora Unity Council
- Website: friendsoftheafricanunion.com

Friends of the African Union (FAU) is an economic, social, humanitarian, charitable, educational and civil society organization founded to work for the benefit of the African Union and the African diaspora in their host countries.

FAU has developed programs with allied companies to supply metropolitan, regional and site-specific sewers, water systems, power, communications, computing, gas, and trash solutions along with urban planning services, architectural design, and multi-disciplinary engineering services for members of the African Union, the African diaspora and its allies. FAU will work with the allied peoples of the African American diaspora, non-governmental organizations and governments of the world who support the African Union and the people of the African diaspora.

== African Union ==
The African Union (AU) is a union of all 55 African states. Established on 9 July 2002, the AU was formed as a successor to the Organisation of African Unity (OAU). The most important decisions of the AU are made by the Assembly of the African Union, a semi-annual meeting of the heads of state and government of its member states. The AU's secretariat (the African Union Commission) is based in Addis Ababa, Ethiopia.

== FAU mandate ==
The FAU is mandated via its United Nations Civil Society Non-governmental organization (NGO) joint venture of September 15, 2014 to:

- Promote dialogue between all segments of the African people on issues concerning the continent and its future
- Forge partnerships between governments and all segments of civil society (especially women, youth, children of the diaspora, organized labor, the private sector and professional groups)
- Promote the participation of Africa's (and the diaspora's) civil society in the implementation of the policies and programmes of the AU and the FAU
- Support policies and programmes promoting peace, security and stability, and foster continental development and integration with the African diaspora
- Promote and defend a culture of good governance, democratic principles and institutions, popular participation, human rights and social justice
- Promote, advocate and defend a culture of gender equality
- Promote and strengthen the institutional, human and operational capacities of African civil society
- Create a new economic framework between the people of the African Union and those of the African diaspora

== FAU Functions ==
As an advisory group, the FAU's functions are to:

- Contribute (through advice) to the effective translation of the objectives, principles and policies of the AU into concrete programmes and to evaluate of these programmes
- Undertake studies recommended (or deemed necessary) by organs of the AU or the FAU and submit recommendations accordingly
- Carry out other studies deemed necessary and submit recommendations as appropriate
- Contribute to the popularization, participation, sharing of best practices and expertise and realization of the vision and objectives of the AU
- Contribute to the promotion of human rights according to the Universal Declaration of Human Rights, the rule of law, good governance, democratic principles, gender equality and children's rights
- Promote and support efforts of institutions engaged in review of the future of Africa and forge Pan-African values to enhance an African society and way of life based on the International Organization for Standardization 26000 model
- Foster and consolidate partnership between the AU (through the FAU) and allied NGOs through public education, mobilization and feedback on the activities of the AU and the needs of the African diaspora
- Assume other functions as referred to it by the AU

== FAU Operational Principals ==
Friends of the African Union Operational Principles adopted by the Friends of the African Union on November 19, 2012.

- We support the African Union [AU], it's constitutive act and the history of the predecessor organization the Organisation of African Unity [OAU].
- We support the recognition of the African Diaspora globally and legally by the AU.
- We support the UN Universal Declaration of Human Rights and its application to Africans and their condition worldwide.
- We support the UN Millennium Development Goals for Africa and the economic-social uplift of Africans on the continent and in the African Diaspora as well work of the African Union in regards to increasing trade between African Nations and will incorporate the work of the International Year for People of African Descent [2011] as it was designated by the UN and Organization of American States.
- We support the strategy and agenda of the Economic, Social and Cultural Council (ECOSOCC) and through organization of African American Civil Society we support the legacy projects and continuing efforts to strengthen the Global African Diaspora Initiative of the AU.
- We support Peace, Security and basic human dignity within Africa and around the globe, with an emphasis on stopping slavery in the AU and the African Diaspora.
- We support the organization of African and peoples of African descent self-interest and uplift through a committee structure and take responsibility for organizing such in the United States of America.
- We support the African Growth and Opportunity Act (AGOA) of 2000 and by 2014 the creation of a new plan between the United States of America and the African Union that is supportive of the African Diaspora in the US and would be sustainable not only in Africa but also in the host countries of the African Diaspora.
- We support political empowerment of Africans as individual citizens and in free associations on cooperation and solidarity in the continent and in Diaspora.
- We support the creation of the African American Diaspora Holding Company & Investment Trust who will start with creating a financial solution in response to the damage caused by Hurricane Sandy through the US Federal Reserve and its banks.

== Diaspora representation proposal ==
On the 49th Africa Day (May 25, 2012), the FAU proposed that members of the African Diaspora in the United States of America have four votes in the Economic, Social and Cultural Council (ECOSOCC), an AU organization. At its inauguration in Durban, South Africa in July 2002, the African Union embarked on a course to transform and integrate the continent. The aims and hopes of the AU were a response to calls for democracy and development from Africa's NGOs. The continent's leaders were determined to build a union which was people-oriented.

Aware of the rich and diverse human and institutional resources at the grass roots level, the new union would be devoted to building strong partnerships between governments and all segments of society. The AU did not wish to organize civil society; rather, the ECOSOCC's organizing principle is one in which civil society would organize itself to work with the AU.

Since the launch of ECOSOCC's Permanent General Assembly in 2008, its challenge is to build its own institutions and establish a format for partnering with other groups as it performs its function of providing advisory opinions to the AU. These are the issues which engage ECOSOCC as a young institution of the African Union.
