= Village-level operation and maintenance (pumps) =

Village Level Operation and Maintenance (VLOM) is an unofficial classification given to hand pumps used in developing countries that require minimal maintenance or that can be done at the village level. Not all maintenance and repair needs to be done by the villagers for a pump to be classed as a VLOM pump. Village Level Operation and Management of Maintenance is often used synonymously. This addition emphasizes the role of users as the managers of maintenance able choose to use someone from outside the village to assist with more complicated repairs.

== History ==
During the first UN decade on water boreholes, hand-dug wells and tubewells were constructed and water pumps were provided to developing countries by various NGOs. Unfortunately, this top-down approach led to the installation of pumps, notably the India Mark II, that were difficult to maintain. VLOM pumps were designed to allow remote villages to maintain pumps themselves as part of a larger strategy to reduce the dependency of villages on government and donor agencies and provide more sustainable access to drinking water.

== Common VLOM Pumps ==
VLOM Pumps	India Mark III	Afridev	BluePump
Cost	$600	$600	$2,200
Description	Successor to the India Mark II. Repairs to the cylinder valves can be done without lifting the riser main.	Quick release Eye & Hook tool-less ends on Connecting Rods with rubber centralizers facilitate maintenance and protect the riser pipe against internal wear. All the specifications of the pump are controlled by SKAT and the specifications have undergone 5 Revisions	Maintenance free pump system without rubber seals in the cylinder. The BluePump design is owned and hosted by the FairWater Foundation who supervises the production and monitoring the performance in the field. FairWater has an active R&D program to update and improve the design whenever needed.
Riser Main	65mm	65mm	ID70/OD80mm
Max Depth (meters)	50	40	100

== Implementation ==
The concept of Village Level Operation and Maintenance Management in relation to communal handpumps has gained wide acceptance in the rural water sector. Project and pump designs based on VLOM principles are now commonplace. However, implementation of handpump programs in accordance with VLOM criteria have been only partially successful and the VLOM approach to maintenance has been very difficult to realize in the field, especially in Africa.

It was assumed that the private sector would take care of the distribution of spare parts, but most parts had to be imported and were difficult to get. Low profit margins on spares did not encourage the private sector to take up the role of importing and distributing spare parts. As a result, VLOM technology is increasingly seen as one amongst many components needed for the sustainable provision of village water supplies.

Difficulties with the introduction of VLOM have called into question a number of inherent assumptions in the concept relating to the user community, the supporting environment and technology choice. Of particular importance is the assumption that introducing and supporting VLOM is an easier task for government than running a centralized maintenance service.

VLOM has helped with sustainability, but issues remain regarding maintenance. There are no ‘off-the-shelf’ solutions which can bypass the need for effective government institutional community water point support. Wherever this problem is unresolved, and where there are no NGOs or other agencies to fill the gap, sustainability will always be in doubt if there is no government, or if the government fails to provide basic essential services to the population.

Recently there have been attempts to involve the private sector, not only in selling spares and handpump repairs, but also in local pump sales and installation. This is called the "BlueZone" approach where a handpump dealer has its own region to take care of. Due to economies of scale, this would raise a more interesting business case and keep the handpump dealer interested to maintain this service while the communities have a reliable source of water with a local back-up. There is no simple solution on the horizon for sub-Saharan Africa.
