= India Mark II =

Water handpump

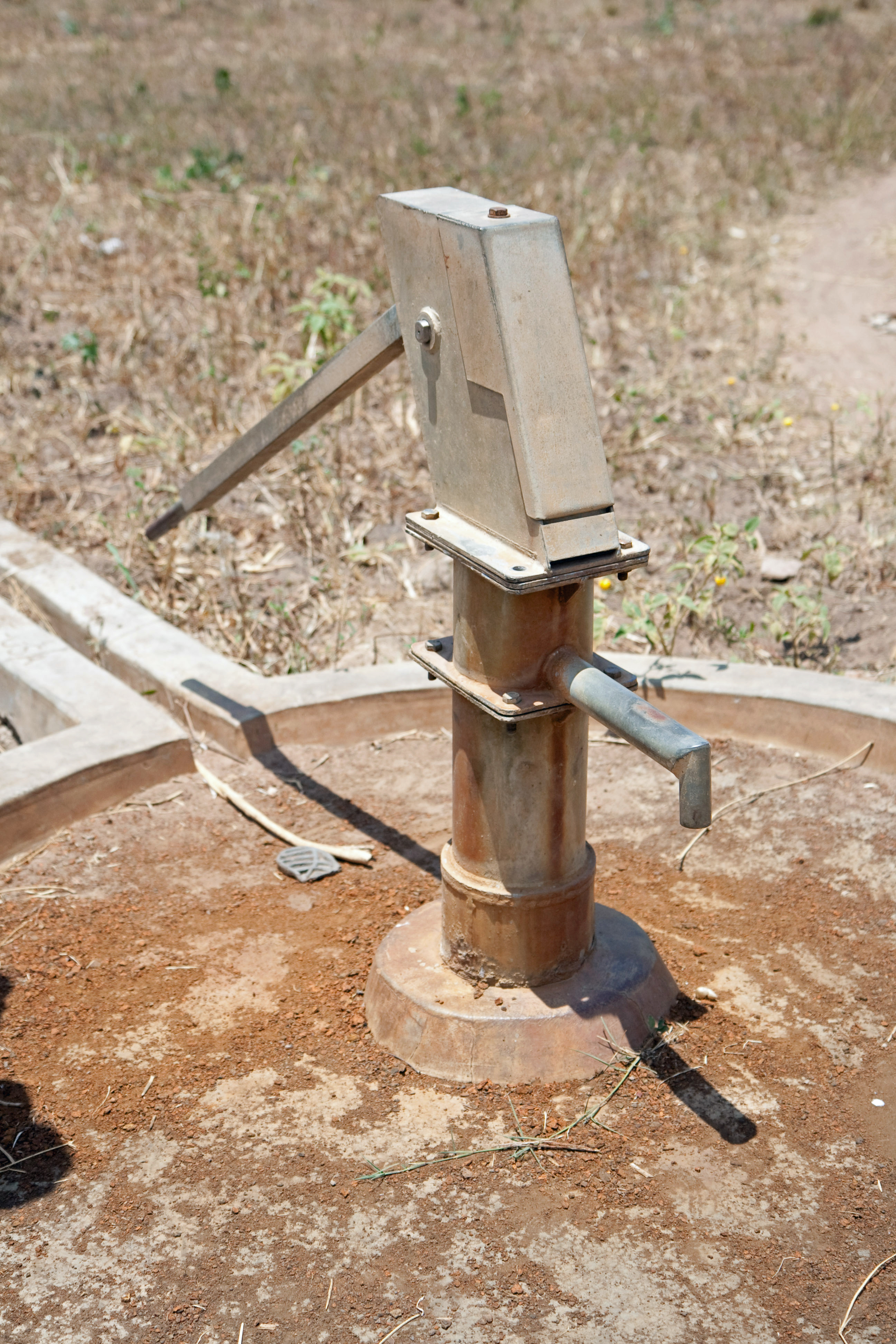
A broken India Mark II pump in rural Uganda

A busy Mark II pump in Uganda. Children often bear the responsibility for collecting water. Durability needs to be incorporated into pump design to the handle the heavy use (and abuse).

The India Mark II is a human-powered pump designed to lift water from a depth of 50–80 m. The Mark II is the world's most widely used water handpump. The pump was designed in the 1970s to serve village water needs in developing countries and rural areas. The pump is installed on top of a drilled well or borehole and lifts water from the bottom of the well through repeatedly moving the pump handle up and down. Several manufacturers, primarily in India, manufacture the pump which now falls under public domain. By the mid-1990s, five million of the pumps had been manufactured and installed. India Mark ll Pumps' bored hole may be fitted with solar thermal siphon pump to run on solar energy. The resulting assembly may be called the India Mark IV Solar Pump.

== History ==
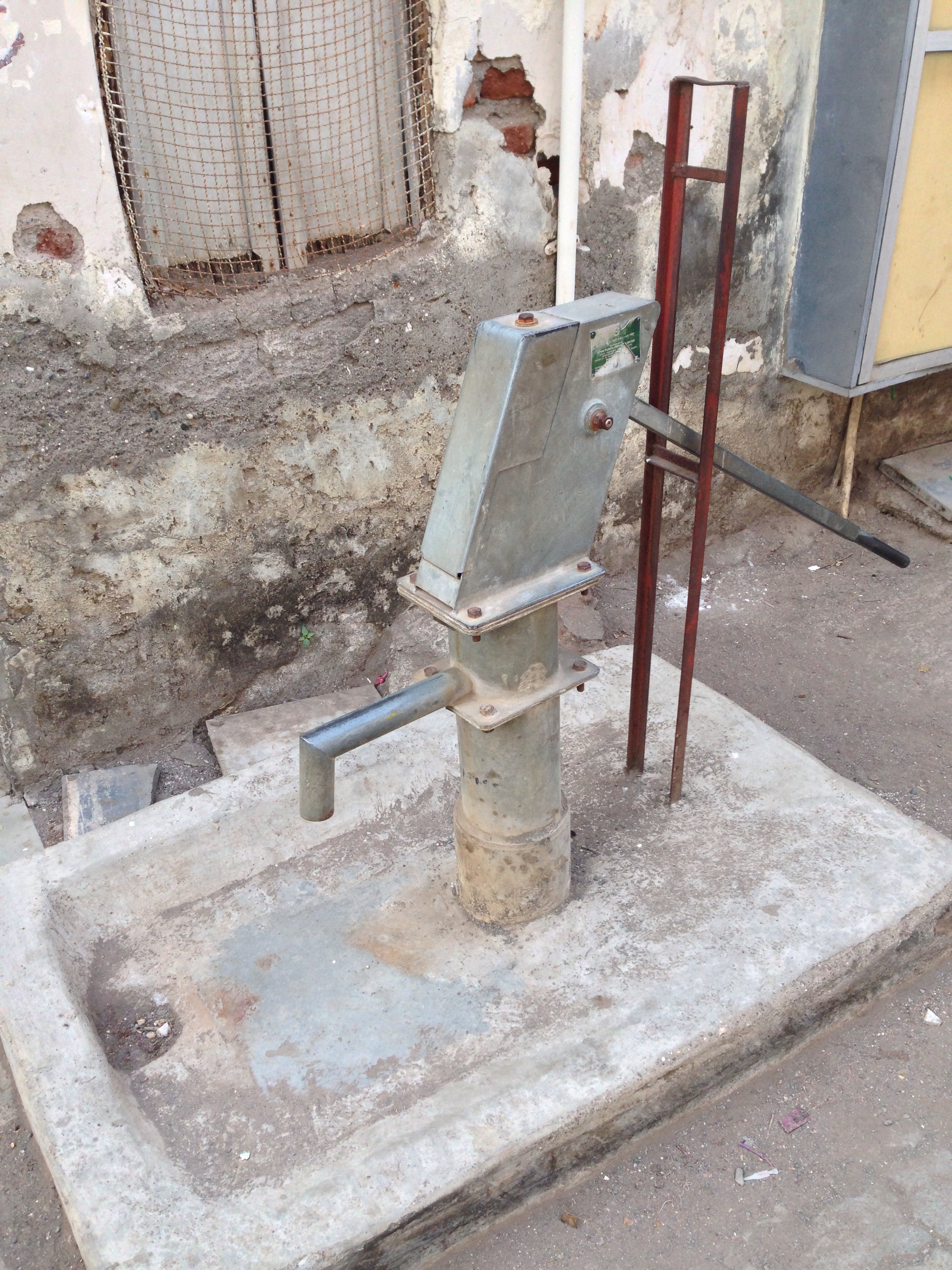
A typical Mark II hand pump in India.

The pump was designed in the 1970s in a joint effort between the Government of India, UNICEF, and The World Health Organization (WHO) to address the severe drought and a water shortage affecting India during that period and to prevent evacuation of villages to refugee camps. Prior to the pump's design, poor quality cast-iron replicas of pumps used in Europe and North America to support a single family were used. While these types of pumps in the US might have been used by a farming family three or four times a day, those in India were used incessantly by an entire community, with women and children lining up to use each pump from dawn till dusk. Not surprisingly, the pumps frequently broke down. When UNICEF did a survey of boreholes and pumps in two Indian states, it found that 75 per cent of the pumps were out of action. The requirements for the pump included the need for a design simple enough to be manufactured in unsophisticated workshops, easy to maintain, and costing no more than US$200 (in 1970s dollars). The Mark II was based on the Sholapur pump, the most durable pump at that time, designed by Swedish volunteer, engineer, and inventor Oscar Carlsson of the Sholapur Well Service, operating under the Mission Covenant Church of Sweden and the Hindustani Covenant Church of India. In just 20 years, 1 million of the pumps had been manufactured and installed in the developing world. An Indian magazine listed India Mark II hand pump as one of the defining inventions of the country.

== Mechanics ==
The pump's primary components consist of the pump handle, the riser main which carries the water to the surface, the pump cylinder which pushes water up the riser main, and the connecting rod which connects the pump handle to the pump cylinder at the bottom of the well. After a borehole is drilled, a well casing is inserted into the hole to prevent the erosion of the borehole walls. The India Mark II needs a borehole with a minimum diameter of 10 cm. The casing has a well screen to allow water to pass into the casing but keeps rocks and dirt out. A pump cylinder is attached to the bottom of a series of pipes call riser mains or riser pipes and sits below the water surface in the well once installed. The riser main will carry the water from the pump cylinder to the surface. Inside the riser main, a series of rods connect the pump handle to the top of the pump cylinder at the bottom of the well. The reciprocating up and down movement of the pump handle raises and lowers the connecting rod thus raising and lowering the plunger of the pump cylinder. Two one-way water valves inside the cylinder suck water into the cylinder on the upstroke and force the water into the riser main on the down stroke. Water flows up the riser main and out of the spout at the top of the well head assembly.

== Reliability ==
While the pump performance is much better than the European designed family pumps that were installed prior to this new design, the India Mark II has several flaws. Many versions of the pump use galvanized steel riser mains (the pipe that carries water from the bottom of the borehole to the surface). These pipes rust quickly (sometimes in just 2 years), and either leak water or separate completely from the pump rendering it useless. The pump requires routine maintenance and will fall into disrepair if certain procedures are not followed. A pump cylinder rests at the bottom of the borehole and may needs to be replaced every two years. To remove the cylinder, the riser main also needs to be lifted from the borehole. As one can imagine, lifting up to 100 ft of iron pipe and cylinder from a well is no easy task and requires special tools, a tripod stand, the replacement parts, and most importantly, the know-how to do it. In many developing countries and remote villages, these requirements cannot be met and the pumps often remain broken. Longer lasting materials can be retrofitted to the India Mark II. PVC riser mains are less expensive and can last longer. PVC is much lighter, easier to work with and significantly reduce the cost of ownership of the well. PVC has had its own set of issues. In deeper wells, the pumping action can flex the PVC and cause cracking. The connecting rods can also wear through the PVC if the rods are not centred in the riser main. Riser main stabilizer and connecting rod centralizers can be used to prevent this type of wear. Ministry of water officials have pushed back on the using of PVC citing the materials have not been tested thoroughly, though several countries have been using PVC successfully for years. Government corruption may be at the root of the decision. Iron replacement pipes are often paid for by the NGO. The sellers of the pipes are often the ministry members themselves, family or close friends.

== Future of the India Mark II ==
Major criticism of the India Mark II is that its design makes it difficult to repair at the village level and hence, without government support, NGO intervention, or community savings systems in place, the pump is more susceptible to extended periods of non-function or permanent failure.

Lower upfront hardware costs and widespread adoption of the Mark II pump makes replacement parts more accessible. Unfortunately, higher maintenance costs and frequency of parts that need to be replaced can make the pump financially unsustainable in a poor community.

More reliable pumps have been developed to be maintained at the local level: village level operations and maintenance (VLOM). The India Mark III, Afridev, and Bluepump are the most common VLOM pumps. The pumps incorporate the use of larger PVC riser mains to allow for the pump cylinder to be removed without lifting the rising main out of the borehole. This makes maintenance on the pumps easier but the initial cost for the pipes can be twice as much. Routine maintenance is still required and maintaining funds for replacement parts is still necessary. Without the need for a specialized pump mechanic these newer pump designs can provide longer lasting sustainable access to drinking water. Unfortunately, some countries have restricted importation and installation of these pumps citing the need to standardize pumps to reduce cost and ensure an adequate supply of replacement parts. The government of Uganda, for example, enforces the standardization by placing high tariffs on pumps other than a variant of the India Mark II, known as U2.

== Technical Information ==
- Maximum operating depths: 80 m (262,5 feet).
- Minimum Borehole Size 100 mm
- Stroke Length 125 mm
- Cylinder setting depth range 9–45 mm
- Discharge per stroke 0.40 L
- Discharge per hour 0.8 m^{3}

The India Mark II is a Public Domain design handpump. The international design is maintained by the Rural Water Supply Network (RWSN):

- India Mark II
- India Mark II, Extra Deepwell
- India Mark III
- U3M

however India, Ghana (Ghana Modified) and Uganda (U2, U3, U3M) have their own national standards for the India Mark II and its variants.
