= Elaeophora elaphi =

Scientific classification
- Domain: Eukaryota
- Kingdom: Animalia
- Phylum: Nematoda
- Class: Chromadorea
- Order: Rhabditida
- Family: Onchocercidae
- Genus: Elaeophora
- Species: E. elaphi

Binomial name
- Elaeophora elaphi Hernandez-Rodriguez, Martinez-Gomez & Gutierrez-Palomino, 1986

Species of roundworm

Elaeophora elaphi is a nematode parasite found in the blood vessels of the liver in Red Deer (Cervus elaphus) in certain parts of Spain. The adult male measures 77 mm long and 549 μm wide, adult females are 91–109 mm long and 793-1049 μm wide, and microfilariae (in utero) are 225 μm long. Though adult E. elaphi induce lesions in the blood vessels, and appear to activate the local immune response, they seldom cause overt clinical symptoms in their hosts.

== Discovery and nomenclature ==
Elaeophora elaphi was first described in 1986, from specimens found in the hepatic blood vessels of Red deer (Cervus elaphus) from "Sierra Morena", Córdoba, Spain. The "note added in proof" in that study mentions that similar worms were also found in sheep. Both male and female adults, as well as microcercariae dissected from the uterus of females were described.

== Hosts and geographic distribution ==
So far, E. elaphi has only been described from Spain, in Red deer (Cervus elaphus) and a sheep (Ovis aries).

== Description and life cycle ==
The life cycle of E. elaphi has not been studied in detail. However, the seasonal cycle of adult E. elaphi abundance in its host Cervus elaphus is similar to the seasonal abundance cycle of Elaeophora schneideri.

== Clinical significance ==
Adult E. elaphi have been found attached to the inner walls of the hepatic (liver) arteries and veins. Their presence affects the blood vessels in several ways, including inflammation of veins (phlebitis), blood clots (thrombosis), and thickening of artery walls. They also appear to induce a local humoral immune response in the host, including production of lymphoid tissue and granulomatous lesions. These lesions are sometimes found in the absence of the parasites, or in the presence of dead, calcified E. elaphi.

Reported rates of infestation vary from 6 to 41% of sampled deer. The number of E. elaphi found per infested deer (intensity of infestation) ranges from 1 to 21, with averages of 8.5 and 9 in the two studies. Even though the deer in the study had the lesions mentioned above, none of them displayed any overt clinical symptoms.

A red deer (Cervus elaphus) transported from Germany to Spain was not so fortunate. Six months after transport, it was found staggering and feverish; and it died the next day. Necropsy revealed 100 E. elaphi in its hepatic (liver) blood vessels - a much higher infestation intensity than was found in local deer - in addition to Theileria infection. Because E. elaphi has never been found in Germany, the authors suggest that this deer may not have developed a sufficient immune background to deal with E. elaphi infestation once it was relocated to the E. elaphi-endemic area of Spain.
