= Litomosoides odilae =

Scientific classification
- Kingdom: Animalia
- Phylum: Nematoda
- Class: Chromadorea
- Order: Rhabditida
- Family: Onchocercidae
- Genus: Litomosoides
- Species: L. odilae

Binomial name
- Litomosoides odilae Notarnicola & Navone, 2002

Species of roundworm

Litomosoides odilae is a nematode belonging to the family Onchocercidae.

== Distribution ==
This species has been discovered in Argentina.

== Morphology ==
Litomosoides odilae displays similar physical traits as Litomosoides petteri as well as other filarioids.
