= Elaeophora poeli =

Scientific classification
- Domain: Eukaryota
- Kingdom: Animalia
- Phylum: Nematoda
- Class: Chromadorea
- Order: Rhabditida
- Family: Onchocercidae
- Genus: Elaeophora
- Species: E. poeli

Binomial name
- Elaeophora poeli (Vryburg, 1879)

Species of roundworm

Elaeophora poeli is a parasitic nematode found in the aorta, and sometimes the heart, of various cattle throughout Asia, and in parts of Africa. It is a large nematode, with males measuring 45–70 mm long and 200-260 μm wide, and females 40–300 mm long and 350 μm wide. Microfilariae are 340-346 μm long and 7.0-7.5 μm wide. Despite the fact that it lives in nodules (aneurysms) in the walls of the aorta and heart, apparent clinical symptoms of E. poeli infestation are seldom reported.

== Discovery and nomenclature ==
This species was first described from Water buffalo in 1879, and named Filaria poeli. In 1912, it was transferred to the newly erected genus Elaeophora Railliet and Henry 1912. In 1938, a detailed redescription of E. poeli was published. In that study, E. poeli was determined to be the same animal that previous authors had referred to as Filaria blini and Filaria haemophila, both isolated from Water buffalo aortas.

== Hosts and geographic distribution ==
E. poeli has been found in several species of cattle: African buffalo (Syncerus caffer), Carabao or Water buffalo (Bubalus bubalis), and Zebu (Bos primigenius indicus). The geographic distribution of this species includes several Asian and African nations: Democratic Republic of Congo, India, Indonesia, Malaysia, Mozambique, the Philippines, Tanzania, Thailand, Uganda, and Vietnam.

== Life cycle ==
The life cycle of E. poeli is not known. The adults usually live attached to the inner walls of the aorta. They make aneurysmal (i.e. bulging) nodules in the wall of the aorta, which can be up to 2 cm in diameter. The male lives curled up inside the nodule, while the female lives with its head in the nodule and its body free in the lumen (interior space) of the aorta. Presumably the female sheds the offspring (microfilariae) directly into the host's bloodstream. Adults have also been found in nodules on the epicardium of the heart.

== Prevalence ==
The percentage of animals found to be infested in large-scale slaughterhouse studies range from 1.7% in Tanzanian Zebu (Bos primigenius indicus) to over 60% in Philippine Bubalus bubalis. A study of free-ranging buffalo in Queen Elizabeth National Park, Uganda, yielded a 55% infestation rate.

== Clinical significance ==
The nodules where the filariae reside (as described above) are aneurysms - bulges in the aorta wall - which could conceivably rupture. Corrugated and migratory tract lesions on the inner wall of the aorta and fibrin strands attached to the nodules have also been described. The latter study found narrowing of the aorta down to 1/3 of its usual diameter in some cases.

Despite the presence of nodules 2-cm in diameter on aorta walls and heart tissue, and narrowing of the aorta, almost all studies of E. poeli infestation mention a lack of obvious clinical symptoms in infested individuals. One study found a strong correlation between infestation and visceral pleurisy (inflammation of the membrane that surrounds the lungs).
