= Effects of parasitic worms on the immune system =

The effects of parasitic worms, or helminths, on the immune system is a recently emerging topic of study among immunologists and other biologists. Experiments have involved a wide range of parasites, diseases, and hosts. The effects on humans have been of special interest. The tendency of many parasitic worms to pacify the host's immune response allows them to mollify some diseases, while worsening others.

== Immune response hypothesis ==
=== Mechanisms of immune regulation ===
Extensive research shows that parasitic worms have the ability to deactivate certain immune system cells, leading to a gentler immune response. Often, such a response is beneficial to both parasite and host, according to Graham Rook, a professor of medical microbiology at University College London. This immune "relaxation" is incorporated throughout the immune system, decreasing immune responses against harmless allergens, gut flora, and the body itself.

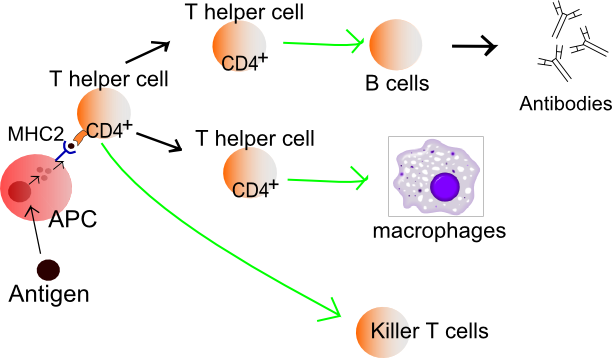
Importance of T helper cells in an immune response: T helper cells recognize antigens from antigen-presenting cells (APCs) and then release cytokines and activate other immune cells. Parasitic worms influence what kinds of T helper cells are activated.

In the past, helminths were thought to simply suppress T-helper Type 1 (Th1) cells while inducing T-helper Type 2 (Th2) cells. Rook points out that this hypothesis would only explain the regulatory effects of parasitic worms on autoimmune diseases caused by Th1 cells. However, helminths also regulate Th2-caused diseases, such as allergy and asthma. Rook postulates that different parasitic worms suppress different Th types, but always in favor of regulatory T (Treg) cells.

Rook explains that these regulatory T cells release interleukins that fight inflammation. In the Journal of Biomedicine and Biotechnology, Osada et al. note that macrophages induced by Treg cells fight not only the parasitic disease, but also resist the immune system's response to allergens and the body. According to Hopkin, the author of a 2009 Parasite Immunology article on asthma and parasitic worms, other immunoregulatory mechanisms are also activated, including Mast cells, eosinophils, and cytokines that invoke a strong immunoglobulin E (IgE) response. All these fight a hyperactive immune response, reduce the inflammation throughout the body, and thus lead to less severe autoimmune diseases.

Osada et al. state that because parasitic worms may and often do consist of allergens themselves, the degree to which they pacify or agitate the immune response against allergens is a balance of their regulating effects and their allergenic components. Therefore, depending on both of these variables, some parasitic worms may worsen allergies.

In their Parasite Immunology article on worms and viral infections, Kamal et al. explain why some parasitic worms aggravate the immune response. Because parasitic worms often induce Th2 cells and lead to suppressed Th1 cells, problems arise when Th1 cells are needed. Such cases occur with viral diseases. Several examples of viral infections worsened by parasitic worms are described below in the Negative Effects section.

=== Evolutionary theory ===
The positive effects of parasitic worms are theorized to be a result of millions of years of evolution, when humans and human ancestors would have been constantly inhabited by parasitic worms. In the journal EMBO Reports, Rook says that such helminths "are all either things that really do us no harm, or things where the immune system is forced to give in and avoid a fight because it's just a waste of time." In the journal Immunology, Rook states that, because parasitic worms were almost always present, the human immune system developed a way to treat them that didn't cause tissue damage.

The immune system extends this response to its treatments of self-antigens, softening reactions against allergens, the body, and digestive microorganisms. As the worms developed ways of triggering a beneficial immune response, humans came to rely on parasitic interaction to help regulate their immune systems. As developed countries advanced in technology, medicine, and sanitation, parasitic worms were mostly eradicated in those countries, according to Weinstock in the medical journal Gut. Because these events took place very recently on the evolutionary timeline and humans have progressed much faster technologically than genetically, the human immune system has not yet adapted to the absence of internal worms. This theory attempts to explain the rapid increase in allergies and asthma in the last century in the developed world, as well as the relative absence of autoimmune diseases in the developing world, where parasites are more common.

=== Comparison with the hygiene hypothesis ===
The Hygiene hypothesis postulates that decreasing exposure to pathogens and other microorganisms results in an increase of autoimmune diseases, according to Rook. This theory and the theory that certain parasitic worms pacify the immune response are similar in that both theories attribute the recent rise of autoimmune diseases to the decreased levels of pathogens in developed countries. However, the Hygiene Hypothesis claims that the absence of pathogenic organisms in general has led to this. In contrast, the parasitic worm theory only analyzes helminths, and specifically ones found to have a regulating effect.

== Positive effects ==
=== Type 1 diabetes ===
Type 1 diabetes (T1D) is an autoimmune disease in which the immune system destroys the body's pancreatic beta cells. In an experiment with mice, infection with parasitic worms or helminth-products generally inhibited the spontaneous development of T1D, according to Anne Cook in the journal Immunology. However, results varied among the different species of parasitic worms. Some helminth-products, like a protein of the nematode Acanthocheilonema viteae, didn't have any effect. Another infectious agent, Salmonella typhimurium was successful even when administered late in the development of T1D.

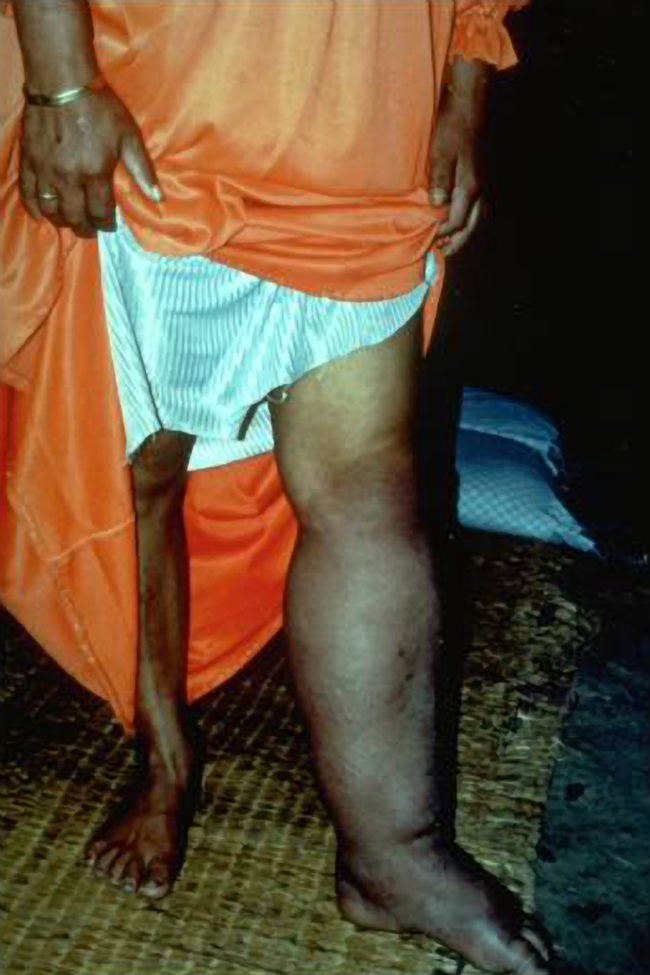
Elephantiasis, a disease caused by filarial nematodes

=== Allergy and asthma ===
According to Hopkin, asthma involves atopic allergy, which in turn involves the release of mediators that induce inflammation. In 2007, Melendez and his associates studied filarial nematodes and ES-62, a protein that nematodes secrete in their host. They discovered that pure ES-62 prevents the release of allergenic inflammatory mediators in mice, resulting in weaker allergic and asthmatic symptoms. In the Journal of Immunology, Bashir et al. describe their experimental findings that an allergic response against peanuts is inhibited in mice infected with an intestinal parasite.

=== Inflammatory bowel disease ===
Inflammatory bowel disease (IBD) is an autoimmune disease involving the inflammation of the gastrointestinal mucosa. Ulcerative colitis (UC) and Crohn's disease (CD) are both types of IBD. In the medical journal Gut, Moreels et al. describe their experiments on induced colitis in rats. They found that infecting the rats with the parasitic worm Schistosoma mansoni resulted in alleviated colitis effects. According to Weinstock, human patients of UC or CD improve when infected with the parasitic worm whipworm.

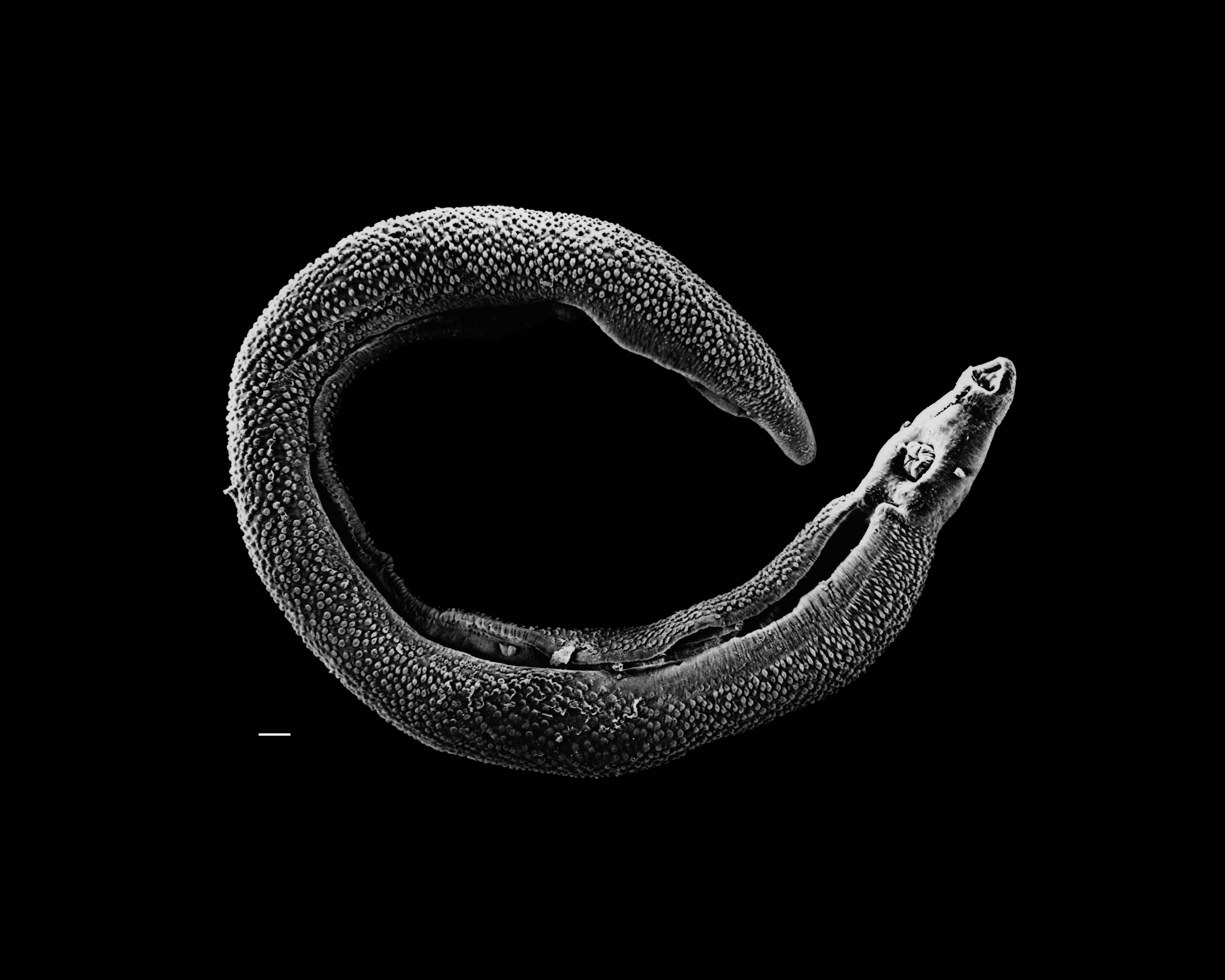
Schistosoma mansani, commonly known as the blood fluke

=== Arthritis ===
In 2003, Iain McInnes et al. found that arthritic-induced mice experienced less inflammation and other arthritic effects when infected with ES-62, a protein derived from filarial nematodes, a kind of parasitic worm. Similarly, in the International Journal for Parasitology, Osada et al. published their experimental findings that arthritis-induced mice infected with the parasitic worm Schistosoma mansoni had down-regulated immune systems. This led to resistance to arthritis.

=== Multiple sclerosis ===
In 2007, Jorge Correale et al. studied the effects of parasitic infection on multiple sclerosis (MS). Correale evaluated several MS patients infected with parasites, comparable MS patients without parasites, and similar healthy subjects over the course of 4.6 years. During the study, the MS patients that were infected with parasites experienced far less effects of MS than the non-infected MS patients.

== Negative effects ==
=== Vaccination ===
In the journal Parasite Immunology, Kamal et al. explains that parasitic worms often weaken the immune system's ability to effectively respond to a vaccine because such worms induce a Th2-based immune response that is less responsive than normal to antigens. This is a major concern in developing countries where parasitic worms and the need for vaccinations exist in large number. It may explain why vaccines are often ineffective in developing countries.

=== Hepatitis ===
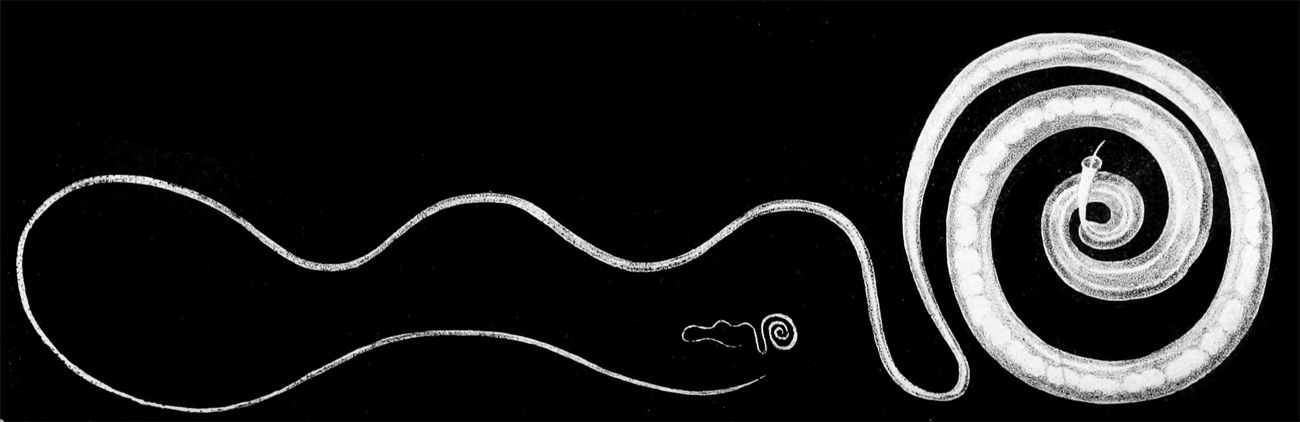
The human whipworm, a parasitic worm

Because Hepatitis C virus (HCV) and the parasitic worm Schistosoma (the bloodfluke) are relatively common in developing countries, there are many cases where both are present in the human body. According to Kamal, bloodflukes have been adequately shown to worsen HCV. Kamal explains that, in order to maintain an immune response against HCV, patients must sustain a certain level of CD4+ T-cells. However, the presence of bloodflukes closely and negatively correlates to the presence of CD4+ T-cells, and so a much higher percentage of those infected with bloodflukes are unable to combat HCV effectively and develop chronic HCV. Parasitic effects of Hepatitis B virus, however, are contested—some studies show little association, while others show exacerbation of the disease.

=== HIV ===
Because the two diseases are abundant in developing countries, there are many patients with both HIV (Human immunodeficiency virus) and parasites, and specifically bloodflukes. In his article, Kamal relates the findings that those infected with parasites are more likely to be infected by HIV. However, it is disputed whether or not the viral infection is more severe because of the parasites.

=== Tuberculosis ===
According to Kamal, the human immune system needs Th1 cells to effectively fight TB. Since the immune system often responds to parasitic worms by inhibiting Th1 cells, parasitic worms generally worsen tuberculosis. In fact, Tuberculosis patients who receive successful parasitic therapy experience major improvement.

=== Malaria ===
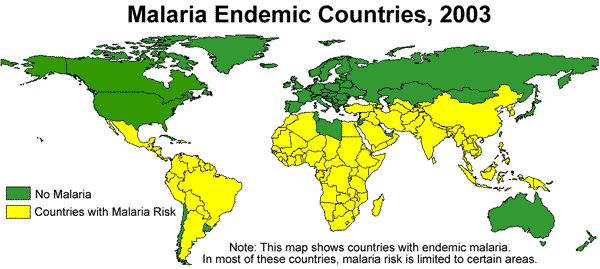
Malaria distribution map. Most countries with a high distribution of malaria also have a high distribution of parasitic worm infections.

In 2004, Sokhna et al. performed a study of Senegalese children. Those infected with blood flukes had significantly higher rates of malaria attacks than those who were not. Furthermore, children with the highest counts of blood flukes also had the most malaria attacks. Based on this study, Hartgers et al. drew a "cautious conclusion" that helminths make humans more susceptible to contracting malaria and experiencing some of its lighter symptoms, while actually protecting them from the worst symptoms. Hartgers reasons that a Th2-skewed immune system resulting from helminth infection would lower the immune system's ability to counter an initial malarial infection. However, it would also prevent a hyperimmune response resulting in severe inflammation, reducing morbidity and pathology.

== See also ==
- Hygiene hypothesis
- Evolutionary medicine
- Helminthic therapy
- Immunotherapy
- Disease of affluence

== Bibliography ==
- Bashir ME, Anderson P, Fuss I; et al. (2002). "An enteric helminth infection protects against an allergic response to dietary antigen". J Immunol. 169 (6): 3284–3292. doi:10.4049/jimmunol.169.6.3284. PMID 12218148.
- Cooke A (2008). "Review series on helminths, immune modulation and the hygiene hypothesis: How might infection modulate the onset of type 1 diabetes?". Immunology. 126 (1): 12–17. doi:10.1111/j.1365-2567.2008.03009.x. PMC 2632708. PMID 19120494.
- Correale J, Farez M (2007). "Association between parasitic infection and immune response in multiple sclerosis". Annals of Neurology. 61 (1): 97–108. doi:10.1002/ana.21067. PMID 17230481. S2CID 1033417.
- Hadley C (2004). "Should auld acquaintance be forgot. . ". EMBO Reports. 5 (1): 1122–1124. doi:10.1038/sj.embor.7400308. PMC 1299202. PMID 15577925.
- Hartgers FC, Yazdanbakhsh M (2006). "Co-infection of helminths and malaria: modulation of the immune responses to malaria". Parasite Immunology. 28 (10): 497–506. doi:10.1111/j.1365-3024.2006.00901.x. PMID 16965285. S2CID 20956686.
- Hopkin J (2009). "Immune and genetic aspects of asthma, allergy and parasitic worm infections: evolutionary links". Parasite Immunology. 31 (5): 267–273. doi:10.1111/j.1365-3024.2009.01104.x. PMID 19388947. S2CID 41746048.
- Kamal SM, Khalifa KE (2006). "Immune modulation by helminthic infections: worms and viral infections". Parasite Immunology. 28 (10): 483–496. doi:10.1111/j.1365-3024.2006.00909.x. PMID 16965284. S2CID 33976476.
- McInnes IB, Leung BP, Harnett M, Gracie JA, Liew FY, Harnett W (2003). "A novel therapeutic approach targeting articular inflammation using the filarial nematode-derived phosphorylcholine-containing glycoprotein ES-62". J. Immunol. 171 (4): 2127–33. doi:10.4049/jimmunol.171.4.2127. PMID 12902519.
- Melendez AJ, Harnett M, Pushparaj P; et al. (2007). "Inhibition of FceRI-mediated mast cell responses by ES-62, a product of parasitic filarial nematodes". Nature Medicine. 13 (11): 1375–1381. doi:10.1038/nm1654. PMID 17952092. S2CID 28404211.
- Moreels TG, Nieuwendijk RJ, Elliot DE; et al. (2004). "Concurrent infection with Schistosoma mansoni attenuates inflammation induced changes in colonic morphology, cytokine levels, and smooth muscle contractility of trinitrobenzene sulphonic acid induced colitis in rats". Gut. 53 (1): 99–107. doi:10.1136/gut.53.1.99. PMC 1773910. PMID 14684583.
- Osada Y, Kanazawa T (2010). "Parasitic Helminths: New Weapons against Immunological Disorders". Journal of Biomedicine and Biotechnology. 2010 (1): 1–9. doi:10.1155/2010/743758. PMC 2821776. PMID 20169100.
- Osada Y, Shimizu S, Kumagai T; et al. (2008). "Schistosoma mansoni infection reduces severity of collagen-induced arthritis via down-regulation of pro-inflammatory mediators". Int. J. Parasitol. 39 (4): 457–464. doi:10.1016/j.ijpara.2008.08.007. PMID 18835272.
- Rook GA (2008). "Review series on helminths, immune modulation and the hygiene hypothesis: The broader implications of the hygiene hypothesis". Immunology. 126 (1): 3–11. doi:10.1111/j.1365-2567.2008.03007.x. PMC 2632706. PMID 19120493.
- Sokhna C, Le Hesran J Y, Mbaye P; et al. (2004). "Increase of malaria attacks among children presenting concomitant infection by Schistosoma mansoni in Senegal". Malar. J. 3 (1): 43. doi:10.1186/1475-2875-3-43. PMC 538284. PMID 15544703.
- Weinstock JV, Summers R, Elliott DE (2004). "Helminths and harmony". Gut. 53 (1): 7–9. doi:10.1136/gut.53.1.7. PMC 1773927. PMID 14684567.
- Weinstock JV, Summer R, Elliott D (2005). "Role of helminths in regulating mucosal inflammation". Springer Semin Immunopathol. 27 (2): 249–271. doi:10.1007/s00281-005-0209-3. PMID 15959781. S2CID 22321089.
- Beros S., Lenhart A., Scharf I., Negroni M. A., Menzel F., Foitzik S. (2021). "Extreme lifespan extension in tapeworm-infected ant workers". Royal Society Open Science. 8 (5) 202118. doi:10.1098/rsos.202118. PMC 8131941.
- Stoldt M, Klein L, Beros S, Butter F, Jongepier E, Feldmeyer B, Foitzik S (2021). "Parasite Presence Induces Gene Expression Changes in an Ant Host Related to Immunity and Longevity". Genes (Basel). 12: 95. doi:10.3390/genes12010095. PMC 7828512. PMID 33451085.
- Crowe J, Lumb FE, Doonan J, Broussard M, Tarafdar A, Pineda MA, Landabaso C, Mulvey L, Hoskisson PA, Babayan SA, Selman C, Harnett W, Harnett MM (2020). "The parasitic worm product ES-62 promotes health- and life-span in a high calorie diet-accelerated mouse model of ageing". PLoS Pathog. 16 e1008391. doi:10.1371/journal.ppat.1008391. PMC 7108737. PMID 32163524.
