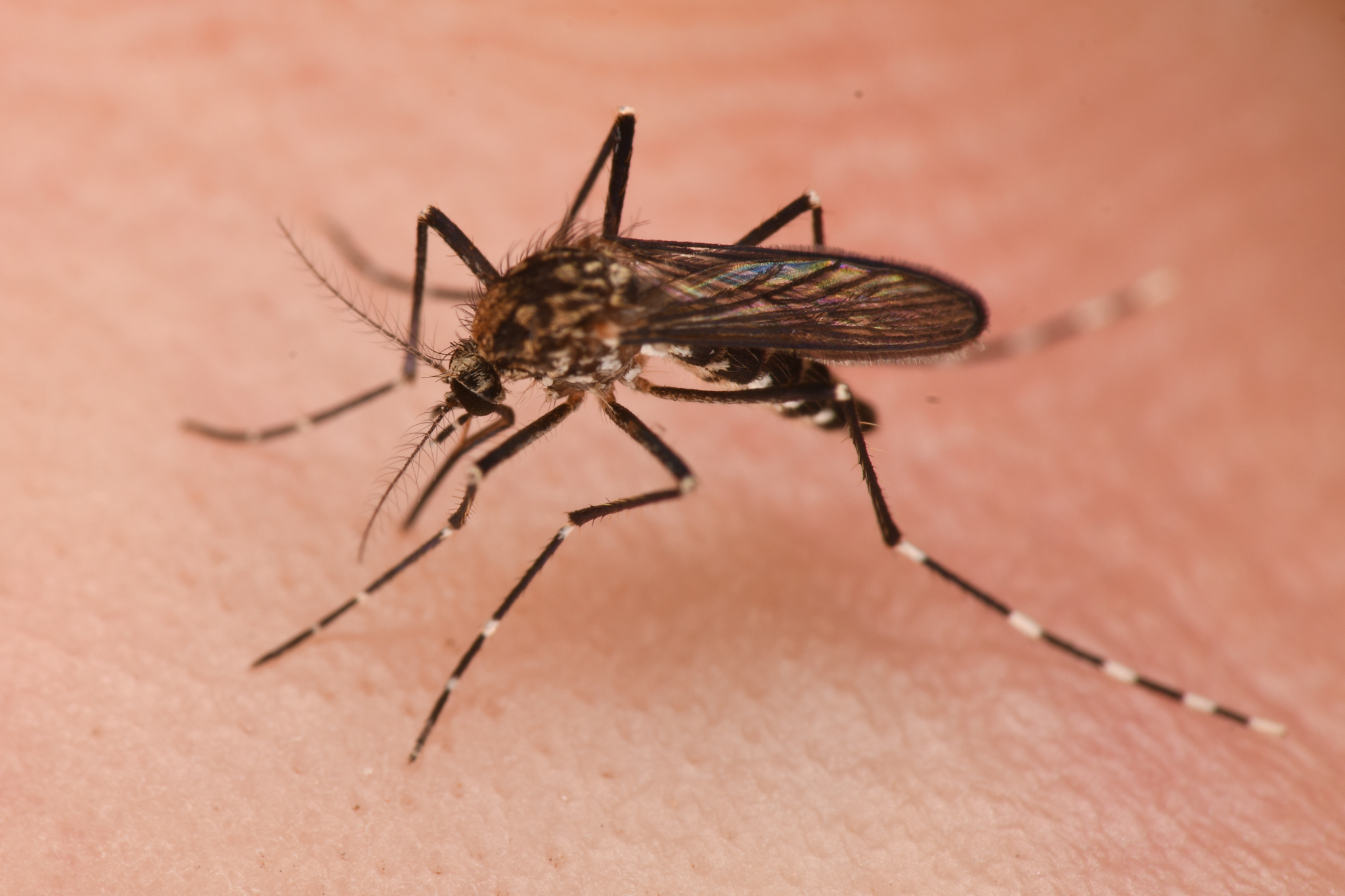

Scientific classification
- Kingdom: Animalia
- Phylum: Arthropoda
- Class: Insecta
- Order: Diptera
- Family: Culicidae
- Genus: Aedes
- Subgenus: Jarnellius
- Species: A. sierrensis

Binomial name
- Aedes sierrensis (Ludlow, 1905)

Synonyms
- Jarnellius sierrensis (Ludlow, 1905); Taeniorhynchus sierrensis Ludlow, 1905

= Aedes sierrensis =

Species of mosquito

Aedes sierrensis, or Western tree hole mosquito, is a species of mosquito in the genus Aedes native to western North America. It is primarily found in areas with oak and mixed deciduous forests, ranging from southern California to British Columbia, and reaching as far east as Utah.

== Habitat and breeding ==
A. sierrensis gets its name from its preferred breeding sites: water-filled cavities in trees, particularly in oak, laurel, madrone, and eucalyptus. Occasionally, it may also breed in artificial containers with high organic content, such as leaf-filled roof gutters, tires, cans, and buckets.

== Life cycle and behavior ==
The species is typically univoltine, meaning it produces one generation per year. Adults usually emerge from overwintering larvae in spring, with peak abundance occurring in April and May. However, additional broods may develop in years with favorable environmental conditions, such as excessive rainfall and warmer temperatures.

A. sierrensis is known to be a vicious biter, primarily active outdoors during mid-morning and late afternoon, and typically avoid sunlight. It feeds on humans and other large mammals, posing a significant nuisance in residential and recreational areas with large numbers of trees, especially from March through August.

== Public health and population control ==
The Western tree hole mosquito is a major vector of dog heartworm disease (caused by Dirofilaria immitis) in California and other parts of western United States. When a mosquito bites a dog infected with heartworm, it picks up tiny worms called microfilariae. If that mosquito then bites another susceptible dog, it can transmit the infection. The microfilariae then travel through the new dog's bloodstream, eventually reaching the heart and large blood vessels, where they mature into adults. These adult worms reproduce, releasing more microfilariae, continuing the heartworm cycle. This makes it a species of veterinary importance.
