= Sarconema =

Sarconema may refer to:

- Sarconema (nematode), a genus of nematodes in the family Onchocercidae
- Sarconema (alga), a genus of algae in the family Solieriaceae
