= Elaeophora bohmi =

Scientific classification
- Domain: Eukaryota
- Kingdom: Animalia
- Phylum: Nematoda
- Class: Chromadorea
- Order: Rhabditida
- Family: Onchocercidae
- Genus: Elaeophora
- Species: E. bohmi

Binomial name
- Elaeophora bohmi Supperer, 1953

Species of roundworm

Elaeophora bohmi is a nematode parasite found in various arteries of the horse. The adult males are 44-55 mm long and 95 μm wide, while adult females can be over 12 cm long and 210 μm wide. Microfilariae are not sheathed, and measure 300-330 μm long and 6-7 μm wide. The life cycle and clinical symptoms of infestation by E. bohmi have not been described.

== Discovery and nomenclature ==
Elaeophora bohmi was first described in 1953, from adults found in the arteries and veins in the extremities of Austrian horses. In 1976, some authors considered it to be a species of the genus Onchocerca -- Onchocerca bohmi (Supperer 1953) Bain et al., 1976 -- but most recent parasitology texts still refer to this species as Elaeophora bohmi.

== Hosts and geographic distribution ==
So far, E. bohmi has only been found in horses (Equus caballus) in Austria and Iran. Adults were found in the medial layer or outside layer of tissues within the artery wall.

== Life cycle ==
The life cycle of E. bohmi has not been studied.

== Prevalence and clinical significance ==
In the original species description, Supperer found E. bohmi in 6.7% of the Austrian horses examined. A survey of blood samples found E. bohmi microfilariae in 8.69% of Iranian horses examined, but none in donkeys or mules. Clinical symptoms of infestation have not been described.
