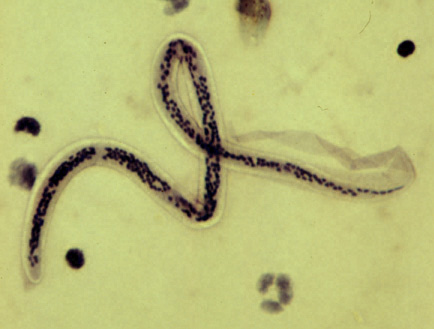
- Microfilaria of Wuchereria bancrofti, from a patient seen in Haiti. Thick blood smears stained with hematoxylin. The microfilaria is sheathed, its body is gently curved, and the tail is tapered to a point. The nuclear column (the cells that constitute the body of the microfilaria) is loosely packed, the cells can be visualized individually and do not extend to the tip of the tail. The sheath is slightly stained with hematoxylin.

Scientific classification
- Kingdom: Animalia
- Phylum: Nematoda
- Class: Chromadorea
- Order: Rhabditida
- Family: Onchocercidae
- Genus: Wuchereria
- Species: W. bancrofti

Binomial name
- Wuchereria bancrofti (Cobbold, 1877)

Synonyms
- Filaria bancrofti Cobbold, 1877; Filaria sanguinis hominis Lewis, 1877; Filaria nocturna Manson

= Wuchereria bancrofti =

Species of parasitic worm

Wuchereria bancrofti is a filarial (arthropod-borne) nematode (roundworm) that is the major cause of lymphatic filariasis. It is one of the three parasitic worms, together with Brugia malayi and B. timori, that infect the lymphatic system to cause lymphatic filariasis. These filarial worms are spread by a variety of mosquito vector species. W. bancrofti is the most prevalent of the three and affects over 120 million people, primarily in Central Africa and the Nile delta, South and Central America, the tropical regions of Asia including southern China, and the Pacific islands. If left untreated, the infection can develop into lymphatic filariasis. In rare conditions, it also causes tropical pulmonary eosinophilia. No vaccine is commercially available, but high rates of cure have been achieved with various antifilarial regimens, and lymphatic filariasis is the target of the World Health Organization Global Program to Eliminate Lymphatic Filariasis with the aim to eradicate the disease as a public-health problem by 2020. This goal was not met.

== Morphology ==
As a dioecious worm, W. bancrofti exhibits sexual dimorphism. The adult worm is long, cylindrical, slender, and smooth with rounded ends. It is white in colour and almost transparent. The body is quite delicate, making removing it from tissues difficult. It has a short cephalic or head region connected to the main body by a short neck, which appears as a constriction. Dark spots are dispersed nuclei throughout the body cavity, with no nuclei at the tail tip. Males and females can be differentiated by size and structure of their tail tips. The male worm is smaller, 40 mm (1.6 in) long and 100 μm (0.0039 in) wide, and features a ventrally curved tail. The tip of the tail has 15 pairs of minute caudal papillae, the sensory organs. The anal region is an elaborate structure consisting of 12 pairs of papillae, of which eight are in front and four are behind the anus. In contrast, the female is 60 millimetres (2.4 in) to 100 millimetres (3.9 in) long and 300 micrometres (0.012 in) wide, nearly three times larger in diameter than the male. Its tail gradually tapers and is rounded at the tip. No additional sensory structures are seen. Its vulva lies towards the anterior region, about 0.25 mm from the head. Adult males and females are most often coiled together and are difficult to separate. Females are ovoviviparous and can produce thousands of juveniles known as microfilariae.

The microfilaria is a miniature adult, and retains the egg membrane as a sheath, and is often considered an advanced embryo. It measures 280 μm long and 25 μm wide. It appears quite structureless in vivo, but histological staining makes its primitive gut, nerve ring, and muscles apparent.

== Lifecycle ==
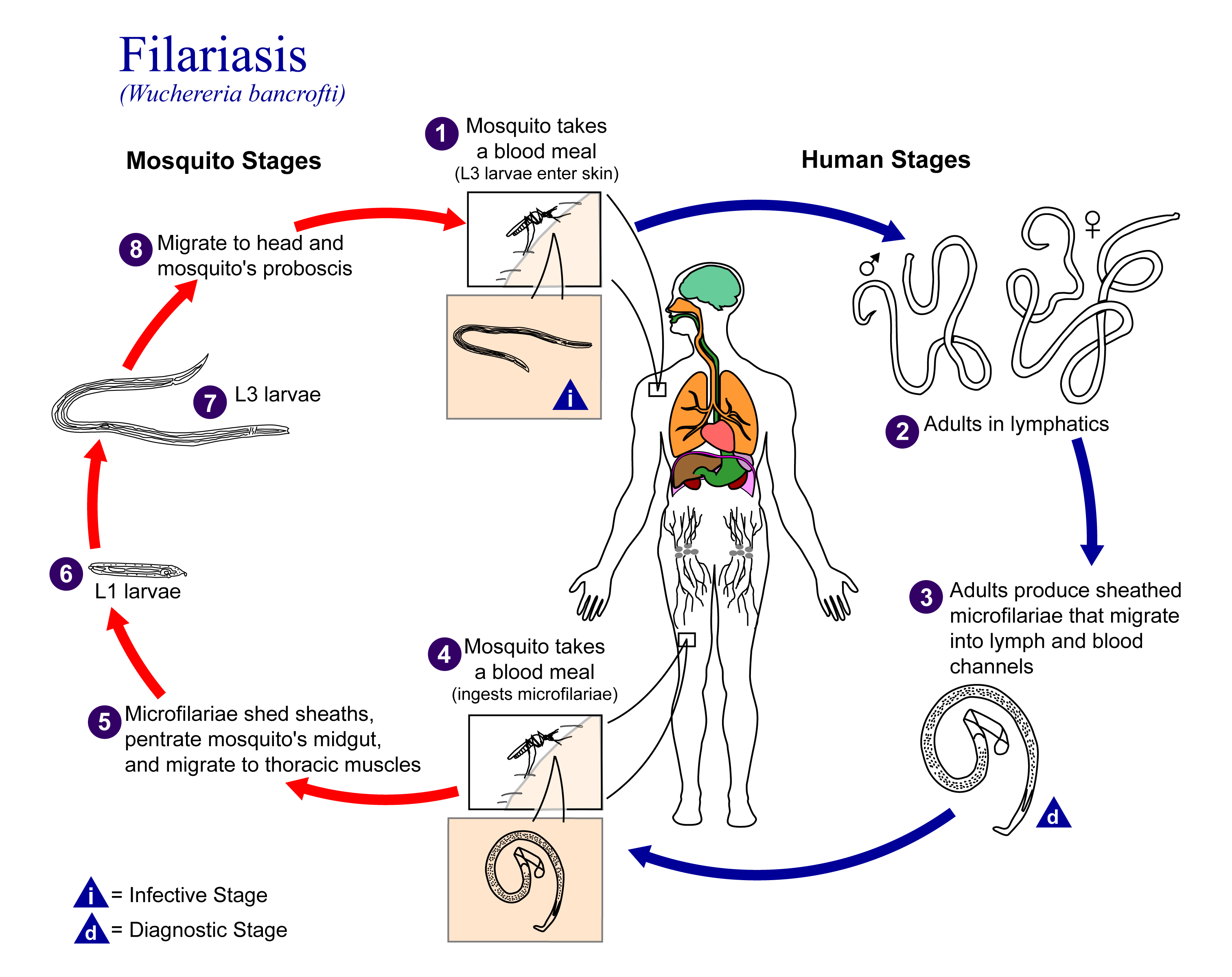
Lifecycle of Wuchereria bancrofti

W. bancrofti carries out its lifecycle in two hosts. Humans serve as the definitive host and mosquitos as the intermediate host. The adult parasites reside in the lymphatics of the human host. They are found mostly in the afferent lymphatic channels of the lymph glands in the lower part of the body. The first-stage larvae, known as microfilariae, are present in the circulation. The microfilariae have a membrane "sheath". This sheath, along with the area in which the worms reside, makes identification of the species of microfilariae in humans easier to determine. The microfilariae are found mainly in the peripheral blood and can be found at peak amounts from 10 pm to 4 am. They migrate between the deep and the peripheral, circulation exhibiting unique diurnal periodicity. During the day, they are present in the deep veins, and during the night, they migrate to the peripheral circulation. The cause of this periodicity remains unknown, but the advantages of the microfilariae being in the peripheral blood during these hours may ensure the vector, the nighttime mosquito, will have a higher chance of transmitting them elsewhere. Physiological changes also are associated with sleeping, such as lowered body temperature, oxygen tension, and adrenal activity, and an increased carbon dioxide tension, among other physical alterations, any of which could be the signals for the rhythmic behavior of microfilarial parasites. If the hosts sleep by day and are awake at night, their periodicity is reversed. In the South Pacific, where W. bancrofti shows diurnal periodicity, it is known as periodic.

The microfilariae are transferred into a vector, which are most commonly mosquito species of the genera Culex, Anopheles, Mansonia, and Aedes. Inside the mosquito, the microfilariae mature into motile larvae called juveniles; these migrate to the labium after a period around 10 days. When the infected mosquito has its next blood meal, W. bancrofti larvae are deposited from the mouthparts onto the skin of the prospective host and migrate through microcuts in the dermis or the tract created by the proboscis into the bloodstream of the new human host. The larvae move through the lymphatic system to regional lymph nodes, predominantly in the legs and genital area. The larvae develop into adult worms over the course of a year, and reach sexual maturity in the afferent lymphatic vessels. After mating, the adult female worm can produce thousands of microfilariae that migrate into the bloodstream. A mosquito vector can bite the infected human host, ingest the microfilariae, and thus repeat the lifecycle. The organism notably does not multiply within its intermediate host, the mosquito.

== History ==
The effects of W. bancrofti were documented early in ancient texts. Ancient Greek and Roman writers noted the similarities between the enlarged limbs and thickened, cracked skin of infected individuals to that of elephants, hence the name elephantiasis to describe the disease.

In 1862 in Paris, Jean-Nicolas Demarquay found what appeared to be nematode worms in the fluid aspirated from a hydrocele in a young man from Havana, Cuba. Unaware of this observation, three years later in Bahia, Brazil, Otto Wucherer found these same worms but this time in urine from a woman with chyluria. Ignorant of both these observations, Timothy Lewis in India in 1870 found them in the urine of an Indian with chyluria then two years later found them in blood. Some of Lewis's specimens were examined in the same year in England by George Busk who named them Filaria sanguinis hominis. In 1876 and 1877, Joseph Bancroft in Brisbane, Australia found adult worms in lymphatic abscesses in patients with larvae in the blood. He sent them to Spencer Cobbold in London who named them Filaria Bancrofti. Patrick Manson in Xiamen, China (then called Amoy) made two important observations. Firstly he discovered in 1877 that if Culex quinquefasciatus and Aedes aegypti mosquitoes fed on a person with larvae (microfilariae) in the blood, they moulted twice in the insects' abdomen and became larger worms now called infective larvae. Secondly, he found in 1879 that the blood-dwelling forms had a nocturnal periodicity with large numbers appearing in the blood around midnight with minimal numbers in the middle of the day. This coincided with the biting habits of these mosquitoes. Manson surmised that infected mosquitoes drowned and infective larvae were ingested in water. In 1899, Thomas Bancroft in Brisbane fed laboratory-reared mosquitoes on a patient with microfilaraemia, kept them for 16 days, then sent some specimens to George Low in London. Low prepared histological sections of the mosquitoes and found that the larvae migrated from the abdomen to the thorax to the salivary glands then passed down the proboscis suggesting that infective larvae were injected at a subsequent mosquito bite. In 1902, Thomas Bancroft proved that this was the mode of transmission using a related worm, Dirofilaria immitis, and generated adult worms in experimentally infected dogs. In 1921, Léon Seurat erected the genus Wuchereria and placed this worm in it as Wuchereria bancrofti.

W. bancrofti is speculated to have been brought to the New World by the slave trade. Once it was introduced to the New World, this filarial worm disease persisted throughout the areas surrounding Charleston, South Carolina, until its sudden disappearance in the 1920s.
