= Acanthocheilonema =

Scientific classification
- Kingdom: Animalia
- Phylum: Nematoda
- Class: Chromadorea
- Order: Rhabditida
- Family: Onchocercidae
- Genus: Acanthocheilonema

Genus of roundworms

Acanthocheilonema is a genus within the family Onchocercidae which comprises mainly tropical parasitic worms. Cobbold created the genus Acanthocheilonema with only one species, Acanthocheilonema dracunculoides, which was collected from aardwolf (Proteles cristatus: Hyaenidae) in the region of South Africa in the nineteenth century. These parasites have a wide range of mammalian species as hosts, including members of Carnivora, Macroscelidea, Rodentia, Pholidota, Edentata, and Marsupialia. Many species among several genera of filarioids exhibit a high degree of endemicity in studies done on mammalian species in Japan. However, no concrete evidence has confirmed any endemic species in the genus Acanthocheilonema.

There are about fifteen well characterized parasitic species found in genus Acanthocheilonema. A. delicata n. sp. (2013), A. dracunculoides (Cobbold 1870), A. filaria (Kou, 1958), A. mansonbahri (Nelson, 1961), A. mephitis (Webster and Beauregard, 1964), A. odendhali (Perry, 1967), A. pachycephalum (Ortlepp, 1961), A. pricei (Vaz and Pereira, 1934), A. procyonis (Price, 1955), A. reconditum (Grassi, 1889), A. sabanicolae (Eberhard and Campo-Aasen, 1986), A. setariosa (Mönnig, 1926), A. spirocauda (Leidy, 1858), A. viteae (Krepkogorskaja, 1933), and A. weissi (Seurat, 1914) are the well characterized parasitic species found all around the world in variety of hosts. Some of the crucial parasites that affect a wide range of host species are discussed below.

== Acanthocheilonema delicata ==
Acanthocheilonema delicata was discovered and characterized from an endemic badger species (Meles anakuma) in Japan. The researchers identified the DNA sequences of mitochondrial cytochrome c oxidase subunit 1 (cox1) gene in the Japanese badgers. Morphologically, filarioids analyzed were identified as thin, small and delicate and in females the length was longer (twice as in males). Anterior of the filarioids is slightly bulbous having two sets of four papilla (worms) and amphids. They possess distinct buccal cavity with buccal capsule consisting of a thick buccal ring. The esophagus is divided into short anterior muscular portion and long, posterior glandular portion. Caudal extremity in both males and females consists of three conical lappets. The location of the parasitic adult worms in the host species (Meles anakuma) was found to be the subcutaneous connective tissue, whereas the microfilaria was found in the skin. Data taken from the Genbank of fourteen species of genus Acanthocheilonema compared to the newly found species for possible similarities and distinctions shown in the table below:

Comparison of morphological characteristics of Acanthocheilonema parasites
Species →	A. delicata	A. dracunculoides	A. odendhali	A. reconditum	A. spirocauda	A. viteae
Body length	Female-22–38; Male-10–16μm	Female-38.5–45.2; Male-21.7–24μm	Female-100-150; Male-46-64μm	Female-20.7-25.5; Male-9.3-17.1μm	Female-155; Male-87μm	Female-49μm; Male-38μm
Body width at mid-body	Female-85-140;Male-60-85μm	Female-220-280;Male-140-160μm	Female-348-415;Male-228-281μm	Female-146-168;Male-92-100μm	Female-660;Male-400μm	Female-230-350;Male-155-165μm
Total esophagus length	Female-3000–4125;Male-2520–3350μm	Female-1940–2500;Male-1960–2170μm	Female-1782–2197;Male-1890–2251μm	Female-2040–2340;Male-1860–2040μm	Female-1300–1800;Male-1900–2000μm	Female-1370-1570;Male-1600-1660μm
Tail	Female-167–250;Male-113–162μm	Female-240–395;Male-140–180μm	Female-214–322;Male-147–245μm	Female-180–300;Male-80–145μm	Female-260;Male-230μm	Female-320–470;Male-280μm
No. of terminal lappets	3	3	3	3	Female-3; Male-4	3
Microfilariae width	7-9μm	4.5-5.2μm	3.5μm	4.5μm	4-4.5μm	4.5μm
Microfilariae body length	153–180μm	121-218μm	231-249μm	270μm	266-302μm	180-200μm
Host animal	Meles anakuma	Proteles cristatus and spotted hyaena	Zalophus californianus	Crocuta crocuta and Hyaena hyaena	Phoca vitulina concolor	Meriones libycus
Parasitic location of adult worms	Subcutaneous connective tissue	Peritoneal cavity	Intermuscular fascia	Subcutaneous connective tissue	Pulmonary artery and right ventricle	Subcutaneous tissue
Parasitic location of microfilariae	Skin	Blood	blood	blood	blood	blood
locality	Japan	Kenya	California, US	Italy, India, US, Kenya, Japan	coastal Maine, US	Iran
Reference						

== Acanthocheilonema dracunculoides ==
Acanthocheilonema dracunculoides Cobbold, a species discovered in 1870, is a nematode parasitic worm particularly found in domestic dogs and other carnivores like aardwolf, spotted hyaena and red fox. These parasites can be located on various continents like Europe, Asia and Africa. it is known to be endemic in Morocco, Algeria, Tunisia, Mali, Niger, Democratic Republic of Congo, Sudan, Somalia, Kenya, Tanzania and South Africa. This parasite follows an indirect life cycle. In the carnivore species, the male and female parasite tend to be biased to exist mainly in the peritoneal cavity. Males are typically shorter and are 15–32 mm long and 0.1–0.2 mm wide, whereas females are almost double, standing at 30–60 mm long and 0.1–0.3 mm wide in diameter. Sexually mature female parasites of A. dracunculoides are viviparous, they produce L1-stages, known as microfilariae, which eventually appear in the peripheral blood. Microfilariae are unsheathed and measure 185–276 μm (length) by 4.2–6 μm (width) Although the final host is the carnivores for A. dracunculoides there are some other intermediate hosts that are involved in the parasite life cycle. Louse fly Hippobosca longipennis and the hard tick Rhipicephalus sanguineus, also known as dog tick, have been identified as intermediate hosts that helps the parasite to complete its life cycle. Although Acanthocheilonema dracunculoides has a reputation of not being an endemic parasite in the domestic dogs, recent evidence of the presence of the parasite in domestic animals show some signs of pathogenicity. As mostly these parasites are considered innocuous in the dogs, recent studies and evidence from Spain suggests that the parasite is not completely harmless and innocuous in the domestic dogs as believed earlier.

The discovery of Acanthocheilonema parasites in the non-endemic species has triggered more research in this field. Dirofilaria immitis, D. repens, Acanthocheilonema dracunculoides and A. reconditum are the common species that have been known to be found in canine filarial nematodes. These nematodes present blood circulating microfilariae which are differentiated to the species level using the techniques like PCR and by acid phosphatase activity patterns. A. reconditum and A. dracunculoides live in the peritoneal cavity and adipose tissue of the host species and are less pathogenic, however D. immitis and D. repens are considered to be the emerging agents of parasitic zoonoses and are continuously expanding their ranges in the European. areas.

== Acanthocheilonema odendhali ==
The filarial worm Acanthocheilonema odendhali was first discovered in 1967 from the California California sea lion Zalophus californianus. This species was found inhabiting the intermuscular fascia and thoracic and the abdominal cavities. Initially this species was described in the Dipetalonema genus as Dipetalonema odendhali, however due to later evidences it was transferred to the genus Acanthocheilonema. A. odendhali was subsequently found in other marine species like Steller sea lion (Eumetopias jubatus) and northern fur seal (Callorhinus ursinus). Besides the A. odendhali, other filarioidean species such as A. spirocauda, commonly known as heart-worm has also been identified as parasitic in phocids.

A. odendhali was primarily reported in the northern fur seals on the island of Pribilof Archipelago in 1967. Prior to that two scientists Mark C. Keyes and Eugene T. Lyons had discovered the microfilariae in the blood of subadult male seals and adult filarioids and microfilariae in the samples collected from the blubber, fur, and the skin from these male seals. In these studies, the prevalence and the intensity of these species were not examined. The life cycle of A. odendhali is still unknown. However, according to the National Marine Mammal Laboratory, Northwest and Alaska Fisheries Center (NWAFC) reports, some blood-sucking flies or insects that infest the wounds are potential intermediate hosts (vectors) in their life cycle. Pathogenicity of A. odendhali was however not studied in these experiments and research but this parasite is considered as non-pathogenic. In 2011 and 2012, a study that investigated helminths of northern fur seals on Saint Paul Island in Alaska discovered that A. odendhali was a parasite on the seals. Other research done by the same group investigated the intensity and prevalence of the parasite and discovered that prevalence of adult A. odendhali parasites in the fur seals was 18 percent; the intensity depends on the individual host species and the seven parasite specimens found in the parasite. Average intensity of infection was approximately 1.32 ±0.83 SD, whereas the abundance was found to be 0.24 SD.

== Acanthocheilonema reconditum ==
Acanthocheilonema reconditum is a non-pathogenic canine helminth parasite of the specialized connective tissue. It is distributed in the same endemic areas as D. immitis, which is also known as heart-worm. Although it is endemic to some areas mentioned earlier, but the parasite is widely distributed as it has been identified in other species and around different continents. Dogs are frequently parasitized by the filarids. This transmission is usually carried out by the flea species and lice species. Flea vectors include species such as Ctenocephalides canis, Pulex irritans, Pulex simulans, and Echidnophaga gallinacea, whereas the lice species include Linognathus setosus and Heterodoxus spiniger. These vectors are infected with the A. reconditum parasite with the microfilariae during the blood repast in a parasitized dog. These species act as intermediate hosts in completing the life cycle of the parasite.

These microfilariae develop onto an infectious stage during the L3 (larvae stage 3) stage in the digestive tract of these vectors from where they can be inoculated into the new host. The third stage larvae could be found as soon as 7 days after the appearance of the vectors on the donor host species. (L3) Once it enters the new host species, the microfilariae develops into the adult stage. Most of these adult stage parasites are located in the subcutaneous tissue. Although the infection by A. reconditum does not exhibit any clinical signs, a treatment to limit dissemination is primarily recommended. Recent studies of A. reconditum occurrence in the southern regions of Italy has shown prevalence of this parasite as high as 13.3% with an annual incidence rate of 5.9%, which was observed in naturally exposed dogs. Recent experiments have enhanced scientific knowledge of the biology and ecology of this parasite. The full development of microfilariae occurs in the experimental infected cat flea Ctenocephalides felis felis in about 15 days. Localization and size of this parasite in this infected flea suggests the possibility that this might act as an intermediate host throughout the ingestion of the infected fleas rather than inoculation of the blood meal on dogs. Ivermectin (0.25 mg/kg) is a drug that is preferred to treat infection by this parasite. As microfilariae of this parasite are mainly found in the blood, they are often mistaken for other parasites like Dirofilaria immitis. It is therefore crucial to identify and distinguish between them using modified Knott's procedure.

== Acanthocheilonema spirocauda ==
Acanthocheilonema spirocauda, also known as seal heartworm, is a filarial parasite that primarily infects the phocid seals, including Phoca vitulina (Harbor seal). The Heartworm was originally described as Filaria spirocauda by Leidy. Eventually Acanthocheilonema was raised to generic level and this species settled under this genus, and a researcher Anderson presented its current name. A. spirocauda is found in the heart of the seals, and that is why is got its name 'Heartworm'. While there is no significant threat to the seal populations due to this parasite as of now; however, the infection with this parasite can result in pathological consequences like in the case of D. immitis, which includes the characteristics such as anorexia, fatigue, heart and lung complications, and potentially death. Researchers suggest that these parasites share strong evolutionary basis with its phocid hosts about some 45 million years ago It is believed to be transmitted via the seal louse (Echinophthirius horridus). The prevalence of the parasite in the host species is approximately 8.8%, and intensity ranges up to 44 specimens per heart.

Additional researchers have investigated its additional potential hosts and global distribution patterns of this parasite. Studies discovered some additional hosts of this parasite that include ribbon seal P. fasciata, harp seal P. groenlandica, ringed seal P. hispida, Baltic ringed seal P. h. botnica, Ladoga seal P.h. ladogensis, spotted seal P. largha, hooded seal Cystophora cristata, and bearded seal Erignathus barbatus. The primary sites of infection in the hosts are the right and left ventricles of the heart, pulmonary vein, pulmonary artery, and vena cava. These parasites are widely distributed around the globe. They can be found in the Northern Hemisphere and Holarctic realm. The present localities of A. spirocauda include the Danish North Sea (Agger Tange), Limfjord (Thy), Skagerrak (Lysekil) and Kattegat (Rungsted, Lille Vrøj), and the Baltic Sea (Lunds høje, Falster).

== Acanthocheilonema viteae ==
Acanthocheilonema viteae is a filarial nematode that infects rodent species. A. viteae is also used as a model species in the research experiments in order to study human filarial infections. The natural hosts for this parasite are gerbils, whereas the experimental hosts include hamsters, jirds (Meriones unguiculatus, also known as Mongolian gerbils), and Mastomys species. The vector that aids to finish its life cycle is a soft tick named Ornithodoros tartakovskyi (natural) and Ornithodoros moubata (experimental vector). The adults of A. viteae reside in the deep subcutaneous tissue, whereas the microfilariae circulate in the blood. These worms are known to modulate the host immunological systems, however they do not prohibit the immunological pathways entirely. It renders them increased survival. An excretory product called ES-62 is secreted by A. viteae and is homologous to ones produced by nematodes that infect humans but not those of non-parasitic species. ES-62 molecules tend to exhibit anti-inflammatory actions, using a phosphorylcholine-bearing moiety to affect the intracellular pathways that are associated with the antigen receptors and TLR-dependent cell responses.

In nature, during the third larvae infected stage, A. viteae parasites are transferred to their mammalian hosts with the aid of vector Ornithodoros tartakovskyi. In the mammalian host, the L3 stage develops to mature adults and generates the microfilariae, which are again ingested by ticks. After reaching L3, parasites transfer to mammalian hosts via arthropods' mouth parts. Various stages of A. viteae have two chitinase protein bands, one of 205 kDa and 68 Kda. Studies reveal that the 205 kDa band of stage L3 was an oligomer formed of 68kDa monomers. Chitin has been reported as a component of the eggshells of these nematodes. Chitinase plays a vital role in the third larvae stage (L3) and female worms, as its inhibition during these stages leads to have increased mortality. There are no safe and efficient drugs to eliminate these infections so far but chitin is seen as a potential target for the development of anthelmintic drugs and vaccines. Intracellular bacteria Wolbachia are prevalent among the different species of nematodes. However, Wolbachia is absent in Acanthocheilonema viteae. Since A. viteae lacks Wolbachia, it is widely used as a negative control for experiments investigating the bacterium. Their role in the pathology of filarial infections and symbiotic nature with host makes it potential target to intervene in filarial infections in humans.
