= Chandlerella =

Scientific classification
- Kingdom: Animalia
- Phylum: Nematoda
- Class: Chromadorea
- Order: Rhabditida
- Family: Onchocercidae
- Genus: Chandlerella; Yorke & Maplestone, 1926

Genus of nematodes

Chandlerella is a genus of nematodes belonging to the family Onchocercidae.

The species of this genus are found in Malesia and Northern America.

Species:

- Chandlerella bosei (Chandler, 1924)
- Chandlerella hispanica Lopez Caballero, 1974
- Chandlerella quiscali
- Chandlerella sinensis Li, 1933
- Chandlerella stantschinskyi Gilbert, 1930
