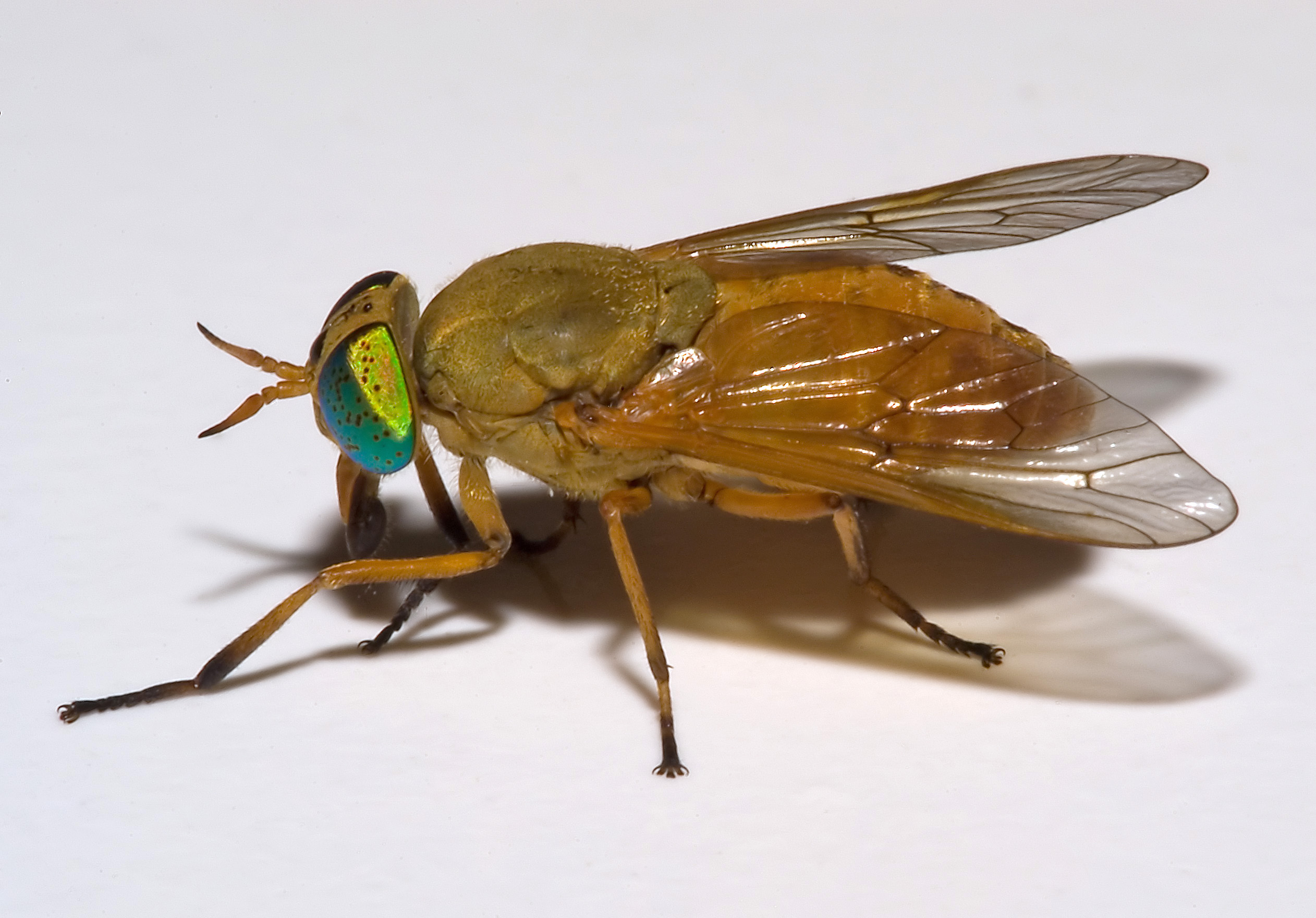
- Silvius alpinus

Scientific classification
- Kingdom: Animalia
- Phylum: Arthropoda
- Class: Insecta
- Order: Diptera
- Family: Tabanidae
- Subfamily: Chrysopsinae
- Tribe: Chrysopsini
- Genus: Silvius
- Species: S. alpinus

Binomial name
- Silvius alpinus (Scopoli, 1763)

Synonyms
- Tabanus alpinus Scopoli, 1763; Tabanus italicus Fabricius, 1781; Tabanus vituli Fabricius, 1805; Tabanus palpinus Palisot de Beauvois, 1819; Tabanus alpinus Drapiez, 1819; Tabanus decisus Walker, 1848; Silvius hirtus Loew, 1858

= Silvius alpinus =

Species of fly

Silvius alpinus is a species of horse fly in the family Tabanidae.

== Distribution ==
Central and Southern Europe.
