= Elaeophora =

Scientific classification
- Domain: Eukaryota
- Kingdom: Animalia
- Phylum: Nematoda
- Class: Chromadorea
- Order: Rhabditida
- Family: Onchocercidae
- Genus: Elaeophora; Railliet & Henry 1912

Type species
- Elaeophora poeli (Vryburg 1879) Railliet and Henry 1912

Species
- Elaeophora abramovi; Elaeophora bohmi; Elaeophora elaphi; Elaeophora linglingense; Elaeophora poeli; Elaeophora sagitta; Elaeophora schneideri

Genus of roundworms

Elaeophora is also a synonym for the plant genus Plukenetia.

Elaeophora is a genus of parasitic nematodes which live attached to the interior surfaces of major arteries, veins and/or heart chambers in various large mammal hosts. Infestation with Elaeophora species is referred to as elaeophorosis. The species of Elaeophora have been found in Africa, Asia, Europe, and North America. Despite the fact that they produce aneurysms in the arteries and heart of their hosts which measure up to 2 cm in diameter, overt clinical symptoms of infestation are seldom reported, with the notable exception of E. schneideri infestation in sheep, elk, and moose.

== Taxonomy ==
The type species Elaeophora poeli was first described as Filaria poeli in 1879. In 1912, the genus Elaeophora was created to distinguish this species from the other species of the genus Filaria. Elaeophora was made the senior synonym of the genera Alcefilaria and Cordophilus in 1976.

== Species ==
- Elaeophora abramovi (Oshmarin & Belous, 1951) Anderson & Bain, 1976 found in Moose (Alces alces) in Russia
- Elaeophora bohmi Supperer, 1953 found in horses in Austria and Iran;
- Elaeophora elaphi Hernandez-Rodriguez, Martinez-Gomez & Gutierrez-Palomino, 1986 found in Red Deer (Cervus elaphus) in Spain;
- Elaeophora linglingense Cheng, 1982 originally isolated from the aortic wall of cattle in Hunan Province, China. No other studies of this species have been published.
- Elaeophora poeli (Vryburg 1879) Railliet and Henry 1912 found in various cattle in Asia and Africa;
- Elaeophora sagitta (Linstow, 1907) Anderson & Bain, 1976 found in various antelope (Tragelaphus sp.), eland, and African Forest Buffalo in Africa;
- Elaeophora schneideri Wehr & Dikmans, 1935 found in various deer, sheep, elk, and moose in North America.

== General life cycle ==
Detailed life cycle studies have been reported for only one species of Elaeophora so far - E. schneideri. Microfilariae (not eggs) are shed by the adult female from her attachment site inside the lumen of the carotid artery of the definitive host. The microfilariae are carried through the blood stream and become lodged in the small capillaries of the skin in the head and facial areas. Blood-feeding horse flies ingest the microfilariae, which develop into infective larvae in the fly. The infective larvae enter a new definitive (mammal) host through the bite wound when the fly feeds again. The infective larvae migrate to secondary arterial sites, where they mature before migrating to the carotid artery. In the carotid artery, they mature into adults and reproduce sexually to produce microfilariae. It is assumed that the life cycles of other species of Elaeophora follow this general pattern.
