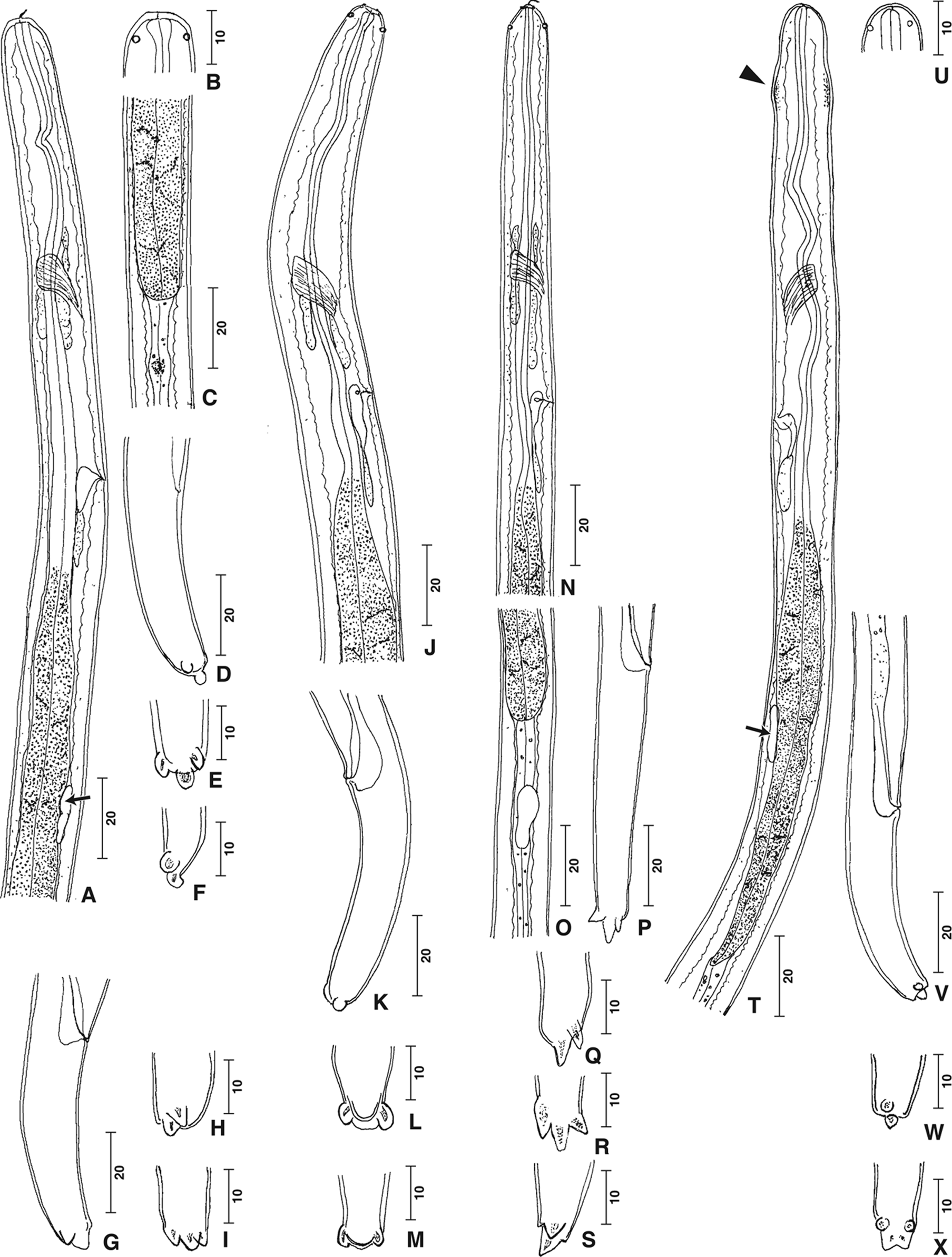
- Infective larvae of Cercopithifilaria species from ticks collected from the Japanese serow. Scale bars: micrometres.

Scientific classification
- Kingdom: Animalia
- Phylum: Nematoda
- Class: Chromadorea
- Order: Rhabditida
- Family: Onchocercidae
- Genus: Cercopithifilaria; Eberhard, 1980

= Cercopithifilaria =

Genus of worms

Cercopithifilaria is a genus of nematodes belonging to the family Onchocercidae.

The species of this genus are found in Japan, Australia.

Species:

- Cercopithifilaria bainae Almeida & Vicente, 1984
- Cercopithifilaria crassa
- Cercopithifilaria grassi (Noe, 1907)
- Cercopithifilaria japonica
- Cercopithifilaria longa
- Cercopithifilaria minuta
- Cercopithifilaria multicauda
- Cercopithifilaria roussilhoni
- Cercopithifilaria rugosicauda Bohm & Supperer, 1953
- Cercopithifilaria shohoi
- Cercopithifilaria tumidicervicata
