= Silvius pollinosus =

Scientific classification
- Kingdom: Animalia
- Phylum: Arthropoda
- Class: Insecta
- Order: Diptera
- Family: Tabanidae
- Subfamily: Chrysopsinae
- Tribe: Chrysopsini
- Genus: Silvius
- Species: S. pollinosus

Binomial name
- Silvius pollinosus Williston, 1880

Species of fly

Silvius pollinosus is a species of horse fly in the family Tabanidae.

== Distribution ==
United States
