= Litomosoides scotti =

Scientific classification
- Domain: Eukaryota
- Kingdom: Animalia
- Phylum: Nematoda
- Class: Chromadorea
- Order: Rhabditida
- Family: Onchocercidae
- Genus: Litomosoides
- Species: L. scotti

Binomial name
- Litomosoides scotti Forrester and Kinsella, 1973

Species of roundworm

Litomosoides scotti is a parasitic nematode in the genus Litomosoides. First described in 1973, it infects the marsh rice rat (Oryzomys palustris) and is known from a saltwater marsh at Cedar Key, Florida.

== See also ==
- List of parasites of the marsh rice rat

== Literature cited ==
- Forrester, D.J. and Kinsella, J.M. 1973. Comparative morphology and ecology of two species of Litomosoides (Nematoda: Filarioidea) of rodents in Florida, with a key to the species of Litomosoides Chandler, 1931 (subscription required). International Journal for Parasitology 3(2):255–263.
- Kinsella, J.M. 1988. Comparison of helminths of rice rats, Oryzomys palustris, from freshwater and saltwater marshes in Florida. Proceedings of the Helminthological Society of Washington 55(2):275–280.
