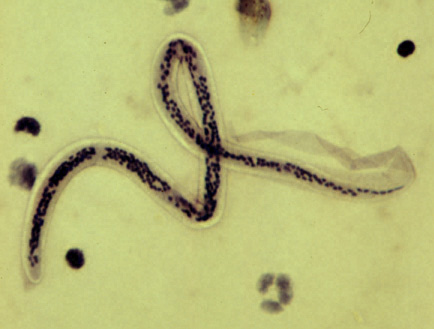
- Wuchereria bancrofti

Scientific classification
- Kingdom: Animalia
- Phylum: Nematoda
- Class: Chromadorea
- Order: Rhabditida
- Family: Onchocercidae
- Genus: Wuchereria; Silva Araugo, 1877

= Wuchereria =

Genus of roundworms

Wuchereria is a genus of nematodes belonging to the family Onchocercidae.

The species of this genus are found in Europe, Northern America, Africa.

Species:

- Wuchereria bancrofti (Cobbold, 1877)
- Wuchereria kalimantani Palmieri, Purnomo, Dennis & Marwoto, 1980.
