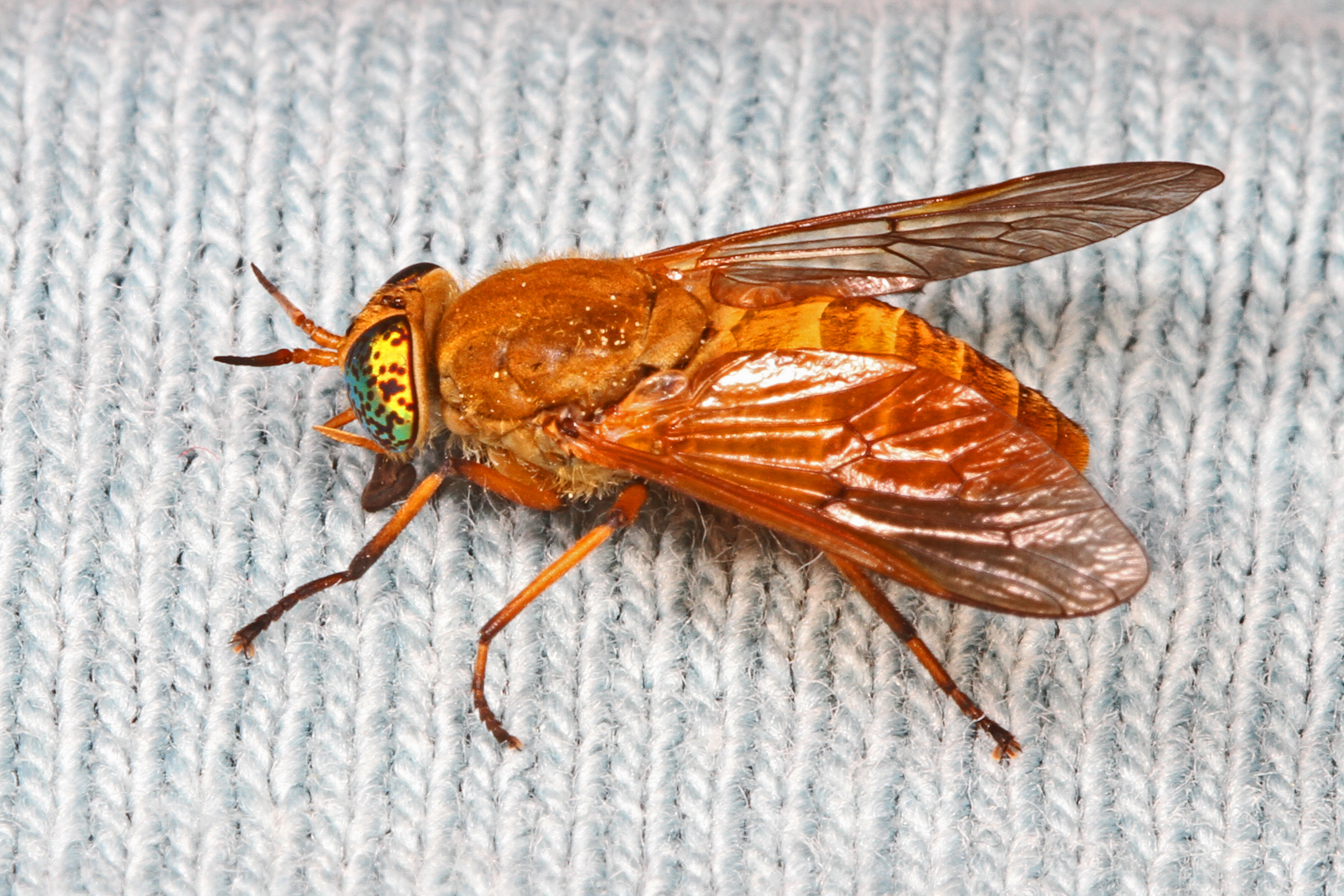

Scientific classification
- Kingdom: Animalia
- Phylum: Arthropoda
- Class: Insecta
- Order: Diptera
- Family: Tabanidae
- Subfamily: Chrysopsinae
- Tribe: Chrysopsini
- Genus: Silvius
- Species: S. gigantulus

Binomial name
- Silvius gigantulus (Loew, 1872)

Synonyms
- Chrysops gigantulus Loew, 1872; Silvius trifolium Osten Sacken, 1875

= Silvius gigantulus =

Species of fly

Silvius gigantulus is a species of horse fly in the family Tabanidae.

== Distribution ==
Canada, United States, Mexico.
