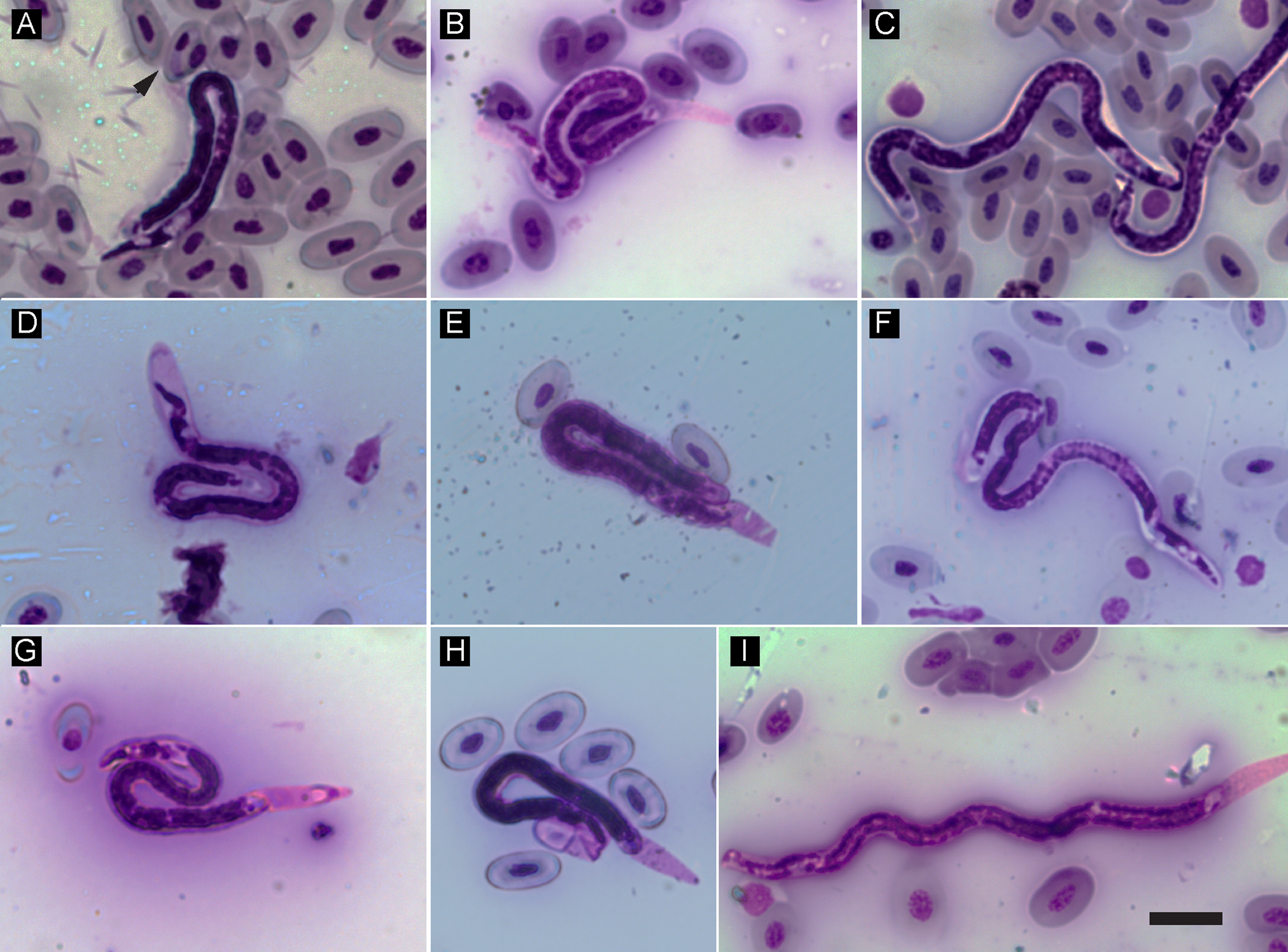
- Foleyella furcata

Scientific classification
- Kingdom: Animalia
- Phylum: Nematoda
- Class: Chromadorea
- Order: Rhabditida
- Family: Onchocercidae
- Genus: Foleyella; Seurat, 1917

= Foleyella =

Genus of roundworms

Foleyella is a genus of nematodes belonging to the family Onchocercidae.

The species of this genus are found in North America.

Species:

- Foleyella convoluta (Molin, 1858) Travassos, 1928
- Foleyella furcata
- Foleyella scalaris Travassos, 1928
- Foleyella vellardi Travassos, 1928
