= Jasper Lawrence =

British citizen and advocate of helminthic therapy

Jasper Lawrence (born 1964) is a British citizen and advocate of helminthic therapy.

After losing medical coverage and having a severe case of asthma, he travelled from Santa Cruz, California to Cameroon, and intentionally infected himself with hookworm.

When it worked, Lawrence became an advocate for helminthic therapy. He returned to the United States and founded an internet company selling hookworm kits. He came to the attention of the FDA through an ABC story, who accused him of selling pharmaceuticals without a license, and fled the United States.
