= Elaeophora abramovi =

Scientific classification
- Domain: Eukaryota
- Kingdom: Animalia
- Phylum: Nematoda
- Class: Chromadorea
- Order: Rhabditida
- Family: Onchocercidae
- Genus: Elaeophora
- Species: E. abramovi

Binomial name
- Elaeophora abramovi (Oshmarin & Belous, 1951) Anderson & Bain, 1976

Species of roundworm

Elaeophora abramovi is a nematode parasite found in the hepatic arteries of the Moose (Alces alces) in Russia.

== Discovery and nomenclature ==
This species was first described in 1951 from adults found adhering to the inner wall of the hepatic arteries of a Russian Moose (Alces alces), and named Alcefilaria abramovi. In 1974, it was transferred to the genus Cordophilus, and in 1976 it was transferred to the genus Elaeophora. Consequently, some of the older literature on this species uses the genus names Alcefilaria or Cordophilus.

== Hosts and geographic distribution ==
E. abramovi has been found in the hepatic arteries of European elk (Alces alces), Reindeer (Rangifer tarandus) and Red deer (Cervus elaphus), as discussed in. E. abramovi has only been found in Russia.

== Life cycle ==
The life cycle of E. abramovi has not been studied.
