= Elaeophora sagitta =

Scientific classification
- Kingdom: Animalia
- Phylum: Nematoda
- Class: Chromadorea
- Order: Rhabditida
- Family: Onchocercidae
- Genus: Elaeophora
- Species: E. sagitta

Binomial name
- Elaeophora sagitta (Linstow, 1907) Anderson & Bain, 1976

Species of roundworm

Elaeophora sagitta is a parasitic nematode found in the heart, coronary arteries and pulmonary arteries of several ruminant species and African buffaloes in Africa. Infestation usually occurs without significant health effects in the Greater kudu (Tragelaphus strepsiceros), but may affect cardiac function in some other host species.

== Discovery and nomenclature ==
This species was first described in 1907 from the heart of a Bushbuck (Tragelaphus scriptus) from Cameroon, and named Filaria sagitta. In 1926, it was transferred to the genus Cordophilus, as Cordophilus sagittus. In 1976, the genus Cordophilus was made a synonym of the genus Elaeophora, so this species became Elaeophora sagitta.

== Hosts and geographic distribution ==
Adults of E. sagitta have been found attached to the inner walls of the chambers and vessels of the heart, as well as the arterioles of the lungs of various hosts: Bushbuck (Tragelaphus scriptus), Greater kudu (Tragelaphus strepsiceros), bongos (Tragelaphus eurycerus), nyala (Tragelaphus angasii), common eland (Taurotragus oryx), and African Forest Buffalo (Syncerus caffer nanus). This species has also been found in unspecified "cattle". Lesions similar to those described in E. sagitta infestations were also found in sheep (Ovis aries), but the actual parasites were not recovered. E. sagitta has been found in several African nations: Cameroon, Eswatini, Kenya, Malawi, Mozambique, the Republic of the Congo, and South Africa.

== Life cycle ==
The life cycle of E. sagitta has not been studied in detail. It is viviparous, since the female sheds microfilariae, rather than eggs, directly into the blood stream.

== Prevalence ==
Infestation rates as high as 74% and over 90% have been reported in free-ranging kudu. Infestation in a herd of eland (Taurotragus oryx) in Kruger National Park was reported as "nearly half of 33" individuals. A slaughterhouse survey in Swaziland yielded a very low prevalence–77 of 18,458 (0.416%) -- of bovine hearts showing lesions typical of E. sagitta infestation. In other host species, only isolated cases have been reported.

== Clinical significance ==
E. sagitta adults are typically found in the heart ventricles, as well as coronary and pulmonary arteries, and occasionally coronary veins. They produce aneurysmal (bulging) lesions in the vessel walls which are 1–2 cm in diameter, and have been associated with hypertrophy and dilatation of heart ventricles, thrombosis (blood clots) and myocarditis (inflammation of the heart muscle). The degree of interference with general circulatory function has not been studied in detail. As one author points out, however, if the infested host is fleeing from a lion, only a minor difference in cardiopulmonary efficiency could certainly affect survival.

E. sagitta infestation appears to be clinically benign in greater kudu. Some fatalities in a herd of eland were attributed to E. sagitta infestation, though many of the eland were also "heavily" infested with various gastrointestinal parasites. In the Congo, E. sagitta infestation was suggested to be one of the factors which led to mortality in several bongos (Tragelaphus eurycerus) and one African Forest Buffalo (Syncerus caffer nanus)
