= Acanthocheilonema spirocauda =

Scientific classification
- Kingdom: Animalia
- Phylum: Nematoda
- Class: Chromadorea
- Order: Rhabditida
- Family: Onchocercidae
- Genus: Acanthocheilonema
- Species: A. spirocauda

Binomial name
- Acanthocheilonema spirocauda (Leidy, 1858) Anderson, 1992

Species of parasitic nematode

Acanthocheilonema spirocauda is a species of filarial nematode in the family Onchocercidae. It is a parasite of seals whose adult stages primarily inhabit the right atrium and ventricle of the heart and the pulmonary arteries. A. spirocauda infects several species of phocid seals, with the harbour seal among its best-studied definitive hosts. The full life cycle of A. spirocauda is not yet completely understood. The seal louse (Echinophthirius horridus) is considered a likely obligate intermediate host and vector, with larval stages of the nematode having been demonstrated within the louse.

== Taxonomy ==
Acanthocheilonema spirocauda was first described by Joseph Leidy in 1858 under the name Filaria spirocauda. The species was later transferred to Dipetalomena by Anderson in 1959. Anderson subsequently classified the organism under its current genus, Acanthocheilonema, in 1992.

== Life cycle ==
Acanthocheilonema spirocauda has a complex life cycle. The seal louse is considered the likely obligate intermediate vector.
