= Litomosoides =

Scientific classification
- Kingdom: Animalia
- Phylum: Nematoda
- Class: Chromadorea
- Order: Rhabditida
- Family: Onchocercidae
- Genus: Litomosoides; Chandler, 1931

Genus of roundworms

Litomosoides is a genus of nematodes belonging to the family Onchocercidae.

The species of this genus are found in Europe and America.

== Species ==
Species:

- Litomosoides anguyai Notarnicola, Bain & Navone, 2002
- Litomosoides bonaerensis Notarnicola, Bain & Navone, 2000
- Litomosoides brasiliensis Almeida, 1936
- Litomosoides chagasfilhoi Moraes Neto, Lanfredi & Souza, 1997
- Litomosoides chandleri Esslinger, 1973
- Litomosoides esslingeri Esslinger, 1973
- Litomosoides galizai Bain, Petit, and Diagne, 1989
- Litomosoides hamletti Sandground, 1934
- Litomosoides kohnae Bain, Petit & Diagne, 1989
- Litomosoides odilae Notarnicola and Navone, 2002
- Litomosoides scotti Forrester and Kinsella, 1973
- Litomosoides sigmodontis Chandler, 1931
- Litomosoides solarii Guerrero, Martin, Gardner and Bain, 2002
- Litomosoides spec Notarnicola, 2005
- Litomosoides taylori Guerrero and Bain, 2011
- Litomosoides ysoguazu Notarnicola & De La Sancha, 2015
- Litomosoides yutajensis Guerrero, Martin and Bain, 2003
