= Echidnophaga myrmecobii =

Scientific classification
- Kingdom: Animalia
- Phylum: Arthropoda
- Class: Insecta
- Order: Siphonaptera
- Family: Pulicidae
- Genus: Echidnophaga
- Species: E. myrmecobii

Binomial name
- Echidnophaga myrmecobii Rothschild, 1909

Species of flea

Echidnophaga myrmecobii is a flea that is native to Australia, and is commonly found on marsupials and rabbits. It is also found on European hares (Lepus europaeus), cats, and dogs.

On rabbits, the flea is most commonly found on the head and body, whereas the related flea, Echidnophaga perilis, is more often found on the feet. E. myrmecobii is a minor vector of myxomatosis between rabbits in Australia.

Adult E. myrmecobii can jump 16.5 cm high.
