= Elaeophora schneideri =

Scientific classification
- Kingdom: Animalia
- Phylum: Nematoda
- Class: Chromadorea
- Order: Rhabditida
- Family: Onchocercidae
- Genus: Elaeophora
- Species: E. schneideri

Binomial name
- Elaeophora schneideri Wehr & Dikmans, 1935

Species of roundworm

Elaeophora schneideri (arterial worm; carotid worm; cause of elaeophorosis, a.k.a. "filarial dermatitis" or "sorehead" in sheep; or "clear-eyed" blindness in elk) is a nematode which infests several mammalian hosts in North America. It is transmitted by horse-flies. Infection in the normal definitive hosts, mule deer or black-tailed deer, seldom produces clinical symptoms. In other hosts, such as sheep, elk, moose, and goats, infection with E. schneideri leads to elaeophorosis. Symptoms of elaeophorosis include necrosis of the muzzle, ears, and optic nerves; lack of coordination (ataxia); facial or lower limb dermatitis; horn deformities; blindness; and death.

== Discovery ==
Symptoms of elaeophorosis were first observed in 1933, in sheep (New Mexico) and mule deer (Utah) infested by an unknown nematode worm. Specimens were first described as Macdonaldius sp. in 1934, and later revised to Elaeophora schneideri Wehr and Dikmans, 1935. A more complete description of adults from elk, sheep and deer was published in 1968.

== Description ==
The female adults are 60–120 mm long and 56-89 μm wide, while males are 55–85 mm long and 40-68 μm wide. The microfilariae are 239-279 μm long and 11-15 μm wide.

== Hosts and life cycle ==
The normal definitive hosts for E. schneideri are the mule deer and black-tailed deer. It has also been found in several other wild mammalian hosts: white-tailed deer, elk, moose, bighorn sheep, Barbary sheep, domestic sheep. Infestation was also found in sika deer on Texas ranches. Infestations of cattle, horses or humans have not been reported. The vectors of E. schneideri are blood-feeding horse-flies of the family Tabanidae, genera Hybomitra, Tabanus, or Silvius.

Life cycle. In the normal definitive host, E. schneideri microfilariae are found in the host's skin, particularly around the forehead and poll areas. When a horse-fly feeds on an infected host, it ingests some of these microfilariae. Within a few weeks, the microfilariae develop into infective third-stage larvae (called L3) in the fly's fat body tissue and haemocoel. The mature L3 larvae migrate to the head and mouth-parts of the fly. When the fly feeds on another host, the L3 larvae enter the host's blood stream through the bite wound. They are carried throughout the host's circulatory system, and embed themselves in the walls of the leptomeningeal arteries. After a 2-week maturation period, they migrate to the carotid artery. About 4–6 months later they become sexually mature and begin to produce microfilariae. The adults live for 3–4 years. The microfilariae are released into the host's bloodstream, which carries them to the small capillaries of the skin in the head region. They become lodged in these narrow spaces, and await the next feeding horsefly.

In abnormal definitive hosts, such as sheep and elk, the adults may remain in the smaller arteries of the head and face region, instead of migrating to the carotid artery. In these smaller arteries, they obstruct blood flow to various parts of the head, face, and brain; which leads to the clinical symptoms of elaeophorosis

== Distribution ==
In the United States, E. schneideri has been reported from various wild hosts in 19 states: Arizona, Arkansas, California, Colorado, Florida, Georgia, Louisiana, Missouri, Montana, Nebraska, New Mexico, North Dakota (in imported animals), Oklahoma, South Carolina, South Dakota, Texas, Utah, Washington and Wyoming. It has also been reported from elk and black-tailed deer in Canada.

Species of Elaeophora other than E. schneideri infest various mammals in Europe, Asia and Africa. One survey of Red Deer (Cervus e. elaphus), Fallow deer (Dama dama), as well as domestic sheep, cattle and goats in Czechoslovakia yielded no specimens of E. schneideri.

== Prevalence ==
Field surveys of wild mammal populations have shown wide variation in the percentage of animals infested with E. schneideri. Surveys of all hosts in the southeastern United States generally indicate infection rates in the range of 2-15%. Prevalence rates as high as 50% in mule deer near Durango, Colorado; 78% in black tailed deer herd in Mendocino County, California, 90% in mule deer herds at high elevation sites in Arizona and New Mexico, and 100% (14 of 14 animals) in Texas mule deer have been reported. In areas of high abundance in definitive hosts, the fear of spread to commercial livestock is greatest.

== Clinical signs ==
Symptoms of Elaeophora schneideri infestation vary among the different mammalian hosts.

In the normal definitive hosts, mule deer and black-tailed deer, infestations are asymptomatic.

In the white-tailed deer, infestation is also often asymptomatic. However, blockage and thickening of coronary, cephalic, brachial and femoral arteries and sublingual food impaction have been reported in this host.

In both moose and elk, infestation can lead to fatality. Blockage of the carotid and other arteries of the head and face region by E. schneideri adults restricts local bloodflow, leading to ischemic damage to the brain, optic nerve, ears, muzzle and other facial areas. The results are often blindness; walking in circles or poor coordination (ataxia); dermatitis or gangrene of the ears, muzzle or nostrils; abnormal antler growth; or death.

In the domestic sheep, Barbary sheep, bighorn sheep, goats, and sika deer, symptoms are typically dermatological, resulting from inflammatory responses to the microfilariae which accumulate under the skin of the face and ears. The resulting lesions have been described by various authors as "dermal encrustations", "tumorous masses", "raw, bloody dermatitis", or "crusty, scabby lesions" of the head and face. Alopecia, blepharitis, and secondary conjunctivitis have also been observed in sheep. Arterial occulsion may also occur in sheep, but to a lesser degree than in moose and elk.

== Diagnosis and treatment ==
Diagnosis involves recovering either adult worms from the arteries after the death of the infested host, or microcercariae from the skin of the face or head. Treatments have been reported for sheep. A combination of tartar emetic (antimony potassium tartrate) and emetine hydrochloride healed the skin lesions. For elimination of the nematodes, fuadin (stibophen), diethylcarbamazine and piperazine hexahydrate have been suggested. However, repeated administration of diethylcarbamazine runs the risk of fatality due to accumulation of dead worms in the arteries.
