= Silvius abdominalis =

Scientific classification
- Kingdom: Animalia
- Phylum: Arthropoda
- Class: Insecta
- Order: Diptera
- Family: Tabanidae
- Subfamily: Chrysopsinae
- Tribe: Chrysopsini
- Genus: Silvius
- Species: S. abdominalis

Binomial name
- Silvius abdominalis Philip, 1954

Species of fly

Silvius abdominalis is a species of horse fly in the family Tabanidae.

== Distribution ==
United States
