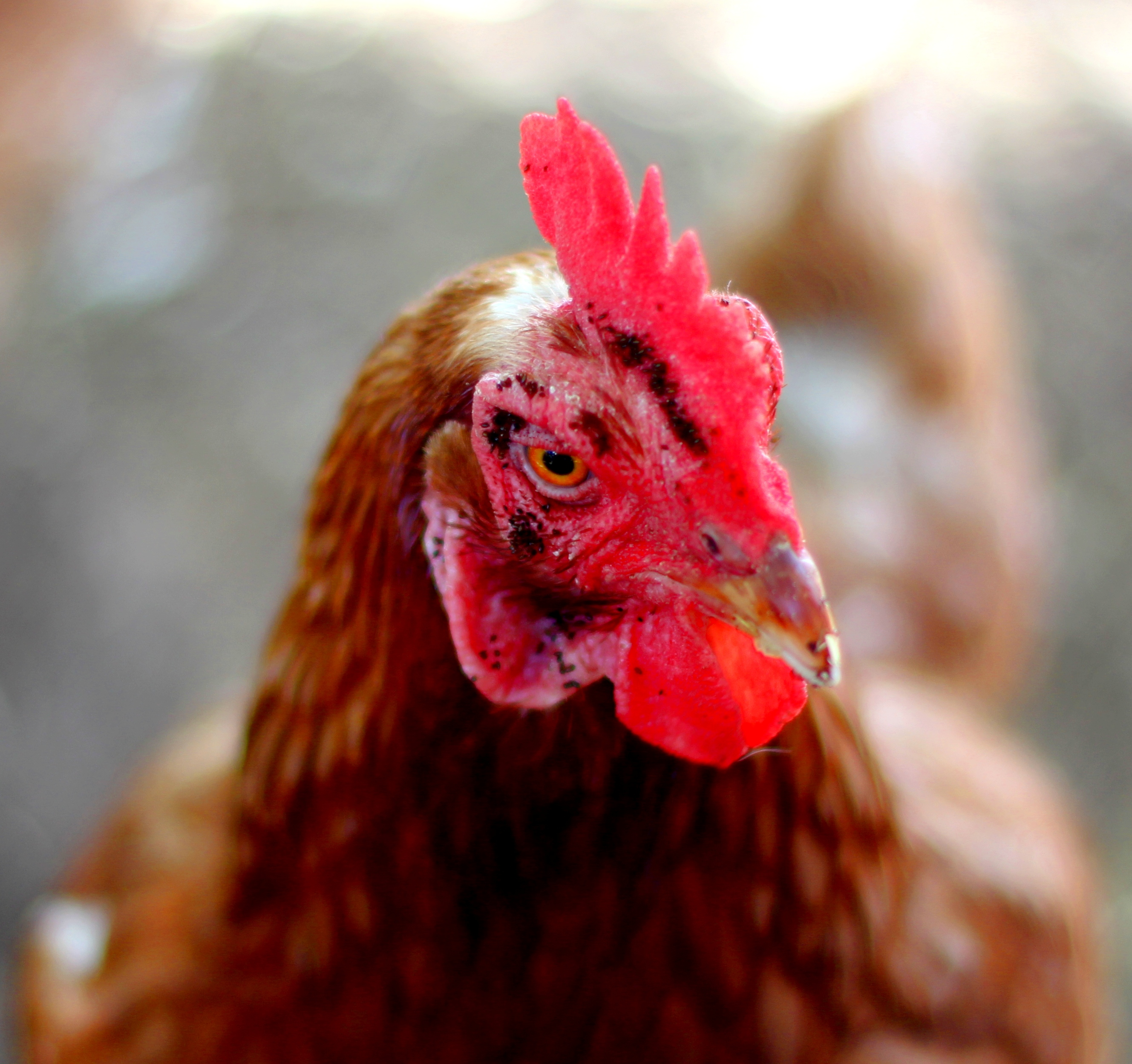
- Echidnophaga gillinacea infesting a chicken's head

Scientific classification
- Kingdom: Animalia
- Phylum: Arthropoda
- Clade: Pancrustacea
- Class: Insecta
- Order: Siphonaptera
- Family: Pulicidae
- Subfamily: Pulicinae
- Genus: Echidnophaga; Olliff, 1886

= Echidnophaga =

Genus of fleas

Echidnophaga is a genus of fleas. It includes species which are found in Africa, parts of Asia, southern Europe, and Australia. Fleas in this genus remain attached to their host in a single location for long periods of time, causing swelling and ulceration of tissue. To remain attached for long periods they use specialized mouthparts, which, compared to other fleas, are relatively much longer.

== Species ==
Encyclopedia of Life lists the following species:

- Echidnophaga aethiops Jordan et Rothschild, 1906
- Echidnophaga ambulans Olliff, 1886
- Echidnophaga aranka M. Rothschild, 1936
- Echidnophaga bradyta Jordan et Rothschild, 1906
- Echidnophaga calabyi Mardon et Dunnet, 1971
- Echidnophaga cornuta Wagner, 1936
- Echidnophaga eyrei Mardon et Dunnet, 1971
- Echidnophaga gallinacea Westwood, 1875 Found mainly on poultry, but also on a variety of birds and mammals.
- Echidnophaga iberica Ribeiro, Lucientes, Osacar et Calvete, 1994
- Echidnophaga larina Jordan et Rothschild, 1906
- Echidnophaga liopus Jordan et Rothschild, 1906
- Echidnophaga macronychia Jordan et Rothschild, 1906
- Echidnophaga murina Tiraboschi, 1903
- Echidnophaga myrmecobii Rothschild, 1909 Found on rabbits.
- Echidnophaga ochotona Li Kuei-chen, 1957
- Echidnophaga octotricha Mardon et Dunnet, 1971
- Echidnophaga oschanini Wagner, 1930
- Echidnophaga perilis Jordan, 1925 Principally found on rabbits.
- Echidnophaga popovi Ioff et Argyropulo, 1934
- Echidnophaga suricatta Hastriter, 2000
- Echidnophaga tarda Jordan, 1925
- Echidnophaga tenerifensis Gil Collado, Rodrigues et Zapatero, 1982
- Echidnophaga tiscadaea Smit, 1967
