= Chandlerella quiscali =

Scientific classification
- Kingdom: Animalia
- Phylum: Nematoda
- Class: Chromadorea
- Order: Rhabditida
- Family: Onchocercidae
- Genus: Chandlerella
- Species: C. quiscali

Binomial name
- Chandlerella quiscali Linstow, 1904

Species of roundworm

Chandlerella quiscali, also known as the Grackle nematode, is a species of filarial nematode that parasitizes the brain of several common North American birds, namely the grackle, blue jay, brown cowbird, and starling. Due to the large area covered by the combined habitats of these bird species, Chandlerella quiscali is found throughout North America. This area diversity is further aided by the fact that 98% of grackles possess this parasite, and grackles are consistently found in various North American locations.

== History ==
This species was originally called the Filaria quiscali by its discoverer, von Linstow (1904), due to pieces of the posterior ends of females removed from the area under the pia mater of the cerebrum in grackle. In 1960, this worm was incorrectly placed in the genus Splendidofilaria by Odetoyinbo and Ulmer. Due to the fact that its esophagus and cuticle don't match those of this particular genus, it had to then be removed from this group. Anderson and Freeman correctly placed this species in the genus Chandlerella in 1969, proving that von Linstow's previous naming of the worm was indeed correct.

== Effects of infection in birds ==
Birds that are infected by Chandlerella quiscali normally do not display symptoms, but those that do, do so in the form of torticollis or ataxia.
