= Sarconema (nematode) =

Scientific classification
- Kingdom: Animalia
- Phylum: Nematoda
- Class: Chromadorea
- Order: Rhabditida
- Family: Onchocercidae
- Genus: Sarconema

Genus of roundworms

Sarconema is a genus of nematodes belonging to the family Onchocercidae.

The species of this genus are found in Northern America.

Species:

- Sarconema eurycerca Wehr, 1939
- Sarconema pseudolabiata Belogurov, Daja & Sonin, 1966
