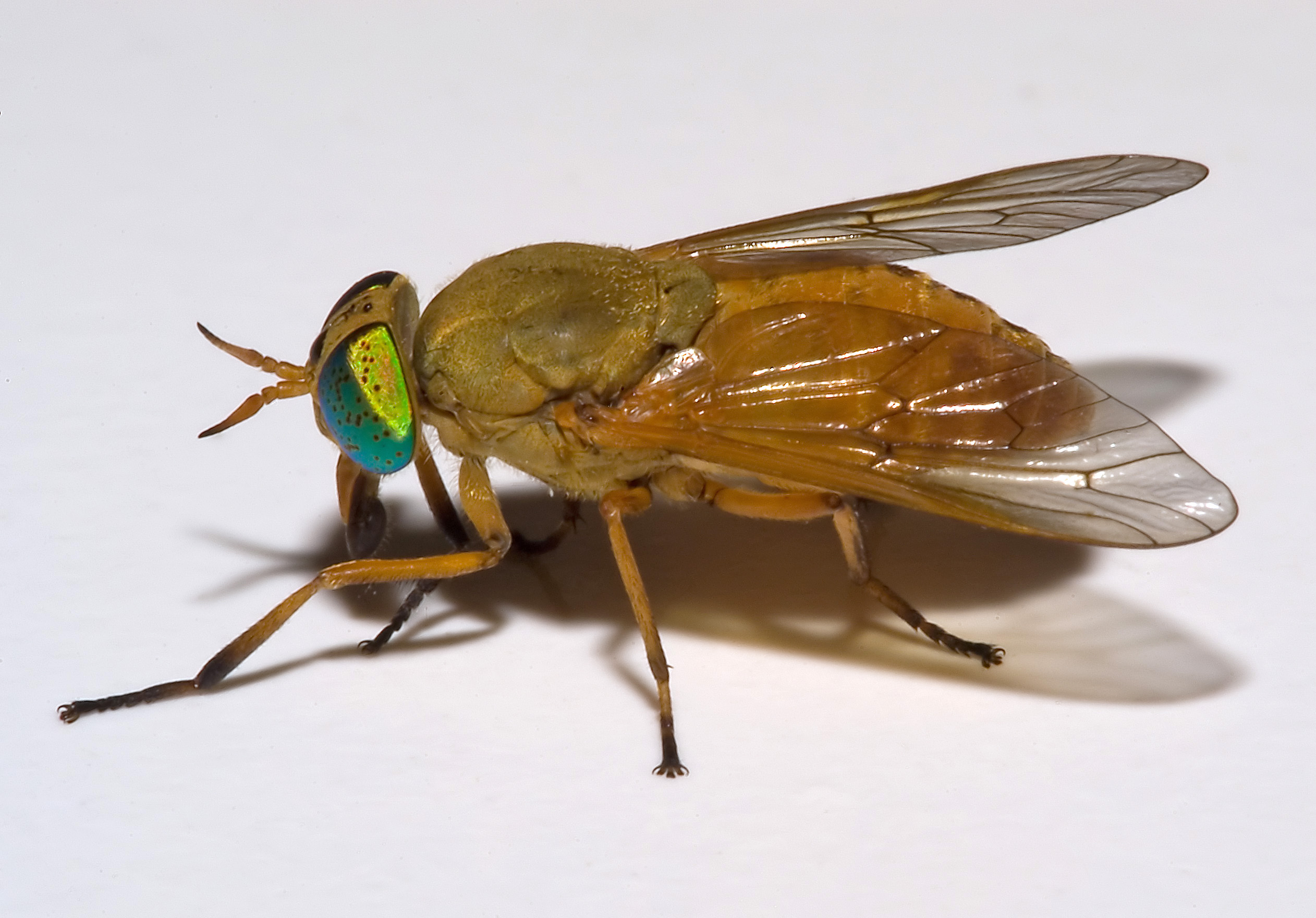
- Silvius alpinus

Scientific classification
- Kingdom: Animalia
- Phylum: Arthropoda
- Class: Insecta
- Order: Diptera
- Family: Tabanidae
- Subfamily: Chrysopsinae
- Tribe: Chrysopsini
- Genus: Silvius; Meigen, 1820

Type species
- Tabanus vituli = S. alpinus Fabricius 1805

= Silvius (fly) =

Genus of flies

Silvius is a genus of flies in the family Tabanidae.

== Species ==
- Silvius abdominalis Philip, 1954
- Silvius algirus Meigen, 1830
- Silvius alpinus (Scopoli, 1763)
- Silvius anchoricallus Chen, 1982
- Silvius appendiculatus Macquart, 1846
- Silvius aquila (Philip, 1968)
- Silvius atitlanensis Hays, 1960
- Silvius ceras (Townsend, 1897)
- Silvius ceylonicus Szilády, 1926
- Silvius chongmingensis Zhang & Xu, 1990
- Silvius confluens Loew, 1858
- Silvius cordicallus Chen & Quo, 1949
- Silvius dorsalis Coquillett, 1898
- Silvius formosensis Ricardo, 1913
- Silvius gibsoni Philip, 1958
- Silvius gigantulus (Loew, 1872)
- Silvius indianus Ricardo, 1911
- Silvius inflaticornis Austen, 1925
- Silvius jeanae Pechuman, 1960
- †Silvius laticornis Meunier, 1902
- Silvius latifrons Olsufiev, 1937
- Silvius matsumurai Kono & Takahasi, 1939
- Silvius megaceras (Bellardi, 1859)
- Silvius melanopterus (Hine, 1905)
- †Silvius merychippi Melander, 1947
- Silvius microcephalus Wehr, 1922
- Silvius notatus (Bigot, 1892)
- Silvius ochraceus Loew, 1858
- Silvius olsufjevi Burger, 1989
- Silvius omeishanensis Wang, 1992
- Silvius ornatus Philip & Mackerras, 1960
- Silvius oshimaensis Hayakawa, Takahasi & Suzuki, 1982
- Silvius peculiaris Olsufiev, 1971
- Silvius philipi Pechuman, 1938
- Silvius pollinosus Williston, 1880
- Silvius quadrivittatus (Say, 1823)
- Silvius sayi Brennan, 1935
- Silvius shirakii Philip & Mackerras, 1960
- Silvius suifui Philip & Mackerras, 1960
- Silvius tanyceras (Osten Sacken, 1886)
- Silvius variegatus (Fabricius, 1805)
- Silvius zaitzevi Olsufiev, 1941
