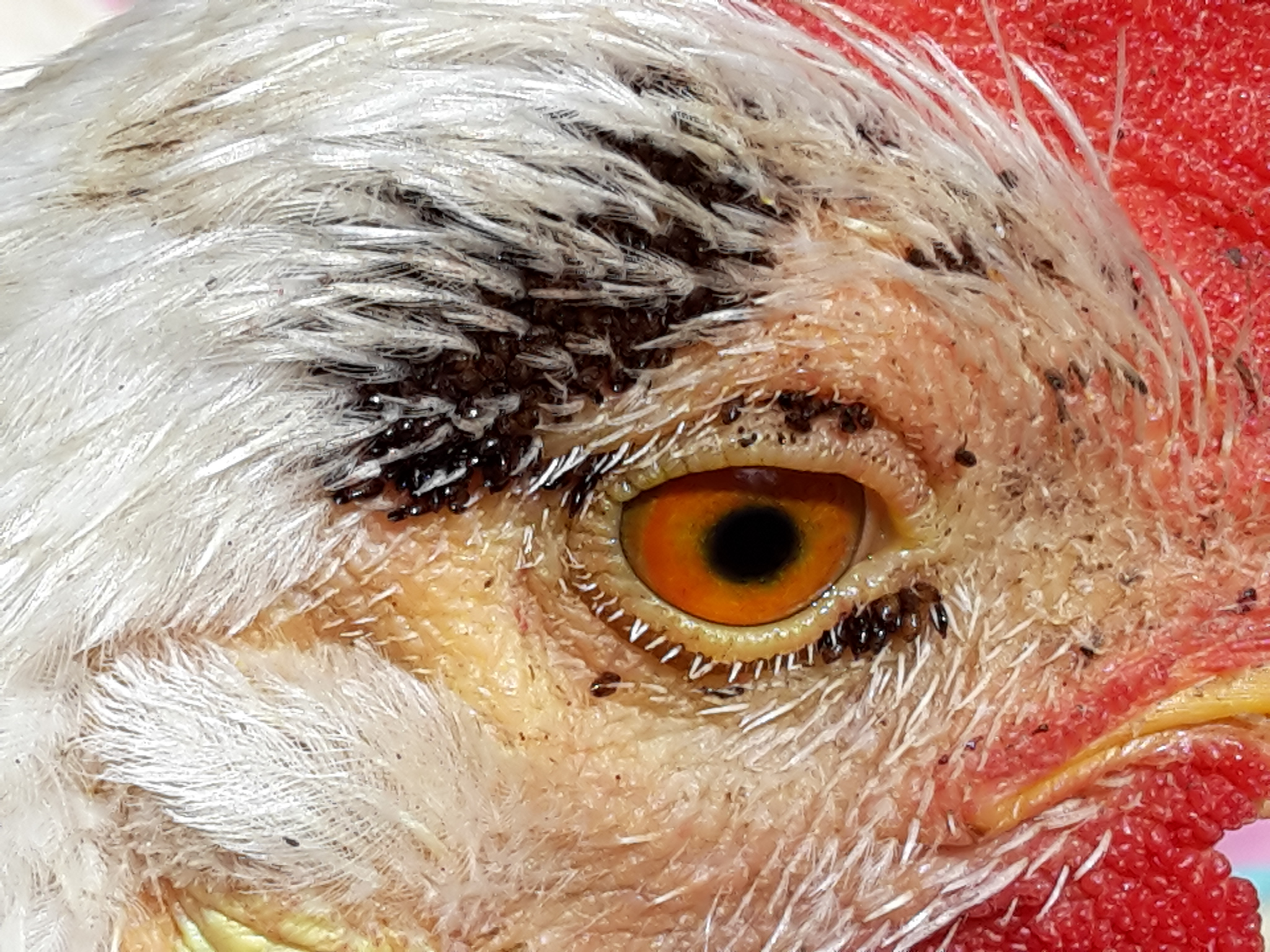
- Echidnophaga gallinacea attached to a hen's head

Scientific classification
- Kingdom: Animalia
- Phylum: Arthropoda
- Clade: Pancrustacea
- Class: Insecta
- Order: Siphonaptera
- Family: Pulicidae
- Genus: Echidnophaga
- Species: E. gallinacea

Binomial name
- Echidnophaga gallinacea (Westwood, 1875)

= Echidnophaga gallinacea =

Species of flea

Echidnophaga gallinacea, also known as the hen flea or sticktight flea, is part of the 2,500 known flea types in the Siphonaptera order. Echidnophaga gallinacea appear dark brown in colour and is a small flea measuring approximately 2 millimetres in length, which is half the size of the common cat flea. Echidnophaga gallinacea also differ in anatomy compared to the cat flea due to lacking genal and pronotal combs known as ctenidia. Echidnophaga gallinacea like all fleas, have powerful hind legs which allow the flea to jump great distances compared to its size.

Echidnophaga gallinacea do not have a single host, as they have been identified to infect a wide range of hosts including chickens, dogs and even humans.

Echidnophaga gallinacea have been documented to span across many continents ranging from North America to Australia. As farming becomes more commercialised with increasing safety and housing for animals, Echidnophaga gallinacea are spreading and infecting wildlife and rural farming impacting developing countries relying heavily on farming for food.

The reproduction of Echidnophaga gallinacea relies on the female finding and attaching to a host and feeding. Female Echidnophaga gallinacea remain attached throughout their adult life to the host. The life cycle of Echidnophaga gallinacea follows the same path as all common fleas. The eggs are laid by the female, they hatch into larvae, the larvae feed, spin a cocoon and become pupae. The pupae then develop into adults. Echidnophaga gallinacea are known to have one of the shortest lifespans of fleas.

The attachment of Echidnophaga gallinacea can cause widespread issues to the host, especially if there is a high concentration of Echidnophaga gallinacea attached to a single host. The most common problem are ulcerations of the skin and dermatitis. The excessive dermatitis of poultry has shown to cause extreme blood loss, anaemia and death.

Prevention and control of Echidnophaga gallinacea is important for farming, this can be achieved through various methods. Providing a solid concrete floor for poultry nesting will eliminate organic matter required for life cycle development. The use of pesticides both in spray form and poultry dust will provide large scale elimination of Echidnophaga gallinacea. For human infection, removal of Echidnophaga gallinacea can be done through tweezers, antihistamines and topical steroids can be applied to reduce itching and swelling.

== Anatomy and morphology ==
Fleas (Siphonaptera) such as Echidnophaga gallinacea, range from 2–6 millimetres in length and have bodies which are flattened laterally or appear compressed horizontally when viewed from above. The flea's body is designed to easily travel through hairs or feathers, allowing free movement throughout the host's body. Echidnophaga gallinacea appear dark brown macroscopically and have an angular shaped head.

Echidnophaga gallinacea are wingless insects with powerful hind legs, which facilitate jumping. The hind legs contain not only muscle, but an elastic protein known as resilin. Resilin allows Echidnophaga gallinacea to store energy within the protein pads prior to jumping. Once Echidnophaga gallinacea releases energy stored within the resilin pads, it is propelled up to 23 times its body length. E. gallinacea lacks both pronotal and genal ctenidia and has a squarish head.

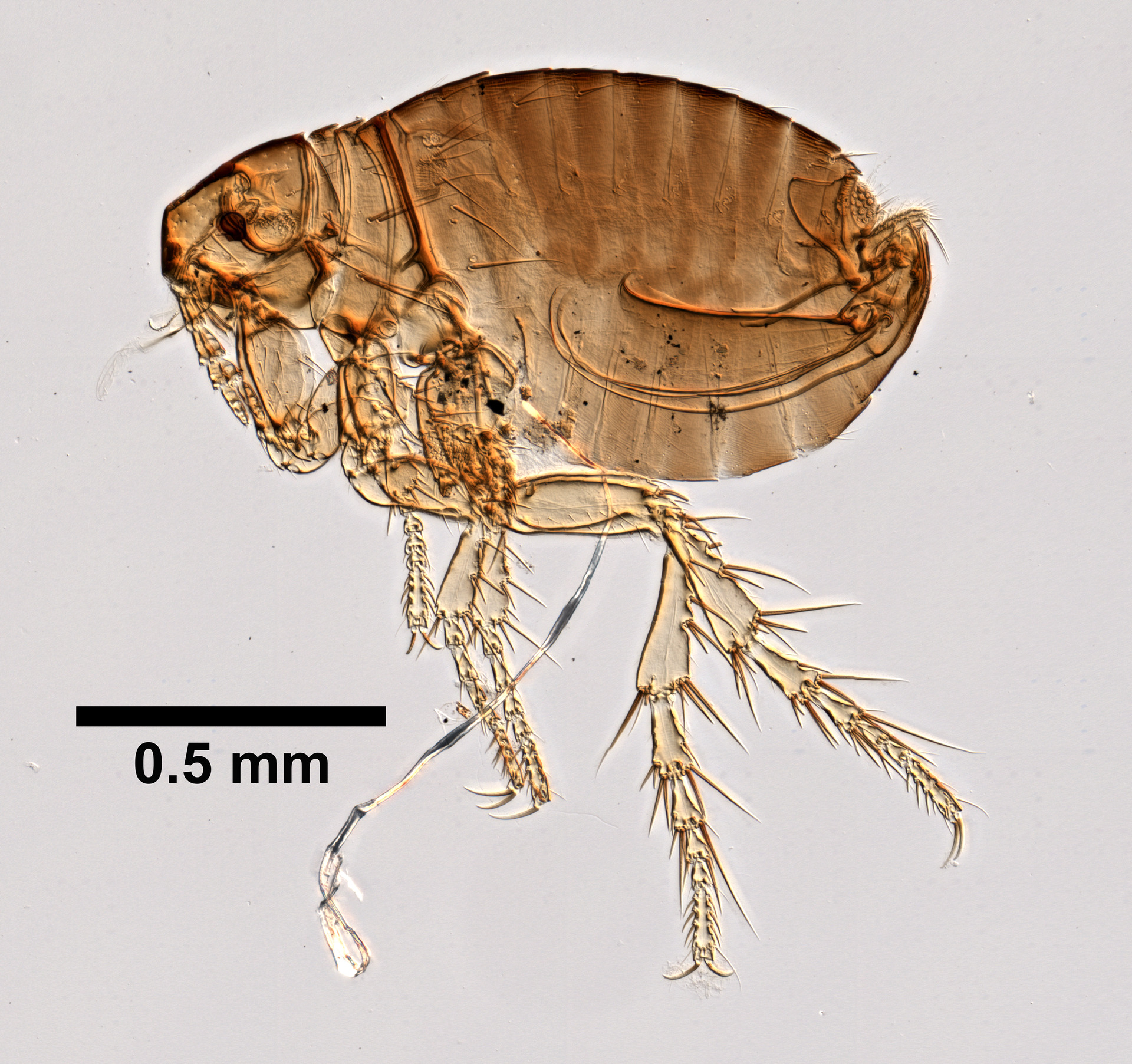
Echidnophaga gallinacea

Echidnophaga gallinacea bodies are divided into three sections: a head, thorax, and abdomen. The head of Echidnophaga gallinacea contains antennae, eyes, and a mouth. Echidnophaga gallinacea females have an elongated, serrated mouth. This feature allows them to anchor onto a host and feed for extended periods of time. Echidnophaga gallinacea differs from the common dog and cat flea by lacking combs on the back of its head, as well as having two hairs behind the antennae. The thorax of Echidnophaga gallinacea is arranged into three thoracic segments. Each segment contains a pair of legs, each leg contains backward facing spines. These spines allow Echidnophaga gallinacea to remain lodged within the host's feathers or hair even when scratched or pulled on without proper force.

== Reproduction ==
In order for a flea to produce offspring, successful mating must occur. Prior to mating, female Echidnophaga gallinacea embed themselves into the host with their elongated, serrated mouths and begin feeding, this blood meal allows the reproductive cycle to begin. Echidnophaga gallinacea prefer to embed themselves onto the bare skin of its host, typically around the head. For poultry, the areas most common to infection are near the eyes, comb and wattle. During colder periods, Echidnophaga gallinacea migrate towards areas under the wings, breast and near the cloaca.

Embedding into the host causes the female Echidnophaga gallinacea to become immobile, male fleas who remain mobile throughout life find an immobile female and begin mating. Male Echidnophaga gallinacea can freely mate with multiple females.

Female Echidnophaga gallinacea remain immobile for the remainder of their life and continue to produce eggs which can last for up to 19 days.

== Life cycle ==
=== Eggs ===
Eggs are released by the female Echidnophaga gallinacea at night, either into the ulcers created by the flea due to attachment and feeding, or they fall to the ground. The shedding of eggs onto the ground promotes an increase spread of offspring, these may be picked up by animals and transported to areas which are uncommon for infestation. An example of this is the Florida Scrub-Jay, which was found to feed amongst rural poultry and became infested in small areas causing decreased life expectancy. The physical shape of the egg allows it to travel into areas which may not always be checked providing important protection such as between cracks in floors, between cages or amongst nests.

=== Larvae ===
Larvae are able to move freely either within soil, or deep carpets and grass areas, and go through three stages known as instar. Development through the stages depends on food and environment. Larvae lack eyes and many other morphological features of fleas, however, they do contain a mouth for feeding. Echidnophaga gallinacea larvae would gravitate towards areas of high organic material and activity such as a chicken coop. As the larvae emerge from an egg, they immediately begin feeding on organic matter, for example the excrement of any animal which they are in proximity to. Larvae are negatively phototactic or move away from light and are positively geotropic or are pulled towards the earth. This means they will automatically dig deep into soil, organic matter, nests or even carpet, and spin a cocoon around themselves. These larvae which are cocooned are known as pupae.

=== Pupae ===
Pupae appear as an ovoid shape and have a sticky, loose spun cocoon which collects matter from the surroundings to help conceal it. Pupae can remain within the soil for a varying amount of time, depending on environmental conditions and it has been noted that they can remain dormant for months. If conditions are favourable, Echidnophaga gallinacea may emerge as an adult or imago after a few days.

=== Adult ===
As an adult or imago emerges from the cocoon, it has vastly different features in comparison to the pupae. For example, morphological changes resulting in the development of powerful hind legs and eyes. Echidnophaga gallinacea as an adult remains unattached to a host for the first five to eight days. The newly emerged Echidnophaga gallinacea will use common cues amongst fleas to locate a host, these are movement, body heat and carbon dioxide. If Echidnophaga gallinacea is unable to locate a host, it can survive for a small period of time. Echidnophaga gallinacea becomes parasitic when it reaches the adult phase. Only 5% of the total flea population is assumed to be in the adult phase.

== Areas of infestation ==
Echidnophaga gallinacea have been documented to exist worldwide in tropical and subtropical climates, as well as temperate zones ranging from Canada to Australia. As Echidnophaga gallinacea requires organic matter for development, the most common areas of infestation are free range, rural or backyard farms. Uninhabited areas such as marshlands, woods or nature reserves have been reported to become infested with Echidnophaga gallinacea by feeding wildlife on rural properties with poultry. Domestic animals may also become infested if in contact with backyard farming.

== Prevention, control and removal ==
There are many ways to prevent infection, or to control a possible outbreak of infestation. For example, providing a solid concrete floor for the housing of poultry animals, will cause the female Echidnophaga gallinacea to shed her eggs onto a solid floor. This will prevent the eggs from entering organic matter such as soil which is an essential requirement for development in that stage of the life cycle. Forcing poultry to roost at night within the solid concrete floor shed will stop the continuation of shedding, as most of the eggs of Echidnophaga gallinacea are shed at night.

A second example would be to inspect all animals which have been in contact or close to the area of infection and remove any which may be infected. This includes other farm animals or household pets who have been near the area.

Any animals which have been infected should have Echidnophaga gallinacea removed with tweezers by grasping the flea tightly and pulling. When the animal is free from infestation, a thin layer of petroleum jelly may be applied to inhibit further attachment and protect sores which are exposed to prevent infection occurring.

Pesticides such as maldison can also be used to eradicate Echidnophaga gallinacea. This can either be in the form of a spray for individual animals or as large-scale poultry dust which is spread throughout the shed.

All organic matter such as hay, litter and bedding must all be removed and burnt to stop Echidnophaga gallinacea from re-infesting the decontaminated area.

For removal of Echidnophaga gallinacea from humans, tweezers should be used. If there is a large infestation on a single person, maldison can be used in either liquid or gel form. Topical steroids and oral antihistamines can be used to treat symptoms of itching and help prevent damaged skin as well as reducing the chance of secondary infection. If infestation is found within soft flooring such as carpet, organophosphates may be used to kill any fleas.

== Hosts and potential issues ==
E. gallinacea is found wherever domestic chickens have been introduced, giving it a global distribution. Other common host species are domestic and wild birds, rats, dogs, and cats. Occasionally humans may be parasitised.

Echidnophaga gallinacea prefer to target host areas which are void of hair and fur, for chickens this is the eyes, comb and wattle. If left, Echidnophaga gallinacea can cause irritation to the host due to feeding, this impact can also increase due to the number of Echidnophaga gallinacea feeding on a host. The constant feeding can also cause ulcerations to the skin of the host as well as dermatitis, which can lead to excessive blood loss resulting in anaemia and death. Echidnophaga gallinacea has also been found to carry disease-causing agents such as rickettsia and bartonella.
