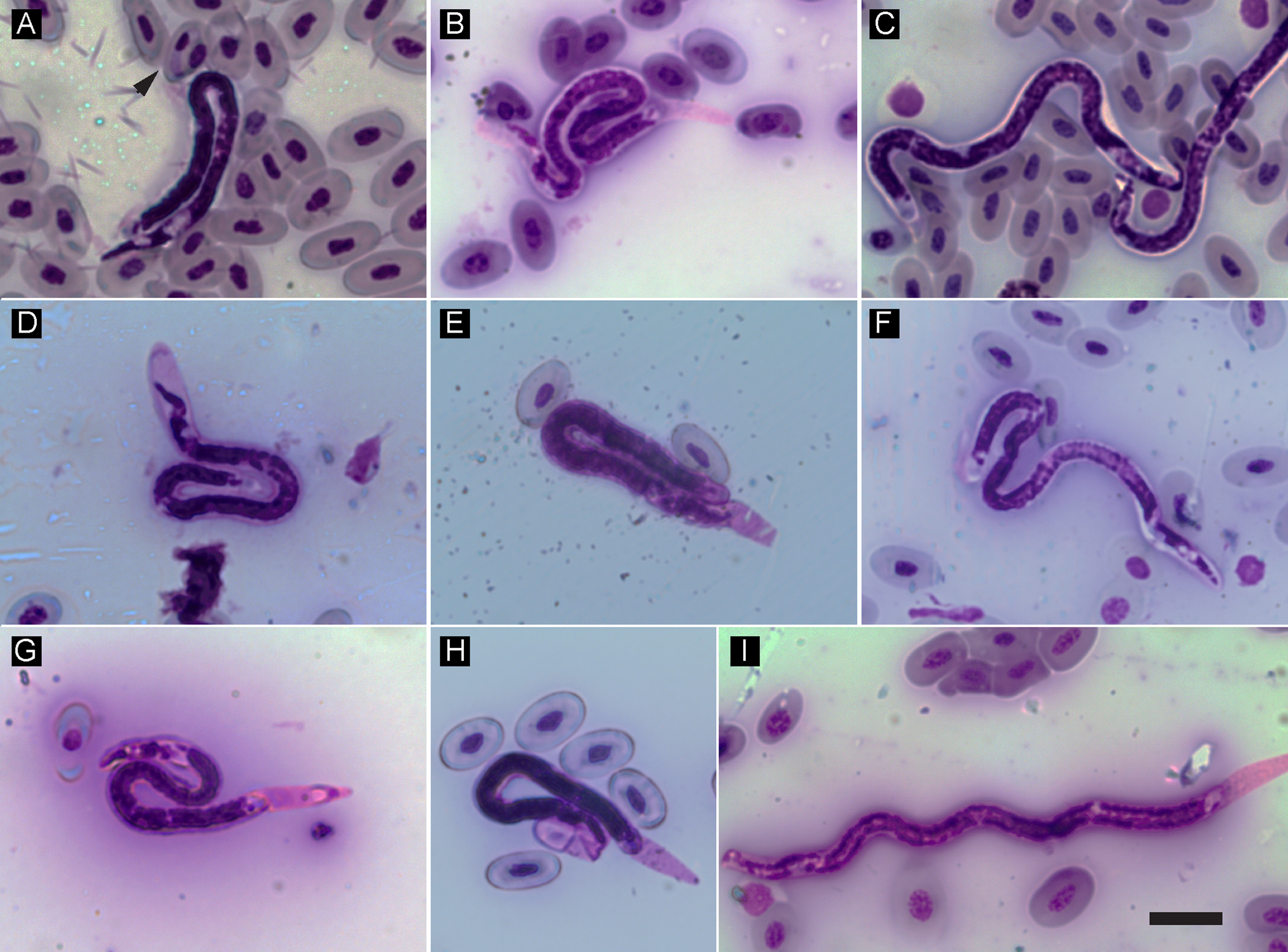
- Foleyella furcata in the blood of lizards from Madagascar

Scientific classification
- Kingdom: Animalia
- Phylum: Nematoda
- Class: Chromadorea
- Order: Rhabditida
- Superfamily: Filarioidea
- Family: Onchocercidae; Chabaud and Anderson, 1959

Genera
- See text

= Onchocercidae =

Family of roundworms

The Onchocercidae are a family of nematodes in the superfamily Filarioidea. This family includes some of the most devastating human parasitic diseases, such as lymphatic filariasis, onchocerciasis, loiasis, and other filariases.

== Representative genera and species ==
The taxonomy of nematodes in the order Spirurida is still in a state of flux, and the family Onchocercidae contains around 70–80 genera. The following genera are included in the family Onchocercidae in the Wikispecies project and the Entrez Taxonomy Browser. The latter is the taxonomic system used in the NCBI family of databases, including PubMed.

- Acanthocheilonema
  - Acanthocheilonema viteae (parasite of gerbils in Eastern Europe, Iran, and North Africa)
  - Acanthocheilonema reconditum (parasite of dogs)
  - Acanthocheilonema spirocauda (parasite of pinnipeds)
- Brugia
  - Brugia malayi (one cause of filariasis in humans)
  - Brugia pahangi (parasite of domestic cats and wild animals)
  - Brugia timori (cause of "timor filariasis" in humans)
- Breinlia
- Cercopithifilaria
  - Cercopithifilaria johnstoni (parasite of rodents and marsupials in Australia)
- Chandlerella
  - Chandlerella quiscali (parasite of birds in North America)
- Dipetalonema
  - Dipetalonema reconditum (parasite of dogs, and sometimes humans)
  - Dipetalonema repens (parasite of dogs, and sometimes humans)
- Dirofilaria
  - Dirofilaria immitis (heartworm in dogs and cats, occasionally humans)
  - Dirofilaria repens (parasite of dogs, and sometimes humans)
  - Dirofilaria tenuis (parasite of raccoons, and rarely humans)
  - Dirofilaria ursi (parasite of bears, and sometimes humans)
- Elaeophora
  - Elaeophora abramovi (parasite of moose in Russia)
  - Elaeophora bohmi (parasite of horses in Austria and Iran)
  - Elaeophora elaphi (parasite of Red Deer in Spain)
  - Elaeophora poeli (parasite of various cattle in Africa and Asia)
  - Elaeophora sagitta (parasite of several mammal groups in Africa)
  - Elaeophora schneideri (parasite of various ruminants in North America)
- Foleyella
  - Foleyella furcata (parasite of lizards)
- Litomosa
  - Litomosa westi (parasite of bats)
- Litomosoides
  - Litomosoides brasiliensis (parasite of bats)
  - Litomosoides scotti (parasite of the marsh rice rat)
  - Litomosoides sigmodontis (parasite of rodents)
  - Litomosoides wilsoni (parasite of opossums)
- Loa (see also Loa loa filariasis)
  - Loa loa
- Mansonella (see also mansonelliasis)
  - Mansonella ozzardi (parasite of man in Central and South America)
  - Mansonella perstans (parasite of humans and primates in Africa and South America)
  - Mansonella streptocerca (parasite of humans in Africa)
- Ochoterenella
  - Ochoterenella digiticauda (parasite of amphibians)
- Onchocerca
  - Onchocerca gibsoni (parasite of cattle in Asia and Australia)
  - Onchocerca gutturosa (parasite of cattle in Africa, Europe, and North America)
  - Onchocerca volvulus (parasite of humans in Africa, six countries in Latin America, and Yemen), cause of river blindness)
  - Onchocerca lupi (parasite of canines in the United States, Greece, Portugal, Germany, Hungary, Switzerland, and Canada), cause of Canine Ocular Onchocerciasis)
- Piratuba
  - Piratuba digiticauda (parasite of amphibians)
- Sarconema
  - Sarconema eurycerca (cause of heartworm in swans)
- Waltonella
  - Waltonella flexicauda (parasite of bullfrogs)
- Wuchereria
  - Wuchereria bancrofti (parasite of humans, cause of "bancroftian filariasis")
  - Wuchereria kalimantani (parasite of monkeys in Indonesia)

== See also ==
- List of parasites of humans
