= Microfilaria =

Life cycle stage of certain parasitic nematodes

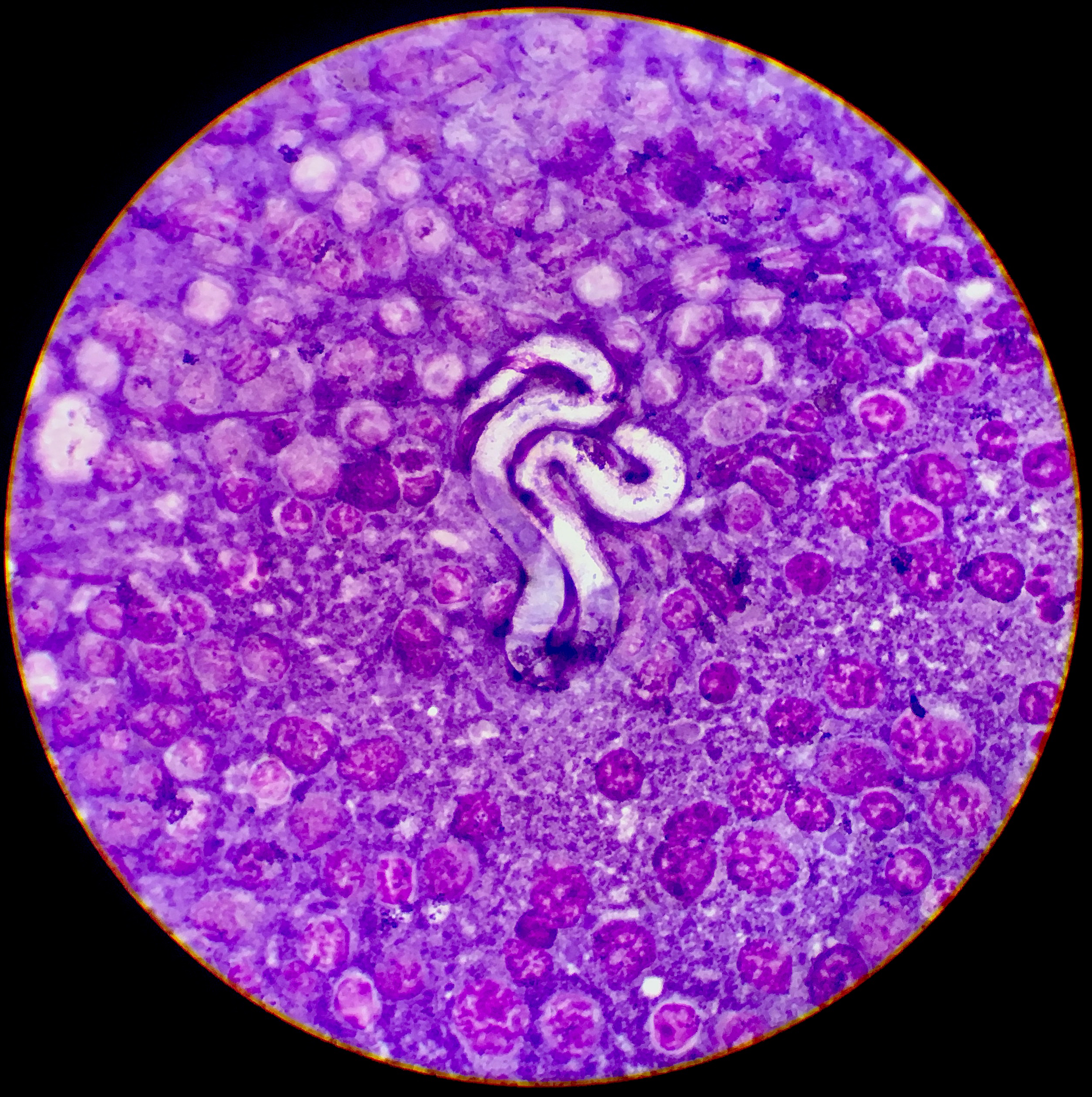
Microfilaria of Dirofilaria immitis (heartworms) in a lymph node impression smear from a dog with lymphoma. This baby nematode is snuggled down in a pillow of intermediate-to-large, immature lymphocytes, exhibiting multiple criteria of malignancy (1,000X magnification; courtesy Lance Wheeler)

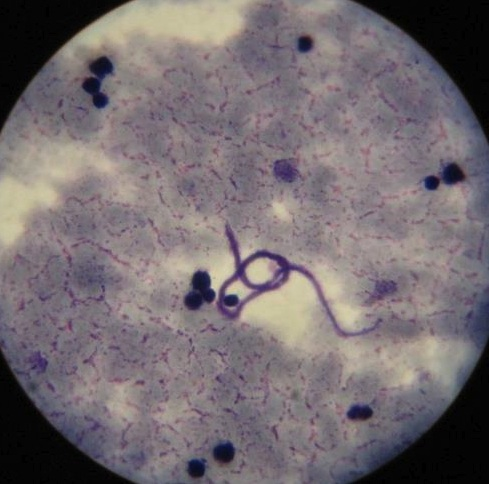
Microfilaria found in blood slides LACEN State Laboratory of Amazonas Brazil

The microfilaria (plural microfilariae, sometimes abbreviated mf) is an early stage in the life cycle of certain parasitic nematodes in the family Onchocercidae. In these species, the adults live in a tissue or the circulatory system of vertebrates (the "definitive hosts"). They release microfilariae into the bloodstream of the vertebrate host. The microfilariae are taken up by blood-feeding arthropod vectors (the "intermediate hosts"). In the intermediate host the microfilariae develop into infective larvae that can be transmitted to a new vertebrate host.

The presence of microfilariae in the host bloodstream is called "microfilaraemia". The success of filariasis eradication programs is typically gauged by the reduction in numbers of circulating microfilariae in infested individuals within a geographic area.

Microfilaria may also refer to an informal "collective group" genus name, proposed by Cobbold in 1882. While a convenient category for newly discovered microfilariae which can not be assigned to a known species because the adults are unknown, it is seldom used today.

== Escaping the circulatory system ==
All parasites need a mechanism for spreading to new individual hosts. Parasites in the lower gastrointestinal tract usually shed eggs in the host feces. Tissue-dwelling parasites, such as Trichinella spiralis (cause of trichinosis), rely on new hosts eating the tissues of their current host. For members of the family Onchocercidae whose adults live in the "closed" vertebrate circulatory system, transmission to a new host is achieved by the microfilaria stage, with the help of blood-feeding arthropod vectors.

This system is seen in the life cycle of Elaeophora schneideri. The adults of E. schneideri typically reside in the carotid artery of its parasitic life cycle's definitive host, the mule deer. The female may be up to 12 cm (almost 5 inches) long, and releases microfilariae which measure 207 by 13 μm (or 0.008 by 0.00051 inches) into the bloodstream of the host. The blood flow carries the microfilariae away from the female in the carotid artery, and directly into the branching arteries of the head and face. Because of their size, the microfilariae pass easily through successively smaller vessels, becoming physically lodged in the small capillaries near the skin surface of the face and head.

Attracted by the carbon dioxide exhaled by the mule deer, the blood-feeding female horse fly often lands on the head or face to feed. The horse fly uses its scissor-like mouthparts to cut the surface of the skin, creating a pool of blood which it takes in through its sucking mouthparts. The microfilariae, which were just under the surface of the skin, are small enough to be ingested whole by the horse fly. Once inside the horse fly, the microfilariae bore through the stomach wall, and mature into infective larvae about two weeks later. These larvae migrate to the head and mouthparts of the horse fly, and enter the bloodstream of another vertebrate host when the horse fly feeds again.

== Microfilaria as a developmental stage ==
Most recent parasitology textbooks consider the microfilariae to be "pre-larvae or advanced embryos" which will develop into the first stage larvae (L1) in the arthropod vector (p. 364). Some consider them to be the first larval stage, such as "microfilariae; i.e. first larva (= L1)" (p. 361).

In either case, the microfilaria is the stage which develops from the egg. In most tissue-dwelling species the eggs hatch in the uterus of the female, and the unsheathed microfilariae are released. In most blood-dwelling species, embryonated eggs (or, microfilariae which are said to be sheathed in the envelope of the egg) are released; and they will only exsheath ("hatch") after being ingested by the arthropod intermediate host. All microfilariae burrow through the stomach wall after being eaten by the arthropod host, and develop into infective third stage (L3) larvae.

Many of the organs of microfilariae are in a very early stage of development. For some species, the developmental fates of individual cells have been followed from the microfilaria stage to the adult worm. The microfilariae of many species undergo a development phase called the "sausage stage", becoming temporarily shorter and thicker, while the first-stage (L1) larval organs develop.

In some species of Onchocercidae (roundworms), the release of microfilariae by the adult female is periodic—occurring daily at a particular time of the day or night. This timing increases the chance that they will be picked up by a blood-feeding arthropod vector, which are often more active at certain times of the day.
