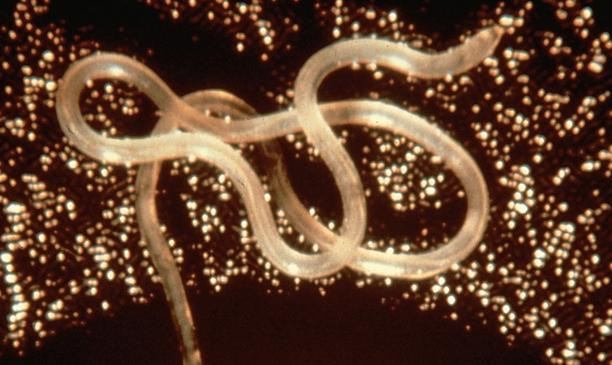
- Adult Loa loa filarial worm

Scientific classification
- Kingdom: Animalia
- Phylum: Nematoda
- Class: Chromadorea
- Order: Rhabditida
- Infraorder: Spiruromorpha
- Superfamily: Filarioidea; Chabaud & Anderson, 1959

Families
- Filariidae; Mesidionematidae; Onchocercidae; Setariidae

= Filarioidea =

Superfamily of roundworms

The Filarioidea are a superfamily of highly specialised parasitic nematodes. Species within this superfamily are known as filarial worms or filariae (singular filaria). Infections with parasitic filarial worms cause disease conditions generically known as filariasis. Drugs against these worms are known as filaricides.

== Introduction ==
Filarioidea all are specialised parasites and the definitive host is always a vertebrate, a mammal, bird, reptile or amphibian, but not a fish. The intermediate host is always an arthropod.

Most of Filarioidea parasitise wild species, birds in particular, but some, especially in the family Onchocercidae, attack mammals, including humans and some domestic animals. Conditions that result from parasitism by Onchocercidae include some of the most troublesome diseases of the warmer regions, including river blindness and elephantiasis.

== Taxonomy ==
The Filarioidea include several families:

- Aproctidae
- Filariidae
- Onchocercidae (sometimes included within the Filariidae)
- Setariidae

== Filarioidea and disease ==
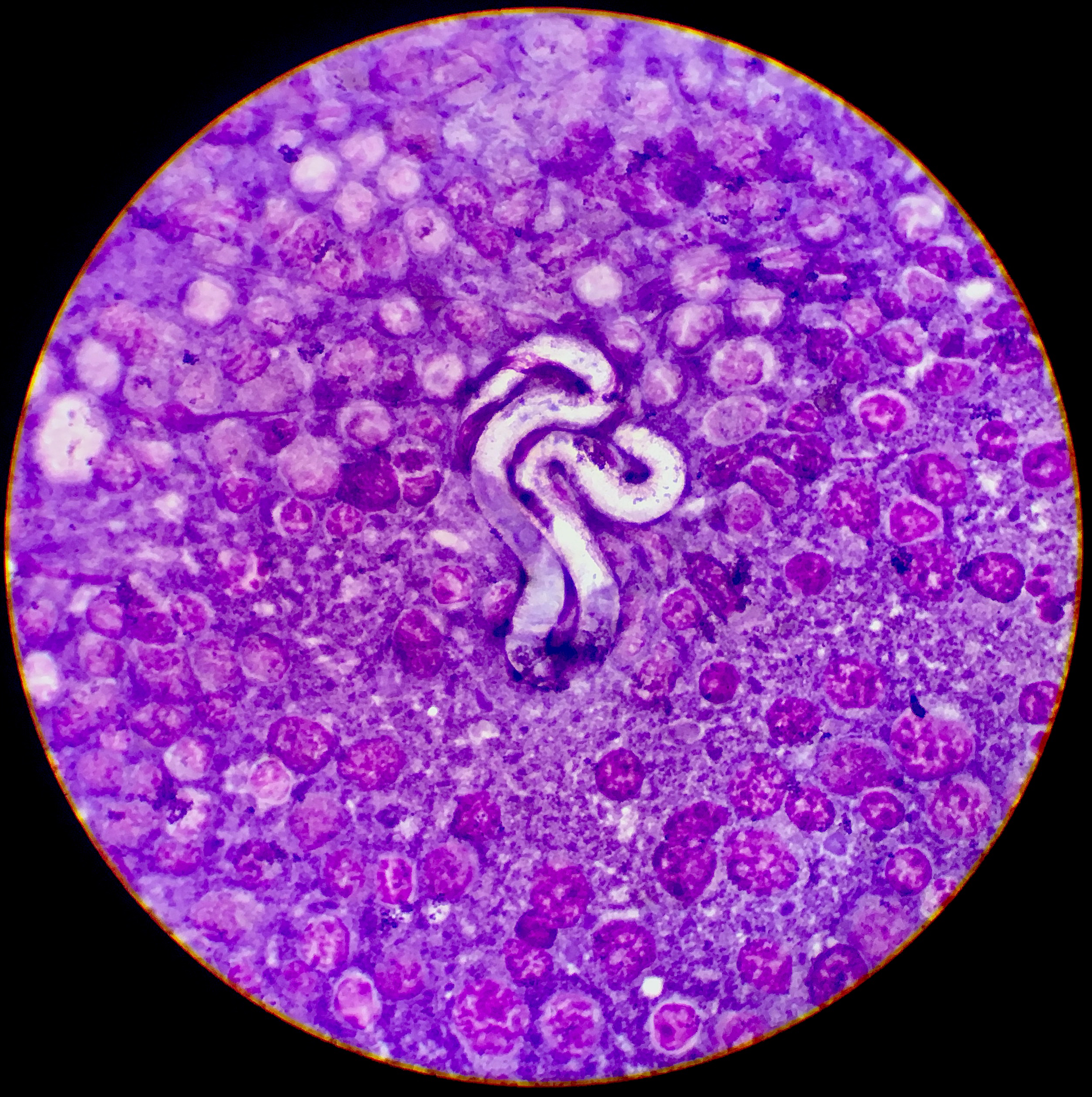
Microfilaria of Dirofilaria immitis (heartworms) in a lymph node of a dog with lymphoma. This baby nematode is in a pillow of intermediate-to-large, immature lymphocytes exhibiting multiple criteria of cancer.

In and about endemic regions filarial diseases have been public health concerns throughout recorded history. Archaeological evidence for elephantiasis for example extends back some 3000 years, by which time apparently it already was no novelty. Currently perhaps some hundreds of millions of people worldwide, mainly in tropical regions, are infected with pathogenic species of filariae. Where the diseases are endemic many times more are exposed routinely to infection. Some victims harbour more than one medically significant infection simultaneously and this can complicate diagnosis and treatment.

Humankind is the definitive host of at least eight species of filariae in various families. Six are particularly significant in medical terms. The ones that mainly occupy lymph vessels and cause conditions such as adenolymphangitis, elephantiasis, and filarial fever are:

- Brugia malayi
- Brugia timori
- Wuchereria bancrofti

Three other medically important parasitic species are:

- Loa loa causes Loa loa filariasis also known as Calabar swelling
- Mansonella streptocerca, which causes streptocerciasis, an itchy condition that creates depigmented skin lesions sometimes mistaken for the first signs of leprosy.
- Onchocerca volvulus causes cutaneous onchocerciasis and river blindness

The other two are less seriously pathogenic but commonly parasitise humans.

- Mansonella ozzardi
- Mansonella perstans

Some Dirofilaria species usually parasitize animals such as dogs, but occasionally infect humans as well. They are not well adapted to humans as hosts and seldom develop properly though they may cause various confusing symptoms.

Various filarial diseases specific to humans are candidates for elimination by such means as breaking the cycle of infection. To eliminate the vectors is not really practical, but if the human population were sufficiently cleared of parasites by treatment with filaricides then one year without any human reservoirs of infection should suffice to exterminate the parasite. That is the intention of for example, the Global Programme to Eliminate Lymphatic Filariasis, which aims to interrupt transmission in that way.

== Life cycle of Filarioidea ==
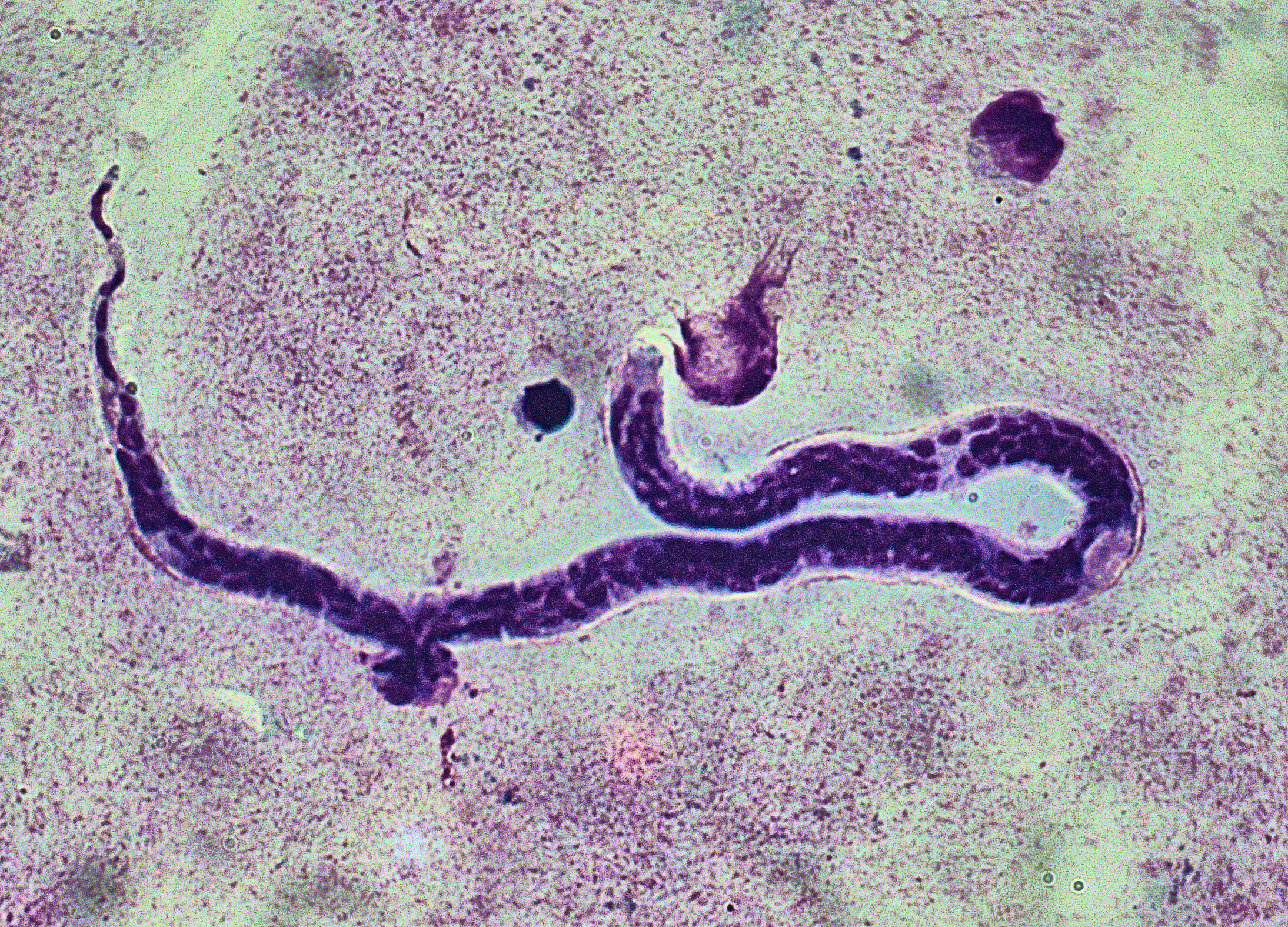
Whole blood with microfilaria worm, from a person with Loa loa, Giemsa stain

The mature worms live in the body fluids and cavities of the definitive hosts, or predominantly in particular tissues. Details vary according to species. Some of the worst pathogens invade lymphatic vessels and may be numerous enough to clog them. Some species invade deep connective tissues; some infest subcutaneous connective tissue, causing unbearable itching. Some invade the lungs or serous cavities such as the pleural cavity, or pericardial cavity. Wherever established, they may survive for years, the fertilized females continuously producing motile embryos called microfilariae rather than eggs.

A microfilaria cannot reproduce in the definitive host and cannot infect another definitive host directly, but must make its way through the host's body to where an intermediate host that acts as a vector can swallow it while itself acting as an ectoparasite to the definitive host. It must succeed in invading its vector organism fairly soon, because, unlike adult filarial worms, microfilariae only survive for a few months to a year or two depending on the species and they develop no further unless they are ingested by a suitable blood-feeding female insect.

In the intermediate host the microfilaria can develop further till the vector conveys it to another definitive host. In the new definitive host the microfilaria complete the final stage of development into sexual maturity; the process takes a few months to a year or more depending on species. The mature filaria then must mate before a female can produce the next generation of microfilariae, so that invasion by a single worm cannot produce an infection. Accordingly, it takes years of exposure to infections before a serious disease condition can develop in the human host.

Once a new generation of microfilariae is released in the primary host, those in turn must seek out host tissue suited to the nature of the vector species. For example, if the vector is a skin-piercing fly such as a mosquito the microfilaria must enter the peripheral blood circulation, whereas species borne by skin-rasping flies such as Simuliidae and skin-cutting flies such as Tabanidae tend to establish in hypodermal tissues. For obscure reasons, some such species actually undergo daily migrations to bodily regions favoured by the vector ectoparasites. Outside those periods they take refuge in blood circulation of the lungs.
