= Mazzotti =

Mazzotti is a surname. Notable people with the surname include:

- Adriano Sauro Lorenzo Mazzotti (born 1966), director of South African company Carnilinx (Pty) Ltd.
- José Antonio Mazzotti, Peruvian poet, scholar, and literary activist
- Lisa Mazzotti (born 1965), Italian voice actor
- Pascal Mazzotti (1923–2002), French actor

== See also ==
- Mazzotti Reaction, a symptom complex seen in tropical medicine
