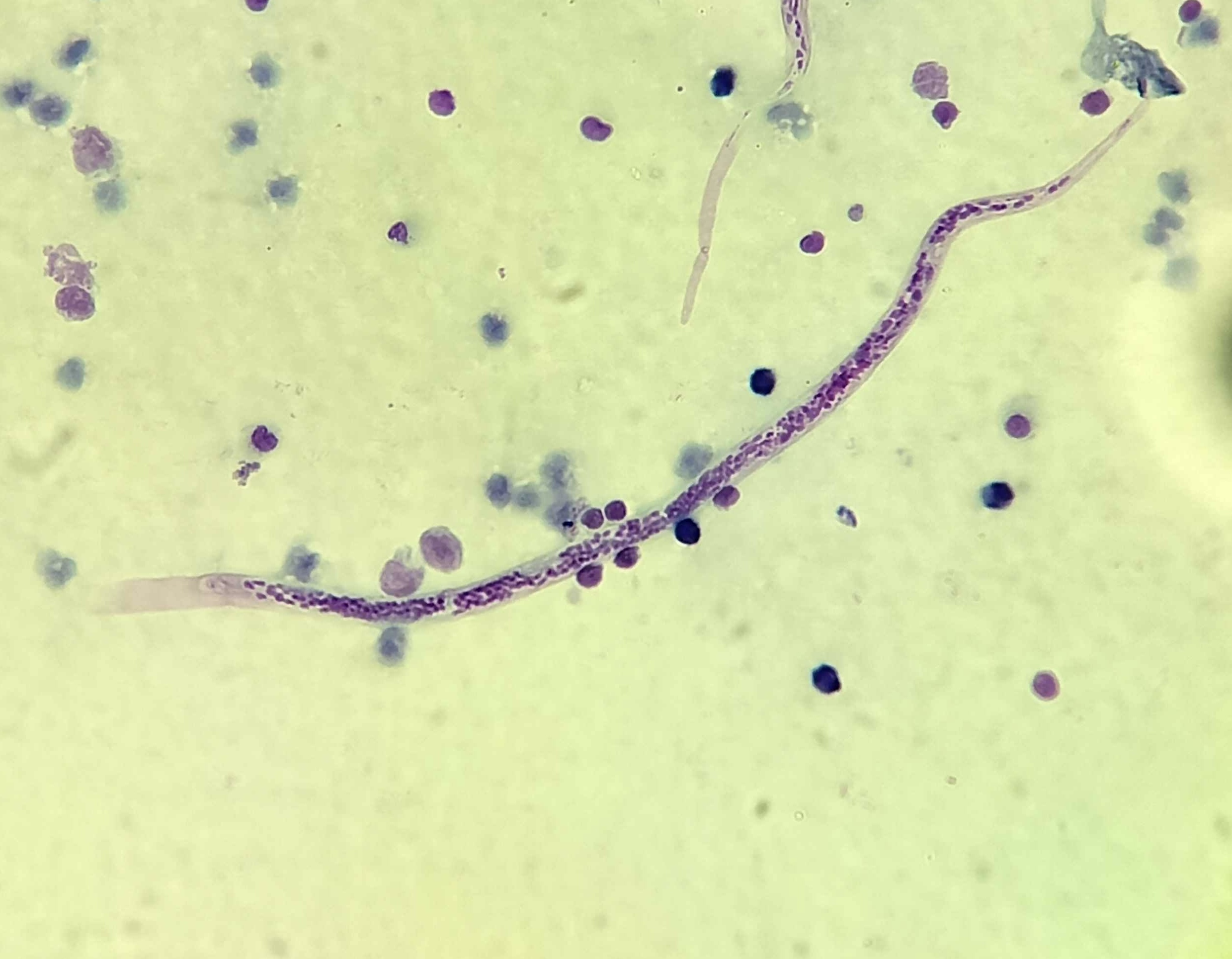
- B. malayi, blood smear, Giemsa stain

Scientific classification
- Kingdom: Animalia
- Phylum: Nematoda
- Class: Chromadorea
- Order: Rhabditida
- Family: Onchocercidae
- Genus: Brugia
- Species: B. malayi

Binomial name
- Brugia malayi S.L. Brug, 1927

= Brugia malayi =

Species of filarial nematode

Brugia malayi is a filarial (arthropod-borne) nematode (roundworm), one of the three causative agents of lymphatic filariasis in humans. Lymphatic filariasis, also known as elephantiasis, is a condition characterized by swelling of the lower limbs. The two other filarial causes of lymphatic filariasis are Wuchereria bancrofti and Brugia timori, which both differ from B. malayi morphologically, symptomatically, and in geographical extent.

B. malayi is transmitted by Mansonia mosquitoes and is restricted to South and Southeast Asia. It is one of the tropical diseases targeted for elimination by the year 2020 by the World Health Organization, which has spurred vaccine and drug development, as well as new methods of vector control.

== Signs and symptoms ==
Brugia malayi
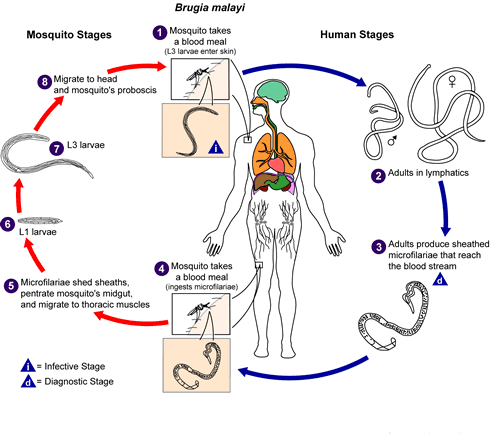
- The life cycle of Brugia malayi.
- Specialty: Infectious disease

B. malayi is one of the causative agents of lymphatic filariasis, a condition marked by infection and swelling of the lymphatic system. The disease is primarily caused by the presence of worms in the lymphatic vessels and the resulting inflammatory response of the host. Signs of infection are typically consistent with those seen in Bancroftian filariasis—fever, lymphadenitis, lymphangitis, lymphedema, and secondary bacterial infection—with a few exceptions.

=== Lymphadenitis ===
Lymphadenitis, the swelling of the lymph nodes, is a commonly recognized symptom of many diseases. It is an early manifestation of filariasis, usually occurs in the inguinal area during B. malayi infection and can occur before the worms mature.

=== Lymphangitis ===
Lymphangitis is the inflammation of the lymphatic vessels in response to infection. It occurs early in the course of infection in response to worm development, molting, death, or bacterial and fungal infection. The affected lymphatic vessels become distended and tender, and the overlying skin becomes erythematous and hot. Abscess formation and ulceration of the affected lymph node occasionally occurs during B. malayi infection, more often than in Bancroftian filariasis. Remnants of adult worms can sometimes be found in the ulcer drainage.

=== Lymphedema ===
The most obvious sign of infection, elephantiasis, is the enlargement of the limbs–usually the legs. A late complication of infection, elephantiasis is a form of lymphedema and is caused by repeated inflammation of the lymphatic vessels. Repeated inflammatory reactions causes vessel dilation and thickening of the affected lymphatic vessels, which can compromise function. The lymphatic system normally functions to maintain fluid balance between tissues and the blood and serves as an integral part of the immune system. Blockage of these vessels due to inflammatory induced fibrosis, dead worms, or granulomatous reactions can interfere with normal fluid balance, thus leading to swelling in the extremities. Elephantiasis resulting from B. malayi infection typically affects the distal portions of the extremities. Unlike Bancroftian filariasis, B. malayi rarely affects genitalia and does not cause funiculitis, orchitis, epididymitis, hydrocele, or chyluria, conditions more often observed with Bancroftian infection.

=== Secondary bacterial infection ===
Secondary bacterial infection is common among patients with filariasis. Compromised immune function due to lymphatic damage in addition to lymph node ulcerations and abscesses exposure and impaired circulation due to elephantiasis can cause secondary bacterial or fungal infection. Elephantiasis, in addition to the physical burden of a swollen limb, can be a severely debilitating condition given bacterial infection. Part of the WHO's "Strategy to Eliminate Lymphatic Filariasis" targets hygiene promotion programs in order to alleviate the suffering of affected individuals (see Prevention Strategies).

However, clinical manifestations of infection are variable and depend on several factors, including host immune system, infectious dose, and parasite strain differences. Most infections appear asymptomatic, yet vary from individual to individual. Individuals living in endemic areas with microfilaremia may never present with overt symptoms, whereas in other cases, only a few worms can exacerbate a severe inflammatory response.

The development of the disease in humans, however, is not well understood. Adults typically develop worse symptoms, given the long exposure time required for infection. Infection may occur during childhood, but the disease appears to take many years to manifest. The incubation period for infection ranges from 1 month to 2 years and typically microfilariae appear before overt symptoms. Lymphedema can develop within six months and development of elephantiasis has been reported within a year of infection among refugees, who are more immunologically naive. Men tend to develop worse symptoms than women.

== Hosts ==
Hosts of B. malayi include Southeast Asian cats.

== Cause ==
=== Life cycle ===
Development and replication of B. malayi occurs in two discrete phases: in the mosquito vector and in the human. Both stages are essential to the life cycle of the parasite.

Mosquito: The mosquito serves as a biological vector and intermediate host – it is required for the developmental cycle and transmission of B. malayi.
4. The mosquito takes a human blood meal and ingests microfilariae (worm-like sheathed eggs) that circulate in the human blood stream.
5-7 In the mosquito, the microfilariae shed sheaths, penetrate the midgut, and migrate to the thoracic muscles were the microfilariae increase in size, molt, and develop into infective larvae (L1 and L3) over a span of 7–21 days. No multiplication or sexual reproduction of microfilariae occurs in the mosquito.
8-1 The infective larvae (L3) migrate to the salivary glands, enter the proboscis and escape onto human skin when the mosquito takes another blood meal.

Human: B. malayi undergoes further development in the human as well as sexual reproduction and egg production.
1-2 The infective larvae (L3) actively penetrate the skin through the bite hole and develop into adults in the lymphatic system over a span of 6 months. Adult worms can survive in the lymphatic system for 5–15 years
3. The male and female adult worms mate and the females produce an average of 10,000 sheathed eggs (microfilaria) daily The microfilariae enter the blood stream and exhibit nocturnal periodicity and subperiodicity.
4. Another mosquito takes a blood meal and ingests the microfilariae. Infection depends on the mosquito taking a blood meal during a periodic episode – when microfilariae are present in the bloodstream.

=== Morphology ===
==== Adult ====
Adult worms resemble typical nematode roundworms. Long and threadlike, B. malayi and other nematode possess only longitudinal muscles and move in an S-shape motion. Adults are typically smaller than adult W. bancrofti, though few adults have been isolated. Female adult worms (50 mm) are larger than male worms (25 mm).

==== Microfilariae ====
B. malayi microfilariae are 200–275 µm in length and have a round anterior end and a pointed posterior end. The microfilariae are sheathed, which stains heavily with Giemsa. The sheath is actually the egg shell, a thin layer that surrounds the egg shell as the microfilariae circulates in the bloodstream. The microfilariae retain the sheath until they are digested in the mosquito midgut.

B. malayi microfilariae resemble W. bancrofti and Loa loa microfilariae with minor differences that can aid in laboratory diagnosis. B. malayi microfilariae can be distinguished by the noncontinuous row of nuclei found in the tip of the tail. There are two terminal nuclei that are distinctly separated from the other nuclei in the tail, whereas the tail of W. bancrofti contains no nuclei and Loa loa microfilariae nuclei form a continuous row in the tail. B. malayi microfilariae also have a characteristic cephalic space ratio of 2:1.

=== Spread ===
B. malayi is transmitted by a mosquito vector. The principal mosquito vectors include Mansonia, Anopheles, and Aedes mosquitoes. The geographical distribution of the disease is thus dependent on suitable mosquito breeding habitat.

- The nocturnal periodic form is transmitted by Mansonia and some anopheline mosquitoes in open swamps and rice growing areas. These mosquitoes tend to bite at night and appear to only infect humans. Natural animal infections are rare and experimental animals do not retain infection.
- The nocturnal subperiodic form is transmitted by Mansonia in forest swamps, where mosquitoes bite in the shade at any time. Natural zoonotic infections are common. Cats, dogs, monkeys, slow lorises, civet cats, and hamsters have all been successfully experimentally infected with B. malayi from man and may serve as important reservoirs.

The accumulation of many infective mosquito bites – several hundreds to thousands – is required to establish infection. This is because a competent mosquito usually transmits only a few infective L3 larvae (see Life cycle), and less than 10% of those larvae progress through all the necessary molting steps and develop into adult worms that can mate. Thus those at greatest risk for infection are individuals living in endemic areas—short term tourists are unlikely to develop lymphatic filariasis.

== Diagnosis ==
Tender or enlarged inguinal lymph nodes or swelling in the extremities can alert physicians or public health officials to infection.

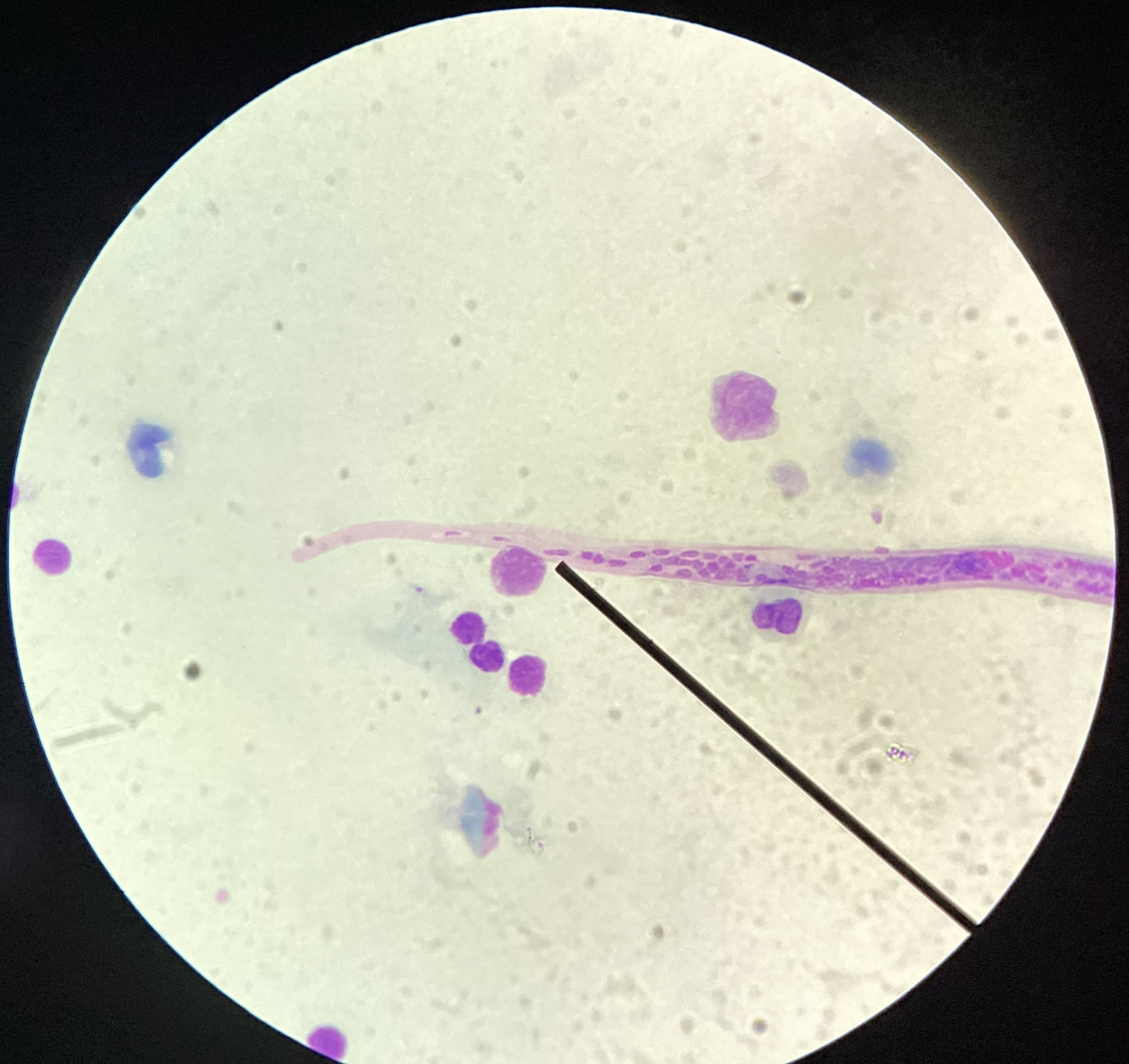
Brugia malayi tail, showing two terminal nuclei

With appropriate laboratory equipment, microscopic examination of differential morphological features of microfilariae in stained blood films can aid diagnosis—in particular the examination of the tail portion, the presence of a sheath, and the size of the cephalic space. Giemsa staining will uniquely stain B. malayi sheath pink. However, finding the microfilariae on blood films can be difficult because of the nocturnal periodicity of some forms of B. malayi.

PCR based assays are highly sensitive and can be used to monitor infections both in humans and the mosquito vectors. However, PCR assays are time-consuming, labor-intensive and require laboratory equipment. Lymphatic filariasis mainly affects the poor, who live in areas without such resources.

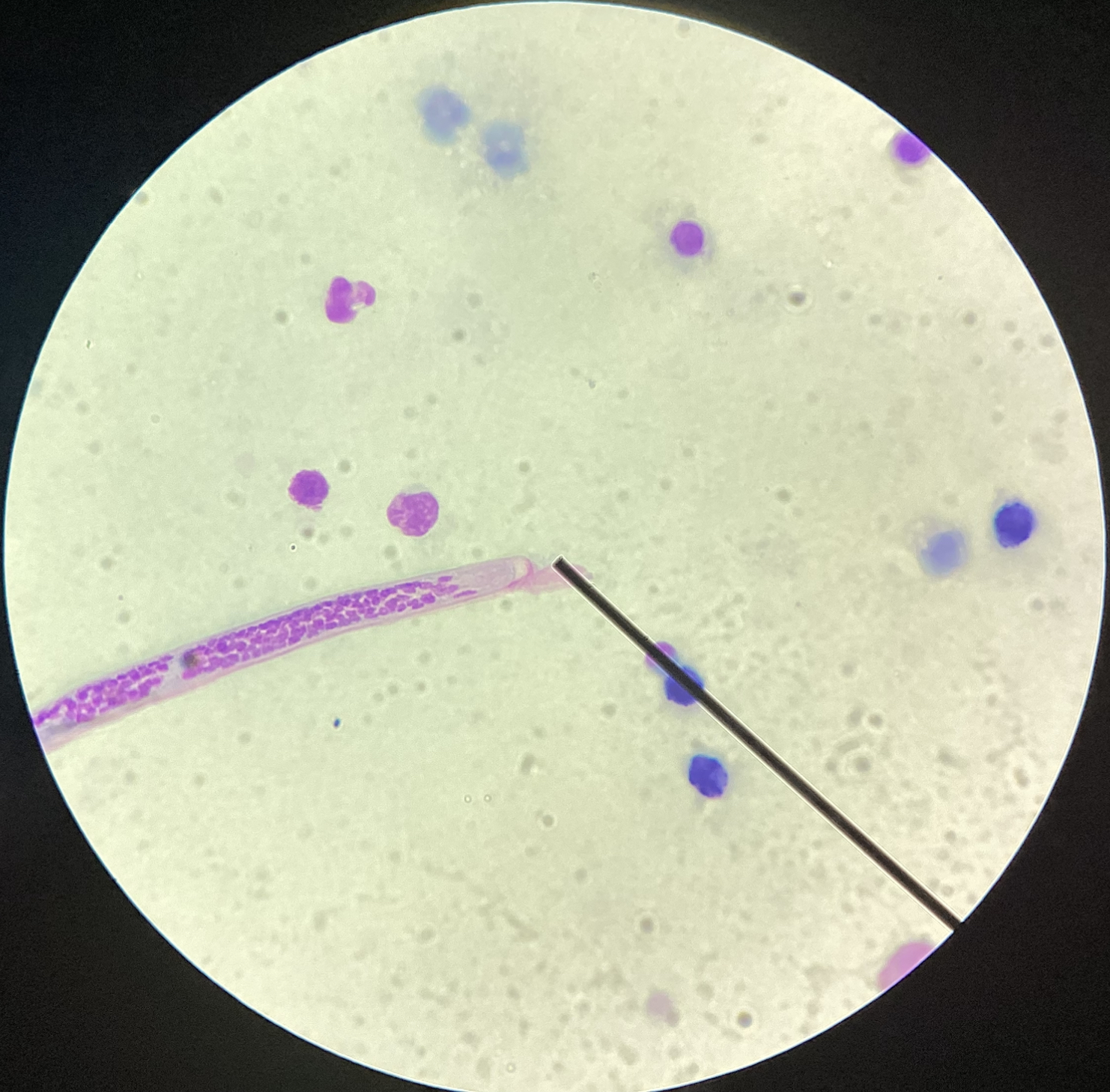
Brugia malayi head, showing long cephalic space (width: length ratio 2:1)

The ICT antigen card test is widely used in the diagnosis of W. bancrofti, but commercial antigens of B. malayi have not been widely available. However, new research developments have identified a recombinant antigen (BmR1) that is both specific and sensitive in the detection of IgG4 antibodies against B. malayi and B. timori in an enzyme-linked immunosorbent assay and an immunochromatographic rapid dipstick (Brugia Rapid) test. However, it appears that immunoreactivity to this antigen is variable in individuals infected with other filarial nematodes. This research has led to the development of two new rapid immunochromatographic IgG4 cassette tests – WB rapid and PanLF rapid – which detect Bancroftian filariasis and all three species of lymphatic filariasis, respectively, with high sensitivity and selectivity.

== Prevention ==
=== Vaccines ===
There is currently no licensed vaccine to prevent lymphatic filariasis. However, recent research has produced vaccine candidates with good results in experimental animals. A glutathione-S-transferase, a detoxification enzyme in parasites isolated from Setaria cervi, a bovine filarial parasite, reduced B. malayi adult parasite burden by more than 82% for 90 days after treatment.

=== Vector control ===
Vector control has been effective in virtually eliminating lymphatic filariasis in some regions, but vector control combined with chemotherapy produces the best results. It is suggested that 11 to 12 years of effective vector control may eliminate lymphatic filariasis. Successful methods of B. malayi vector control include residual house spraying using DDT and insecticide treated bednets. Mansonia larvae attach their breathing tubes to underwater roots and plants in order to survive. While chemical larvicides have only provided partial control, plant removal could prevent vector development, but also potential adverse effects on the aquatic environment. Lymphatic filariasis vector control is neglected in comparison to the far more established efforts to control malaria and dengue vectors. Integrated vector control methods should be applied in areas where the same mosquito species is responsible for transmitting multiple pathogens.

== Management ==
The Global Alliance to Eliminate Lymphatic Filariasis was launched by the World Health Organization in 2000 with two primary goals: 1) to interrupt transmission and 2) to alleviate the suffering of affected individuals. Mass drug treatment programs are the main strategy for interrupting parasite transmission, and morbidity management, focusing on hygiene, improves the quality of life of infected individuals.

=== Drugs ===
A goal of community-based efforts is to eliminate microfilariae from the blood of infected individuals in order to prevent transmission to the mosquito. This is primarily accomplished through the use of drugs. The treatment for B. malayi infection is the same as for Bancroftian filariasis. Diethylcarbamazine has been used in mass treatment programs as an effective microfilaricidal drug in several locations, including India. While diethylcarbamazine tends to cause adverse reactions like immediate fever and weakness, it is not known to cause any long-term adverse drug effects. It has been shown to kill both adult worms and microfilariae. In Malaysia, diethylcarbamazine dosages (6 mg/kg weekly for 6 weeks; 6 mg/kg daily for 9 days) reduced microfilariae by 80% for 18–24 months after treatment in the absence of mosquito control. Microfilariae numbers slowly return many months after treatment, thus requiring multiple drug doses over time in order to achieve long-term control. However, it is not known how many years of mass drug administration is required to eliminate transmission. there have been any confirmed cases of diethylcarbamazine resistance as of 2007.

Single doses of two drugs (albendazole-diethylcarbamazine and albendazole-ivermectin) have been shown to remove 99% of microfilariae for a year after treatment and help to improve elephantiasis during early stages of the disease. Ivermectin, while not lethal to adult Brugia malayi worms, functions as an effective, less toxic microfilaricide. It disrupts the function of the excretory-secretory apparatus in microfilariae, essential for their survival and immune evasion.

Since the discovery of the importance of Wolbachia bacteria in the life cycle of B. malayi and other nematodes, novel drug efforts have targeted the endobacterium. Tetracyclines, rifampicin, and chloramphenicol have been effective in vitro by interfering with larvae molting and microfilariae development. Tetracyclines have been shown to cause reproductive and embryogenesis abnormalities in the adult worms, resulting in worm sterility. Clinical trials have demonstrated the successful reduction of Wolbachia and microfilariae in onchocerciasis and W. bancrofti infected patients. These antibiotics, while acting through a slightly more indirect route, are promising antifilarial drugs.

=== Hygiene ===
Secondary bacterial infection is often observed with lymphatic filariasis. Rigorous hygiene practices, including washing with soap and water daily and disinfecting wounds can help heal infected surfaces, and slow and potentially reverse existing tissue damage. Promoting hygiene is essential for lymphatic filariasis patients given the compromised immune and damaged lymphatic systems and can help prevent suffering and disability.

=== Preventative chemotherapy ===
The World Health Organization (WHO) recommends preventive chemotherapy as a key strategy to eliminate lymphatic filariasis. This involves mass drug administration (MDA), where entire at-risk populations are treated annually with safe medicine combinations. The medicines used in MDA are primarily effective against the microfilariae, the immature larvae of the parasite, and have limited effects on the adult worms.

== Epidemiology ==
B. malayi infects 13 million people in south and southeast Asia and is responsible for nearly 10% of the world's total cases of lymphatic filariasis. B. malayi infection is endemic or potentially endemic in 16 countries, where it is most common in southern China and India, but it also occurs in Indonesia, Thailand, Vietnam, Malaysia, the Philippines, and South Korea. The distribution of B. malayi overlaps with W. bancrofti in these regions, but does not coexist with B. timori. Regional foci of endemicity are determined in part by the mosquito vectors

== History ==
=== Distinct parasite ===
B. malayi was discovered in 1927 by the Dutch parasitologist Steffen Lambert Brug (1879–1946) (who is commonly known in the scientific literature as S.L. Brug) while working in Indonesia. It was similar to another filarial roundworm Wuchereria bancrofti (then called Filaria (Microfilaria) bancrofti). But the new species of human filaria in North Sumatra was both physiologically and morphologically distinct from the W. bancrofti microfilariae commonly found in Jakarta. Based on their resemblance and differences, the new species was named Filaria malayi. Despite epidemiological studies identifying Filaria malayi in India, Sri Lanka, China, North Vietnam, and Malaysia in the 1930s, Lichtenstein and Brug's hypothesis was not accepted until the 1940s, when Rao and Mapelstone identified two adult worms in India.

Based on the similarities with W. bancrofti, Rao and Mapelstone proposed to call the parasite Wuchereria malayi. After the discovery of new species such as W. pahangi (now B. pahangi) in 1956, and W. patei (now B. patei) in 1958, the scientific classification was reassessed in 1960. Buckley proposed to divide the old genus Wuchereria, into two genera, Wuchereria and introduced a new Brugia after the original discoverer. Then Wuchereria contains only W. bancrofti, which so far has been found to infect only humans, and the genus Brugia contains B. malayi, which infects humans and animals, as well as other zoonotic species.

=== Different strains ===
In 1957, two subspecies of human infecting B. malayi were discovered by Turner and Edeson in Malaysia based on the observation of different patterns of microfilaria periodicity. Periodicity refers to a pronounced peak in microfilariae count during a 24‑hour interval when microfilariae are present and detectable in the circulating blood. The basis for this phenomenon remains largely unknown.

- Nocturnal periodicity: microfilariae are not detectable in the blood for the majority of the day, but the microfilarial density peaks between midnight and 2 AM nightly.
- Nocturnal subperiodicity: microfilariae are present in the blood at all times, but appear at greatest density between noon and 8 PM.

== Research ==
In 2007, scientists sequenced the genome of Brugia malayi. Identifying the genes of this organism might lead to development of new drugs and vaccines.

To decipher the genome, "Whole Genome Shotgun Sequencing" was performed. The genome was found to be approximately 90-95 megabases in size. The results of the sequencing were then compared to those of the reference nematode Caenorhabditis elegans, along with its prototype Caenorhabditis briggsae. These two free-living nematodes were incorporated in the study and were important for several reasons:

- comparing genomes using C. elegans allowed for the identification of similar linkages in genes
  - the researchers found a genomic conservation with an absence of conservation at a more local gene level
    - this demonstrated that rearrangements had occurred over time between the C. elegans and B. malayi and allowed researchers to identify genes or proteins that were specific to B. malayi
    - these unique genes were significant because they could have led to the parasitism seen in B. malayi, and therefore are potential targets for future studies
- gene linkages offer insight into the evolutionary trend of parasitic genes that could yield clues to further explain their unique ability to successfully survive for many years in humans

=== New medications ===
Sequence comparisons between the two genomes allow for mapping of C. elegans orthologs to B. malayi genes. By using orthology mappings (between C. elegans and B.malayi) and incorporating the extensive genomic and functional genomic data, including genome-wide RNAi screens that already exist for C. elegans, potentially essential genes in B. malayi can be identified. Scientists are hoping to be able to target these genes as potential new targets for drug treatments. The longevity of this parasite complicates treatment because most existing drugs target the larvae and thus do not kill adult worms. The drugs often must be taken periodically for years, and the worms can cause a massive immune reaction when they die and releases foreign molecules in the body. Drug treatments for filariasis have not changed significantly in over 20 years, and with the risk of resistance rising, there is an urgent need for the development of new anti-filarial drug therapies. From the genome sequence, several metabolic pathways have been identified, containing dozens of gene products that may be helpful in the discovery of more targeted and effective drug therapies.

- possible new drug targets include:
  - molting
  - nuclear receptors
  - collagens and collagen processing
  - neuronal signaling
  - the B. malayi kinome
  - reliance on host (B. malayi) and endosymbiont (Wolbachia) metabolism

These potential new targets for drugs or vaccines may provide new opportunities for understanding, treating and preventing elephantiasis.

=== Relationship with Wolbachia ===
The relationship between the Wolbachia bacteria and B. malayi is not fully understood. Extrapolating from research done with Wuchereria bancrofti, another nematode that causes filariasis, Wolbachia may aid in embryogenesis of the worm, be responsible for potent inflammatory responses from macrophages and filarial disease, and be linked to the onset of lymphedema and blindness sometimes associated with B. malayi infections. In a study done by the University of Bonn in Ghana, doxycycline effectively depleted Wolbachia from W. bancrofti. It is likely that the mechanism of doxycycline is similar to that in other filarial species, i.e., a predominant blockade of embryogenesis, leading to a decline of microfilariae according to their half-life. This could render doxycycline treatment an additional tool for the treatment of microfilaria-associated diseases in Bancroftian filariasis, along with B. malayi fiariasis. The course of treatment with doxycycline could be much shorter as it would make the adult worm sterile in one shot rather than repeatedly have to target the replenished larvae that current treatments kill, and there would be fewer side effects for the infected individual.

=== Transplant research ===
Another hopeful use for the research is in the area of transplant research. Because the B. malayi genome is the first parasitic genome to have been sequenced, the implications on the mechanism of parasitism in humans are crucial to understand. According to Alan L. Scott, Ph.D., a collaborator at Johns Hopkins University, understanding how a particular parasite, such as B. malayi, can adapt to humans, may yield medical benefits far beyond treating elephantiasis. According to the author, "This worm can reside in the host for years and not necessarily cause disease, in fact the less disease the individual has, the more worms there are in circulation. Now that we know those genes don't exist in humans we can target them to control disease." Some of the predicted proteins for these new genes appear similar to known immuno-modulator proteins, regulators of the immune system, suggesting that they are involved in deactivating the host's immune system to ensure the parasite remains undetected. Knowledge of these previously unknown immune suppressors could also be of use in organ transplants and to help treat autoimmune disease.

According to the Filarial Genome Project being done by The Special Programme for Research and Training in Tropical Diseases, the Brugia malayi MIF gene is expressed in all life-cycle stages of the parasite, and results suggest that B. malayi MIF may interact with the human immune system during the course of infection by altering the function of macrophages in the infected individual. Studies are currently testing the hypothesis that MIF may be involved in reducing the host's immune response to the microfilariae. Understanding how this particular parasite has adapted to humans may help organ transplant researchers by figuring out how to prevent the immune system from attacking the transplanted tissue.

== See also ==
- List of parasites (human)
- Tropical eosinophilia
