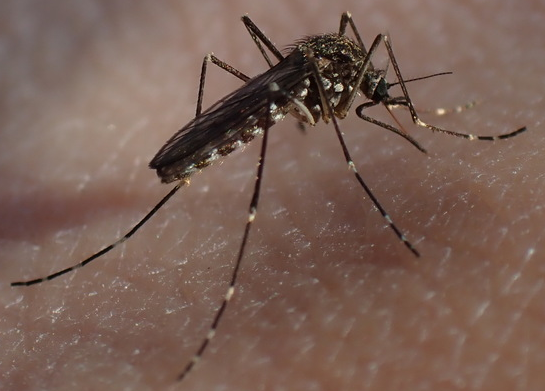

Scientific classification
- Kingdom: Animalia
- Phylum: Arthropoda
- Clade: Pancrustacea
- Class: Insecta
- Order: Diptera
- Family: Culicidae
- Genus: Aedes
- Subgenus: Tanakaius
- Species: A. togoi

Binomial name
- Aedes togoi (Theobald, 1907)

Synonyms
- Culex togoi Theobald, 1907

= Aedes togoi =

Species of mosquito

Aedes togoi is a species of mosquito in the genus Aedes, primarily found in coastal regions of East Asia and parts of North America. It is known for breeding in brackish and salt water environments, such as rock pools and tidal areas, and serves as a vector for diseases including Japanese encephalitis.

== Distribution ==
Aedes togoi is native to the Palaearctic and Oriental Regions, with established populations in Japan, Malaysia, Cambodia, China, Russia, South Korea, Taiwan, Thailand, and Vietnam. It has also become invasive in the northwestern United States and British Columbia, Canada, likely introduced via the used tire trade in the 1960s. Its distribution is closely linked to coastal habitats, though it can adapt to inland freshwater environments.

== Description ==
Adult Aedes togoi mosquitoes are distinguished from other members of the Aedes genus in that they lack the narrow yellowish stripe of scales on their legs, and they bear a lower mesepimeral seta.

== Life cycle ==
The life cycle of Aedes togoi consists of four stages: egg, larva, pupa, and adult, following the standard mosquito pattern. Females deposit eggs in brackish or salt water habitats, such as tidal pools and rock pools, where larvae develop. In colder climates, larvae can overwinter, while in tropical regions, they remain active year-round.

== Disease transmission ==
Aedes togoi is a vector for several pathogens, including:

- Brugia malayi.
- Japanese encephalitis virus.
