= Parafilaria multipapillosa =

Scientific classification
- Kingdom: Animalia
- Phylum: Nematoda
- Class: Chromadorea
- Order: Rhabditida
- Family: Filariidae
- Genus: Parafilaria
- Species: P. multipapillosa

Binomial name
- Parafilaria multipapillosa (Condamine & Drouilly, 1878)

Species of roundworm

Parafilaria multipapillosa (syn. Filaria haemorrhagica) is a parasitic nematode of the genus Parafilaria, which affects horses causing hemorrhagic subcutaneous nodules in the head and upper forelimbs, in North Africa, Southern and Eastern Europe, Asia and South America, leading to bleeding from the skin. It is commonly referred to as "summer bleeding".

== Description ==
Parafilaria multipapillosa is related to Parafilaria antipini which are found in deer, and Parafilaria bovicola which causes hemorrhagic nodules in the skin of cattle and buffalo.

The nematode is thought to be passed by blood-sucking Haematobia spp [biting flies] in spring and summer. It causes skin nodules, particularly on the head and upper forequarters, which often bleed profusely ("summer bleeding") but then usually resolve, though occasionally suppurating. The nodules and bleeding, though annoying and unsightly are generally of little consequence. The clinical signs are pathognomonic. No effective treatment is available.

'“Modern researchers, [Professor Victor] Mair notes, have come up with two different ideas [for the ancient Chinese references to the “Blood-sweating” horses of Ferghana]. The first suggests that small subcutaneous blood vessels burst as the horses sustained a long hard gallop. The second theorizes that a parasitic nematode, Parafilaria multipapillosa, triggered the phenomenon. P. multipapillosa is widely distributed across the Russian steppes and makes its living by burrowing into the subcutaneous tissues of horses. The resulting skin nodules bleed often, sometimes copiously, giving rise to a something veterinarians call “summer bleeding.”

== Ancient history ==
Over 2,100 years ago two Chinese armies traveled 10,000 km to find "Heavenly Horses" or Ferghana horses, apparently infected with a tiny worm causing them to "sweat blood" from skin sores:

"Sometime earlier the emperor [ Wudi ] had divined by the Book of Changes and been told that "divine horses are due to appear" from the northwest". When the Wusun came with their horses, which were of an excellent breed, he named them "heavenly horses". Later, however, he obtained the blood-sweating horses from Dayuan [= Ferghana], which were even hardier. He therefore changed the name of the Wusun horses, calling them "horses from the western extremity", and used the name "heavenly horses" for the horses of Dayuan."

Parafilaria multipapillosa is thought to have been the cause of the "blood-sweating" of these famous and much desired horses from Ferghana, which Emperor Wu of Han China (Wudi) renamed "Heavenly Horses" (c. 113 BCE). In response, the Emperor sent out Li Guangli, the brother of his favorite concubine, he was given 6,000 horsemen and 20,000 infantry soldiers.[1] Li's army had to cross the Taklamakan Desert and his supplies soon ran out. After a gruesome march of over 1,000 miles he finally arrived to the country of Dayuan, but what remained of his army was exhausted and starving.[1] Li lost many men along the way in petty fights with local rulers. After a severe defeat at a place called Yucheng, Li concluded that he was not strong enough to take the enemy capital and therefore returned to Dunhuang about 102 BC.

Emperor Wudi responded by giving Li Guangli a much larger army along with a huge number of oxen, donkeys and camels to carry supplies. With this force he had no difficulty reaching Khujand (called Ershi by the Chinese), the Dayuan capital. He lost half his army during the march,[1] but after a 40-day siege the Chinese had broken through the outer wall and cut off the water supply. The nobles of Ershi killed their king and sent his head to Li Guangli, offering the Chinese all the horses they wanted. Li accepted the offer, appointed one of the nobles to be the new king and withdrew with a tribute of 3,000 horses.[1] On his return journey all the petty states accepted Chinese sovereignty. He reached the Jade Gate about 100 BC with 10,000 men and 1,000 horses.
