= Setaria cervi =

Scientific classification
- Kingdom: Animalia
- Phylum: Nematoda
- Class: Chromadorea
- Order: Rhabditida
- Family: Setariidae
- Genus: Setaria
- Species: S. cervi

Binomial name
- Setaria cervi (Rudolphi, 1819)

Species of roundworm

Setaria cervi is a species of parasitic roundworms belonging to the genus Setaria. It infects cattle, bison, yak, reindeer, buffalo, moose, and sheep all over the world. It is most prevalent in Europe and Asia. Different species of Aedes mosquito can transmit the filarial worm. Stable fly Haematobia stimulans is the major vector. The mature roundworms are primarily present in the abdominal (peritoneal) cavity, but are capable of migrating to central nervous system causing serious neurological disease.

== Description ==
Setaria cervi shows sexual dimorphism as a typical roundworm. Males are relatively smaller measuring 50 mm long and 40 μm wide, while females are much larger measuring 100 mm long and 750 μm wide. Males can be distinguished from those of other species from showing horn-like lateral appendages and characteristic striated bands on the ventral side of the tail. The larvae (microfilariae) are very small and only about 200 μm long. The infective larvae are about 2 mm.

== Life cycle ==
Setaria cervi is transmitted between mammals as definitive hosts and insects as intermediate hosts. Microfilariae are ingested by insect vector when they bite infected host. Once inside the gut of the insect, the larvae shed off their protective covering, a process called exsheathing. This generally take place within 90 minutes of initial ingestion. They penetrate the stomach wall and migrate to the body cavity, haemocoel. After 48 hours they move to fat bodies, where they undergo development by moulting. Second moulting follows after 11 days of infection. Soon after, the juveniles move back to haemocoel to become fully infective larvae. Then they move towards the proboscis from where they are readily released. Infective larvae are characterised by numerous projections called tubercles on the tail end.

The infective larvae are injected into the mammalian host, where they undergo third moulting. By this the size of the body is greatly enlarged. Full maturation into reproductive adults require about a year. The average lifespan of an adult is 1.5 years.

== Pathogenicity ==
Setaria cervi in the body cavity is generally harmless. But the young larvae upon infection can move to the nervous system, where they induce severe neurological disease, as well as in the eye, where they can cause eye damage resulting in blindness.

== Treatment ==
Albendazole is very effective on the microfilariae. Hetrazan, tetramisole and levamisole are most commonly used.
