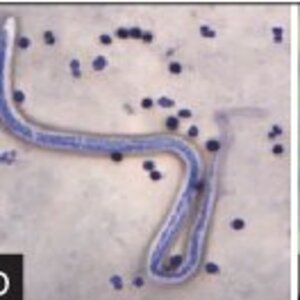

Scientific classification
- Kingdom: Animalia
- Phylum: Nematoda
- Class: Chromadorea
- Order: Rhabditida
- Family: Onchocercidae
- Genus: Brugia
- Species: B. timori

Binomial name
- Brugia timori Partono et al. 1977

= Brugia timori =

Species of filarial nematode

Brugia timori is a filarial (arthropod-borne) nematode (roundworm) which causes the disease "Timor filariasis", or "Timorian filariasis". While this disease was first described in 1965, the identity of Brugia timori as the causative agent was not known until 1977. In that same year, Anopheles barbirostris was shown to be its primary vector. There is no known animal reservoir host.

== Signs and symptoms ==
Brugia timori
- Specialty: Infectious disease

Like other human filariasis infections, Brugia timori filariasis causes acute fever and chronic lymphedema. The life cycle of Brugia timori is very similar to that of Wuchereria bancrofti and Brugia malayi, leading to nocturnal periodicity of the disease symptoms. Eosinophilia is common during acute stages of infection.

So far Brugia timori has only been found in the Lesser Sunda Islands of Indonesia. It is locally confined to areas inhabited by its mosquito vector, which breeds in rice fields. One study of the prevalence of infection in Mainang village, Alor Island, found microfilariae in the blood of 157 of 586 individuals (27%), with 77 of them (13%) exhibiting lymphedema of the leg.

== Parasite ==
The microfilariae of Brugia timori are longer and morphologically distinct from those of Brugia malayi and Wuchereria bancrofti, with a cephalic space length-to-width ratio of about 3:1. B. timori more closely resembles the symptoms caused by B. malayi and morphologically resembles B. malayi. The sheath of B. timori does not stain pink with Giemsa stain as is observed with B. malayi, however.

=== Life cycle ===
The life cycle is:

1. During feeding, mosquitos ingest the infective filariform from an infected host
2. Inside the mosquito the microfilariae penetrate the midgut and migrate to muscle tissue to grow and undergo two molts into infective filariform larvae (no sexual reproduction occurs within the mosquito)
3. The filariform larvae will migrate to the mouthparts of the mosquito
4. Larvae enter the host's circulation and migrate to lymphatic vessels where they develop into microfilariae-producing adults. Here the adults can live for several years
5. The infective filariform enter the circulation of the host to repeat the life cycle

=== Morphology ===
B. timori microfilariae have nuclei that extend to the tip of the tail, which is also characteristic of B. malayi but not W. bancrofti. B. timori microfilariae are slightly larger than B. malayi microfilariae.

=== Endosymbiont ===
Aside from vectoring Brugia species, mosquitoes also maintain Wolbachia spp. which have been found to be obligate intracellular bacterial endosymbionts of Brugia spp. Wolbachia supports essential biochemical pathways necessary for the survival of Brugia, especially processes such as embryogenesis and molting.

== Treatment ==
Anthelmintics such as diethylcarbamazine and albendazole have shown promise in the treatment of Brugia timori filariasis. Some researchers are confident that Brugia timori filariasis may be an eradicable disease. Related filarial nematodes have been found highly sensitive to elimination of their endosymbiotic Wolbachia bacteria, and this may be a powerful attack route against Brugia timori as well.

== See also ==
- List of parasites (human)
