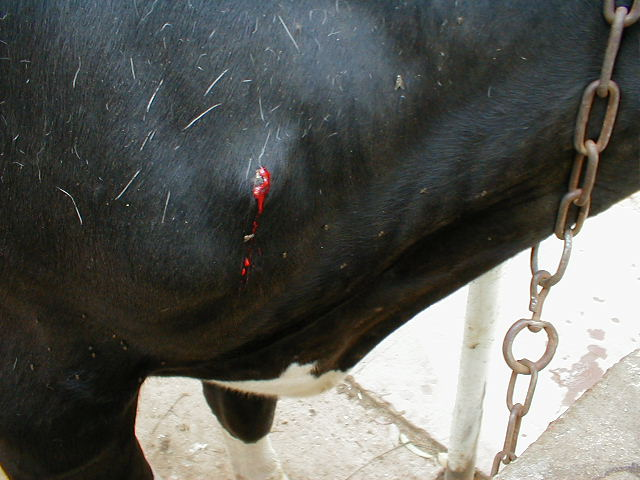

Scientific classification
- Kingdom: Animalia
- Phylum: Nematoda
- Class: Chromadorea
- Order: Rhabditida
- Family: Filariidae
- Genus: Parafilaria; Yorke & Maplestone, 1926

= Parafilaria =

Genus of roundworms

Parafilaria is a genus of nematodes belonging to the family Filariidae.

The species of this genus are found in Northern America.

Species:

- Parafilaria antipinni Rukhliadev, 1947
- Parafilaria bovicola Tubangui, 1934
- Parafilaria multipapillosa (Condamine & Drouilly, 1878)
