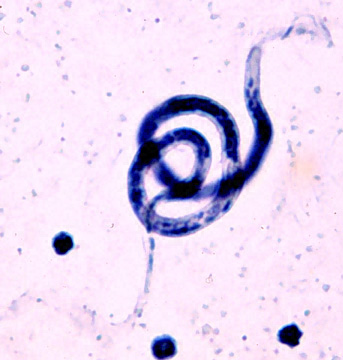
- B. malayi from blood smear using Giemsa stain.

Scientific classification
- Kingdom: Animalia
- Phylum: Nematoda
- Class: Chromadorea
- Order: Rhabditida
- Family: Onchocercidae
- Genus: Brugia; Buckley, 1960

Species
- Brugia malayi Brugia timori Brugia pahangi Brugia patei Brugia buckleyi

= Brugia =

Genus of roundworms

Brugia is a genus for a group of small roundworms. They are among roundworms that cause the parasitic disease filariasis. Specifically, of the five species known, Brugia malayi and Brugia timori cause lymphatic filariasis in humans; and Brugia pahangi and Brugia patei infect domestic cats, dogs and other animals. Brugia buckleyi specifically infects the Indian hare (Lepus nigricollis singhala). They are transmitted by the bite of mosquitos.

== Discovery ==
The first species discovered was B. malayi. It was reported by a Dutch parasitologist Steffen Lambert Brug in 1927 from Southeast Asia (Malaya, for which the name was given). It was originally believed to be similar or closely related to another filarial roundworm then named Microfilaria bancrofti (now Wuchereria bancrofti), described by an English naturalist Thomas Spencer Cobbold in 1877. It was for this reason that Brug gave the original name Microfilaria (Filaria) malayi. Brug was aware of the difference mainly on the basis of their occurrence. He found both the worms in Sumatra, Java, Borneo, and Celebes; but in New Guinea only W. bancrofti was present, but not the new species. They are so similar that even after a decade of research, there were still arguments of B. malayi as a separate and valid species. As such S. Sundar Rao and P.A. Maplestone assigned the name Wuchereria malayi in 1940. The scientific name was retained for two decades.

When a new species (now called Brugia pahangi) was discovered in 1956 from dog and cat, J. J. C. Buckley and J. F. B. Edeson named it Wuchereria pahangi after the village Pahang in Malay, where it was discovered. Another species Wuchereria patei was described by Buckley, with G. S. Nelson and R. B. Heisch, in 1958. It was discovered from cats and dogs in Pate Island, Kenya. Buckley reexamined all the Wuchereria species in 1960, and concluded that the genus should contain only W. bancrofti. He created a new genus Brugia in honour of the original discoverer, thus renaming B. malayi, B. pahangi, and B. patei. In 1977, a new species B. timori was reported from Flores Island in Indonesia.

== Description ==
Brugia roundworms are small, measuring less than a centimetre. The longest female is 60 mm long and 0.19 mm wide, and male is 25 mm long and 0.1 mm wide. Like other roundworms, the females are larger and longer than the males. The young ones called microfilariae are less than half a millimetre. They are enclosed in a sheath (egg shell) which are easily stained with Giemsa stain (but not for B. timori). The sheath protects them while moving in the blood stream. Species of Brugia are morphologically similar to W. bancrofti and Loa loa. But they can be differentiated from their smaller microfilariae, complex spicules, and fewer caudal papillae (typically 11, while it is 24 in W. bancrofti).

== Life cycle ==
Brugia roundworms complete their life cycle in two different hosts. Mosquitos are the intermediate host in which the young larvae develop, and thus they are also the vectors of filariasis. Different species of Mansonia and Aedes act as the intermediate hosts. Humans (for B. malayi and B. timori), and animals (for B. pahangi and B. patei) acts as the definitive hosts in which the adult worms cause filariasis. The infective larvae called L3 (third stage) larvae are transmitted by an infected mosquito onto the skin of the definitive host. Once reaching the blood stream, they grow into adult roundworms. Male and female worms reproduce to release the young worms called microfilariae. These microfilariae move to peripheral blood stream from where they are picked up by another mosquito. Inside the mosquito, they became larvae, first L1 and then L3. The L3 larvae are stored in the proboscis from where they are ejected into the host during biting.
