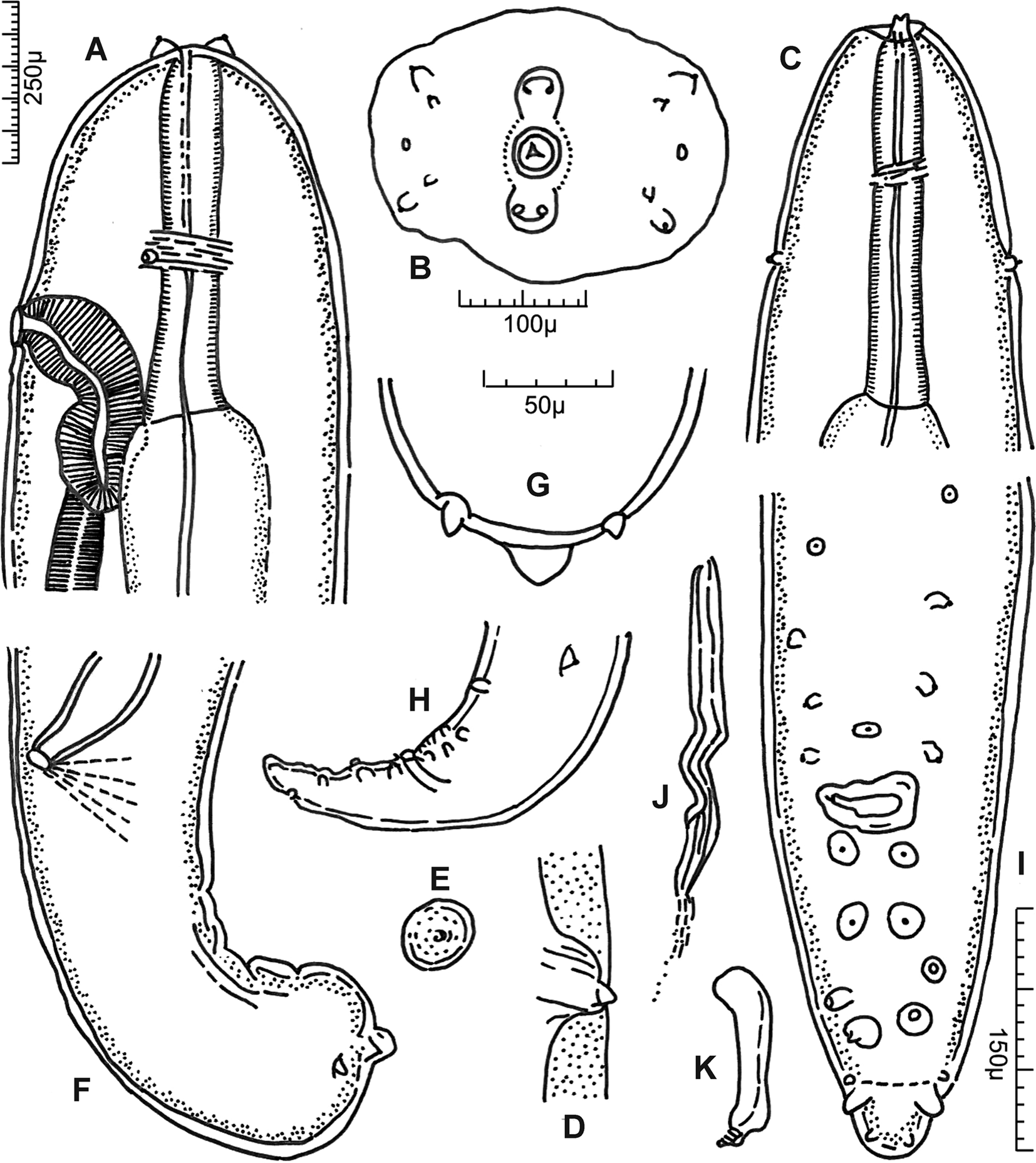
- Setaria graberi, an antelope parasite

Scientific classification
- Kingdom: Animalia
- Phylum: Nematoda
- Class: Chromadorea
- Order: Rhabditida
- Family: Setariidae
- Genus: Setaria; Viborg, 1795

= Setaria (nematode) =

Genus of roundworms

Setaria is a genus of parasitic roundworms that infect domesticated mammals such as pigs, camels, cattle and horses. Some species also infect wild mammals such as deer and antelope. The genus consists of about 43 species. Members of the genus are uniquely parasites in the abdominal cavity of the body. They are mostly large-sized roundworms, possessing an elaborate head (cephalic) region that is characterised by spines, presence of four lips, and well-guarded mouth. Little is known about their pathogenic effects, but some are known to affect the nervous system and eye. The larval infective forms are transmitted from one animal to another by the bite of mosquitoes and flies. In addition Setaria marshalli can be transmitted from the womb to new-born calf.

A rare case of human infection was recorded in 2016 from a 15-year-old Iranian girl, who was diagnosed with Setaria equina in her eye.

== Species ==
Some important species of the genus are:

- Setaria cervi which are parasites of buffalo, bison, deer and antelope. They are capable of migrating to central nervous system causing serious neurological disease. They are found worldwide and predominantly in Europe and Asia. Stable fly Haematobia stimulans is the major vector.
- Setaria digitata which are parasites of cattle in Asia. It was introduced to Mauritius. Different species of mosquitoes including those of Aedes, Culex and Anopheles are vectors. In central Japan Anopheles sinensis is the major vector.
- Setaria equina which are parasites of horses, mules, and donkeys, and also capable of infecting cattle and camels. Mosquito species of Aedes are the primary vectors. They are most prevalent in Kenya.
- Setaria javensis which are parasites of mouse-deer in Malaysia. They are transmitted by Aedes togoi.
- Setaria labiatopapillosa which are parasites of cattle, as well as other domesticated animals. Aedes togoi and Anopheles hyrcanus are the vectors in Japan, while Mansonia spp. are vectors in Kenya, and Aedes caspius in Italy.
- Setaria marshalli which are parasites of cattle.
