= Ferghana horse =

Breed of horse

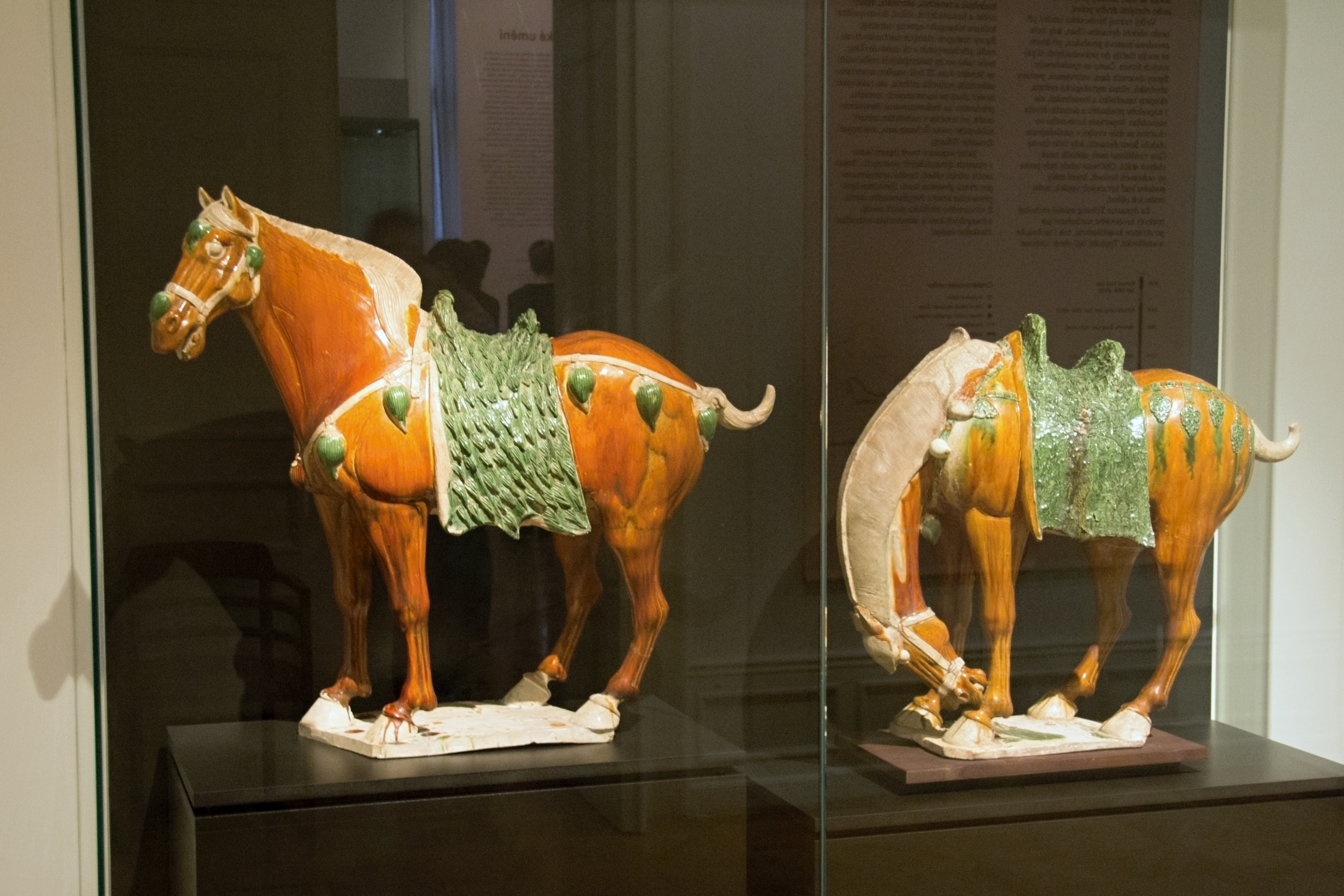
Two sancai-glazed Tang dynasty tomb figures, early 8th century, Prague National Gallery

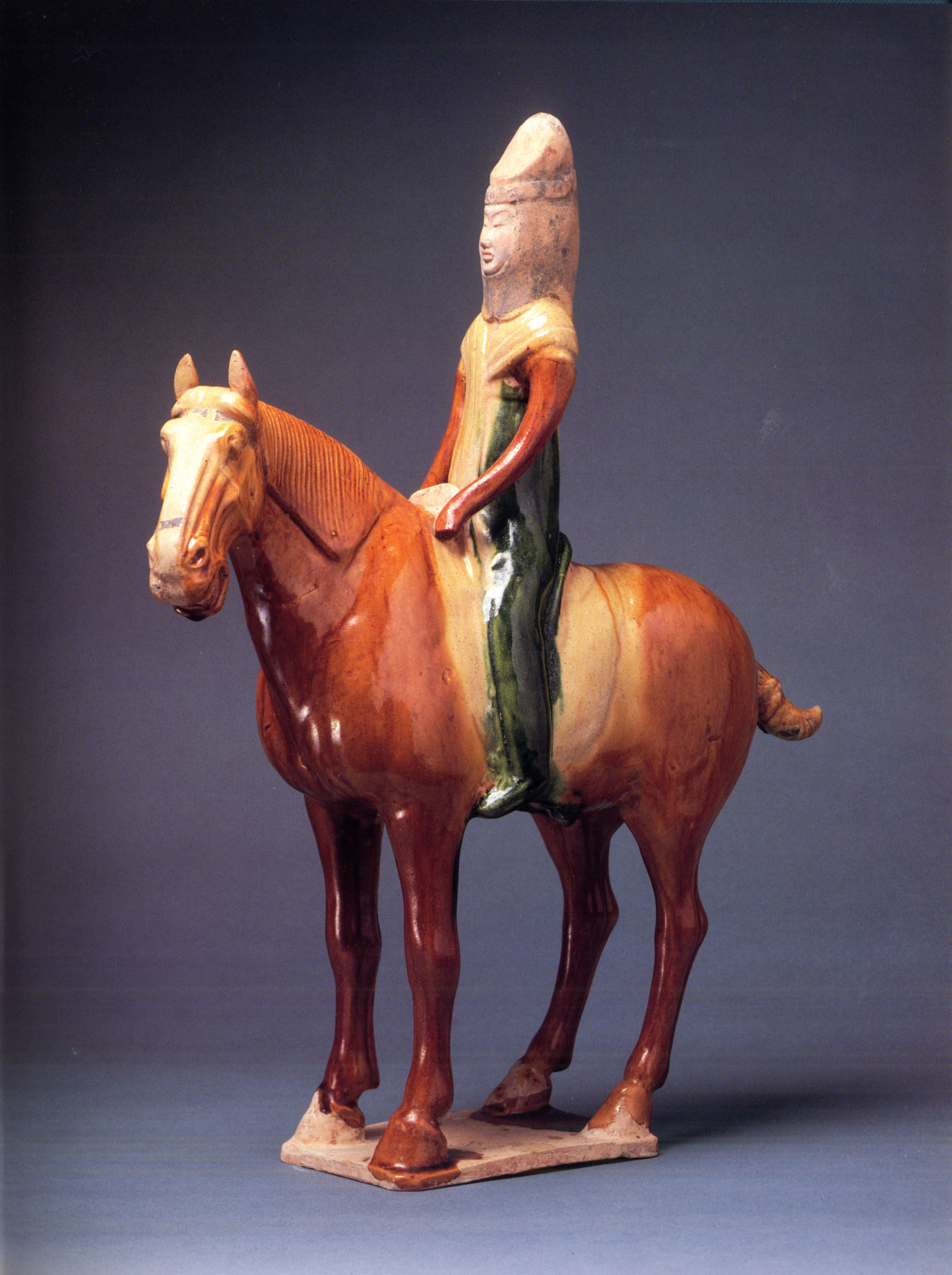
Female horse rider, Tang dynasty

Ferghana horses (Chinese: 大宛馬 / 宛馬; pinyin: dàyuānmǎ / yuānmǎ; Wade–Giles: ta-yüan-ma / yüan-ma) were one of China's earliest major imports, originating from the Fergana Valley in Central Asia. These horses, as depicted in Tang dynasty tomb figures in earthenware, may "resemble the animals on the golden medal of Eucratides, King of Bactria (Bibliothèque Nationale in Paris)."

The Ferghana horse is also known as the "heavenly horse" in China or the Nisean horse in the West.

== Ancient history ==
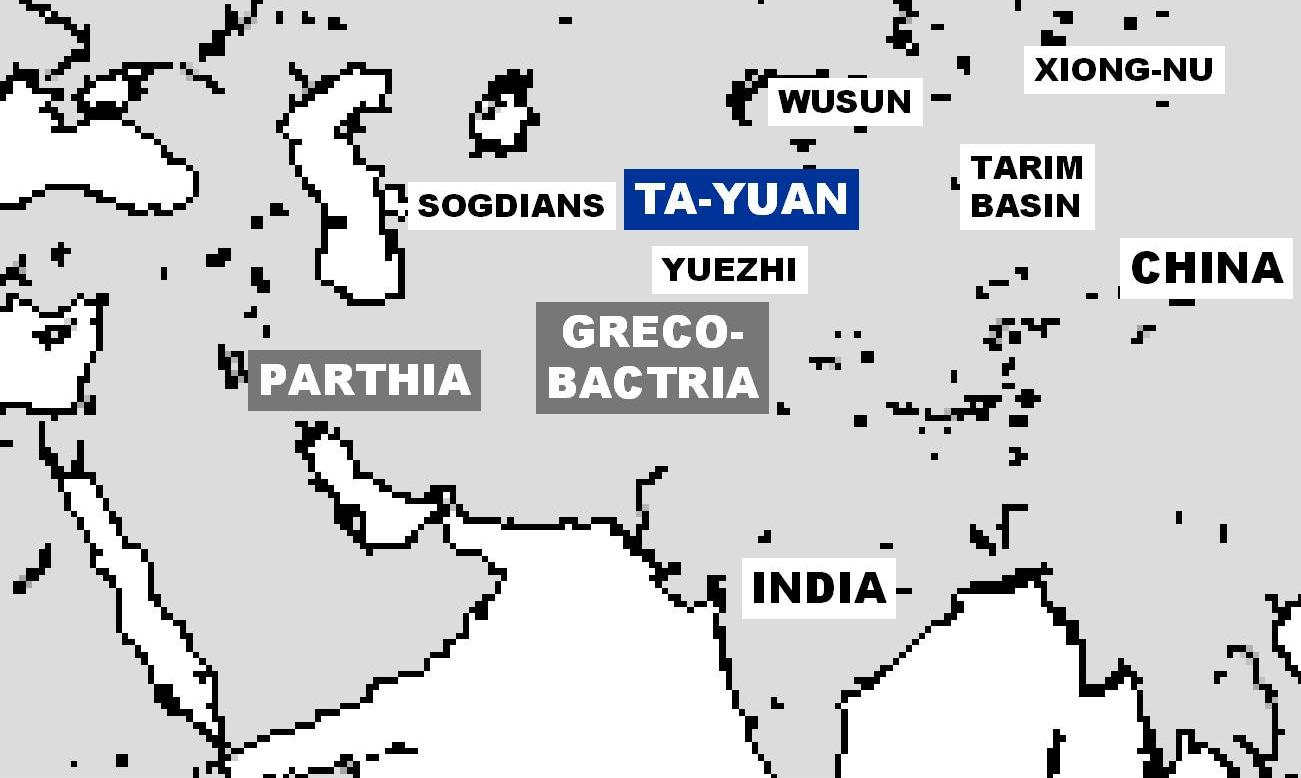
Map showing Dayuan at 130 BCE

The Han dynasty Emperor Wudi sent a huge military expedition to Ferghana in 104 B.C. to acquire a sufficient number of "Heavenly Horses". The Han suffered a military defeat and went home empty handed.

In 102 B.C., the Chinese gathered a massive army of over 60,000 men and 30,000 horses, for a campaign to acquire "Heavenly Horses". This army crushed several villages that showed resistance, but not without suffering 50% losses. The town of Ferghana was placed under siege, and its inhabitants threatened to slaughter all of the horses, but a compromise was eventually reached, and the Chinese army would be given the best pick of the horses and food available. Roughly 30 "Heavenly Horses" were acquired, along with 3,000 horses of middling or lower quality. Sinologist Arthur Waley in his article The Heavenly Horses of Ferghana made the important distinction between the two types of horses that Emperor Wu of Han had sought: the few divine ones to satisfy his spiritual needs; and the many sturdier mounts required to continuously replenish and build up his cavalry.

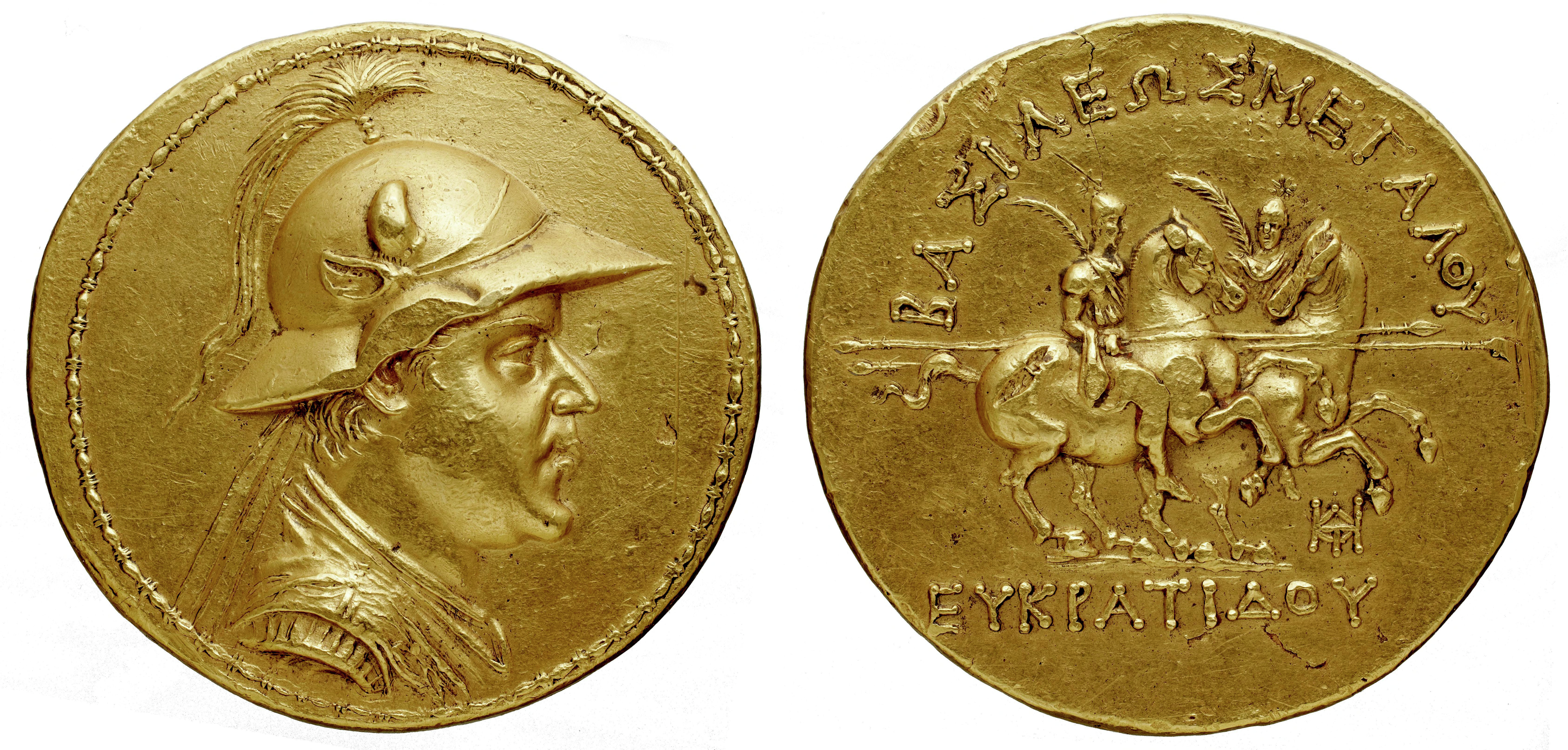
Coin showing Eucratides I of Bactria and the Dioscuri

Chinese statuary and paintings, as well as the Bactrian coin, indicate that these horses may have had legs that were proportionally short, powerful crests, and round barrels. The forelegs of the Chinese depictions are very straight, resembling the Guoxia horse of present-day China. According to tradition, these horses sweated blood, giving rise to the name "sweats blood horse" (in Chinese: 汗血馬; pinyin: hànxuèmǎ). Modern authorities believe that blood-sucking parasites caused sweat to mix with blood when the horses were worked.

Modern researchers, Mair notes, have come up with two different ideas [for the ancient Chinese references to the "Blood-sweating" horses of Ferghana]. The first suggests that small subcutaneous blood vessels burst as the horses sustained a long hard gallop. The second theorizes that a parasitic nematode, Parafilaria multipapillosa, triggered the phenomenon. P. multipapillosa is widely distributed across the Russian steppes and makes its living by burrowing into the subcutaneous tissues of horses. The resulting skin nodules bleed often, sometimes copiously, giving rise to a something veterinarians call "summer bleeding."

Emperor Wu of Han China (Wudi) named the horses "Heavenly Horses" (c. 113 BCE) after a divination predicted their appearance.

Sometime earlier the emperor had divined by the Book of Changes and been told that "divine horses are due to appear" from the northwest. When the Wusun came with their horses, which were of an excellent breed, he named them "heavenly horses". Later, however, he obtained the blood-sweating horses from Dayuan [= Ferghana], which were even hardier. He therefore changed the name of the Wusun horses, calling them "horses from the western extremity", and used the name "heavenly horses" for the horses of Dayuan.

After installing a new puppet King, the Han left with 3,000 horses, although only 1,000 remained by the time they reached China in 101 BCE. The Ferghana also agreed to send two Heavenly horses each year to the Emperor, and lucerne seed was brought back to China providing superior pasture for raising fine horses in China, to provide cavalry which could cope with the Xiongnu who threatened China.

== Symbolism and Artistic Depictions ==
The Ferghana horse – often referred to as a "Heavenly Horse" – holds a prominent place in the art and mythology of Central Asia and Han dynasty China. Across these cultures, the animal was depicted with an aura of divine association, emphasizing its perceived ability to bridge the human and celestial realms. Artistic representations and legends surrounding the Ferghana horse underscored its cross-cultural significance as a creature of exceptional speed, strength, and heavenly favor.

One of the most notable artistic artifacts is a gilded bronze horse finial attributed to the Greco-Bactrian Kingdom (circa 3rd–2nd century BCE). This finely crafted finial – possibly an ornament atop a royal standard or chariot – portrays a galloping horse in mid-stride with remarkable anatomical realism. Modern 3D scanning and biomechanical analysis have confirmed that the ancient sculptor captured the animal in a full-stride “V-gallop” phase of motion, characterized by an S-shaped curvature of the spine and well-defined musculature in the legs and torso. Such fidelity to a dynamic gait (a posture only fully understood in modern times through photography) suggests that Hellenistic-era artisans had a sophisticated practical knowledge of horse locomotion. The Greco-Bactrian Heavenly Horse finial thus stands as evidence of both artistic skill and keen observation of nature in antiquity.

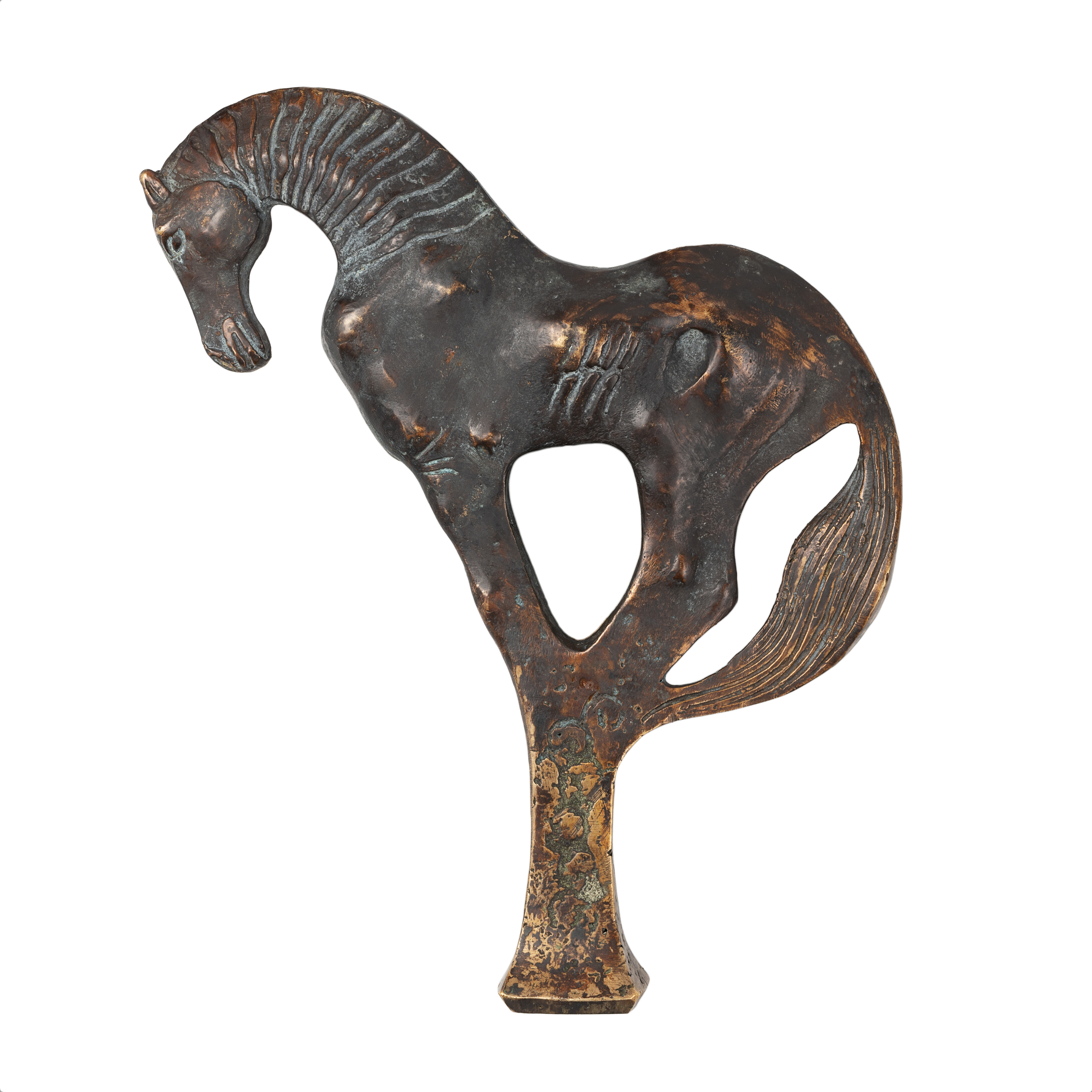
The Ceremonial Gilt Bronze Finial, Ferghana Horse, Dates Back to the 4th-1st Century BCE

In Han dynasty China (206 BCE – 220 CE), Ferghana horses imported from Central Asia became deeply embedded in imperial symbolism and myth under the name "Heavenly Horses" (天馬, tianma). According to Han-era legends, these supernatural horses were believed capable of traversing vast distances and even reaching the paradise of Mount Kunlun, the mythic abode of the Queen Mother of the West, to obtain the peaches of immortality for the emperor. The Han Emperor Wu of Han notably dispatched expeditions to acquire Ferghana horses, and their arrival was celebrated as a sign of Heaven’s favor. Possessing these illustrious steeds became intertwined with imperial ideology: the horses were seen as living symbols of the dynasty’s heavenly mandate, representing a conduit between the emperor’s court and the divine realm. In art and literature of the period, Heavenly Horses were often portrayed with auspicious motifs to reinforce their otherworldly status and the promise of longevity and power they conferred upon their owners.

Beyond their immediate cultural contexts, the image of the Heavenly Horse came to embody broader Eurasian cosmological themes. Scholars interpret the Ferghana horse as a mythic mediator between heaven and earth, drawing parallels to the concept of the axis mundi (world axis) in Eurasian traditions. Artistic depictions from the Silk Road often combine the horse with grapevine scroll motifs – a design element adopted from Hellenistic art – which in this context symbolizes vitality, abundance, and immortality. The fusion of the grapevine (a symbol of life and renewal) with the celestial horse reflects a synthesis of Greco-Bactrian and Inner Asian symbolic vocabularies. In this blended iconography, the Ferghana Heavenly Horse is presented as a creature traversing both earthly and celestial realms, effectively embodying prosperity, cosmic connectivity, and the idea of a link between the mundane world and the divine.

== Medieval China ==
Ferghana were popular in China for roughly the next 1,000 years until the demand shifted to larger, stronger local breeds. Nomadic breeds like Ferghana horses were fast, tough and had high endurance, but they were smaller and leaner than local breeds. The Ferghana horse is considered to be equivalent to the Nisean horse or Turkoman horse, which are both now extinct. The Akhal-Teke horse is believed to descend from the original Ferghana horse.

== See also ==
- Horses in East Asian warfare
- Hematidrosis
- Nisean horse
- Turkoman horse
