= Loa (nematode) =

Scientific classification
- Kingdom: Animalia
- Phylum: Nematoda
- Class: Chromadorea
- Order: Rhabditida
- Family: Onchocercidae
- Genus: Loa; Stiles, 1905

Genus of roundworms

Loa is a genus of nematodes belonging to the family Filariidae.

Species:

- Loa extraocularis Skrjabin, 1917
- Loa inquirenda Maplestone, 1938
- Loa loa (Cobbold, 1864)
- Loa papionis Treadgold, 1920
