= Aproctidae =

Scientific classification
- Domain: Eukaryota
- Kingdom: Animalia
- Phylum: Nematoda
- Class: Chromadorea
- Order: Rhabditida
- Family: Aproctidae

Family of spirurian roundworms

Aproctidae is a family of nematodes belonging to superfamily Filarioidea in order Rhabditida.

Genera:

- Aprocta Linstow, 1883
- Hovorkonema Jurasek, 1977
- Lissonema Linstow, 1903
- Mawsonfilaria Anderson & Chabaud, 1958
- Pseudaprocta Schikhobalova, 1930
- Squamofilaria Schmerling, 1925
- Tetracheilonema Diesing, 1861
