= Lisa Mazzotti =

Italian voice actress

- Other name: Elisabetta Mazzotti
- Occupation: Voice actress

Maria Elisabetta "Lisa" Mazzotti (born 16 July 1949) is an Italian voice actress who is affiliated with Associazione Doppiatori Attori Pubblicitari.

She is known for being the Italian dubbing voice actress to Naru Osaka (known as "Nina in the Italian dub) in the Sailor Moon anime franchise.

== Dubbing roles ==
OVA anime

- Iczelion - Black Iczel

Anime television

- Sailor Moon - Naru Osaka (Nina)
- Tonde Buurin - Keiko Kuroha (Heather Hogwarsh)
- Transformers: The Headmasters - Phantom
- X - Tokiko Magami

Television animation

- Rupert - Rupert

Live action television

- Goosebumps - Skipper Matthews (Dan Warry-Smith) (episode: "Attack of the Mutant Parts I & II")

Animated films

- Balto II: Wolf Quest - Jenna
- Balto III: Wings of Change - Jenna
- The Ugly Duckling - Lady Mouse
