= Mesidionematidae =

Scientific classification
- Domain: Eukaryota
- Kingdom: Animalia
- Phylum: Nematoda
- Class: Chromadorea
- Order: Rhabditida
- Suborder: Spirurida
- Family: Mesidionematidae

Family of roundworms

Mesidionematidae is a family of nematodes belonging to the order Spirurida. They are parasitic and reside in the coelomic cavity and intestinal lumen of acanthodrilid and megascolecid annelids.

Genera:

- Mesidionema Poinar, 1978
