= Loa loa filariasis =

- Other names: loiasis, loaiasis, Calabar swellings, fugitive swelling, tropical swelling, African eyeworm
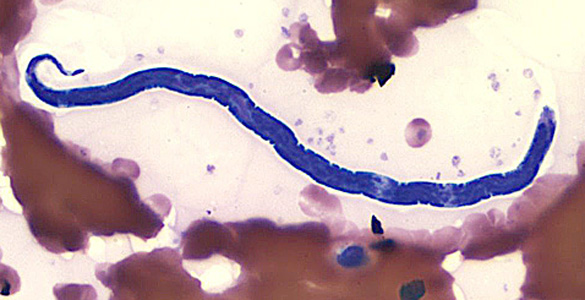
- Loa loa microfilaria in thin blood smear (Giemsa stain)
- Specialty: Infectious diseases, tropical medicine

Loa loa filariasis or loiasis is a skin and eye disease caused by the nematode worm Loa loa. Humans contract this disease through the bite of a deer fly or mango fly (Chrysops spp.), the vectors for Loa loa. The adult Loa loa filarial worm can reach from three to seven centimetres long and migrates throughout the subcutaneous tissues of humans, occasionally crossing into subconjunctival tissues of the eye where it can be easily observed. Loa loa does not normally affect vision but can be painful when moving about the eyeball or across the bridge of the nose. Loiasis can cause red itchy swellings below the skin called "Calabar swellings". The disease is treated with the drug diethylcarbamazine (DEC), and when appropriate, surgical methods may be employed to remove adult worms from the conjunctiva. Loiasis belongs to the group of neglected tropical diseases, and there is a call for it to be included in the high-priority listing.

== Signs and symptoms ==
A filariasis such as loiasis most often consists of asymptomatic microfilaremia in peripheral blood. Some patients can develop lymphatic dysfunction causing lymphedema. Episodic angioedema (Calabar swellings) in the arms and legs, caused by immune reactions, are common. Calabar swellings are 3–10 cm (1.2–3.9 in) in surface area, sometimes erythematous, and not pitting. When chronic, they can form cyst-like enlargements of the connective tissue around the sheaths of muscle tendons, becoming very painful when moved. The swellings may last for one to three days and may be accompanied by localized urticaria (skin eruptions) and pruritus (itching). They reappear at referent locations at irregular time intervals. Subconjunctival migration of an adult worm to the eyes can also occur frequently, and this is the reason Loa loa is also called the "African eye worm". The passage over the eyeball can be sensed, but it rarely causes permanent eye damage. Eyeworms affect men and women equally, but advanced age is a risk factor. Eosinophilia is often prominent in filarial infections. Dead worms may cause chronic abscesses, which may lead to the formation of granulomatous reactions and fibrosis.

Loiasis is often thought to be a mild disease. It can sometimes cause unusual problems in the kidneys, heart, brain and nerves, lungs, eyes, and skin.

In the human host, Loa loa larvae migrate to the subcutaneous tissue, where they mature into adult worms in approximately one year, but sometimes up to four years. Adult worms migrate in the subcutaneous tissues at a speed of less than 1 cm/min, mating and producing more microfilariae. The adult worms can live up to 17 years in the human host.

== Cause ==
=== Transmission ===
Loa loa infective larvae (L3) are transmitted to humans by the deer fly vectors of the tabanid genus Chrysops—C. dimidiata and C. silacea. These carriers are blood-sucking and day-biting, and they are found in rainforest-like environments in western and central Africa. Infective larvae (L3) mature to adults (L5) in the subcutaneous tissues of the human host, after which the adult worms—assuming the presence of a male and female worm—mate and produce microfilariae. The cycle of infection continues when a non-infected mango or deer fly takes a blood meal from a microfilaremic human host, and this stage of the transmission is possible because of the combination of the diurnal periodicity of microfilariae and the day-biting tendencies of the Chrysops spp.

=== Reservoir ===
Humans are the primary reservoir for Loa loa. Other minor potential reservoirs have been indicated in various fly-biting habit studies, such as hippopotamuses, wild ruminants (e.g. buffalo), rodents, and lizards. A simian type of loiasis exists in monkeys and apes which is transmitted by the deer fly vector Chrysops langi. There is no crossover between the human and simian types of the disease.

=== Vector ===
Loa loa is transmitted by several species of tabanid flies. The two most prominent vectors are from the tabanid genus Chrysops—C. dimidiata and C. silacea. These species exist only in Africa and are popularly known as deer flies, mangrove flies or mango flies. Chrysops langi is also a competent vector species.

Chrysops spp. are small (5–20 mm, 0.20–0.79 in long) with a large head and downward-pointing mouthparts. Their wings are clear or speckled brown. They are hematophagous and typically live in forested and muddy habitats like swamps, streams, reservoirs, and rotting vegetation. Female mango and deer flies require a blood meal for the production of a second batch of eggs. This batch is deposited near water, where the eggs hatch in 5–7 days. The larvae mature in water or soil, where they feed on organic material such as decaying animal and vegetable products. Fly larvae are 1–6 cm (0.39–2.36 in) long and take 1–3 years to mature from egg to adult. When fully mature, C. dimidiata and C. silacea assume the day-biting tendencies of all tabanids.

The bite of the mango fly can be very painful, possibly because of the laceration style employed; rather than puncturing the skin as a mosquito does, the mango fly (and deer fly) makes a laceration in the skin and subsequently laps up the blood. Female flies require a fair amount of blood for their aforementioned reproductive purposes and thus may take multiple blood meals from the same host if disturbed during the first one.

Although Chrysops dimidiata and C. silacea are attracted to canopied rainforests, they do not do their bite there. Instead, they leave the forest and take most blood meals in open areas. The flies are attracted to smoke from wood fires and they use visual cues and sensation of carbon dioxide plumes to find their preferred host, humans.

A study of Chrysops spp. biting habits showed that C. dimidiata and C. silacea take human blood meals approximately 90% of the time, with hippopotamus, wild ruminant, rodent, and lizard blood meals making up the other 10%.

=== Morphology ===
Adult Loa worms are sexually dimorphic, with males considerably smaller than females at 30–34 mm long and 0.35–0.42 mm wide compared to 40–70 mm long and 0.5 mm wide. Adults live in the subcutaneous tissues of humans, where they mate and produce wormlike eggs called microfilariae. These microfilariae are 250–300 μm long, 6–8 μm wide, and can be distinguished morphologically from other filariae, as they are sheathed and contain body nuclei that extend to the tip of the tail.

=== Lifecycle ===
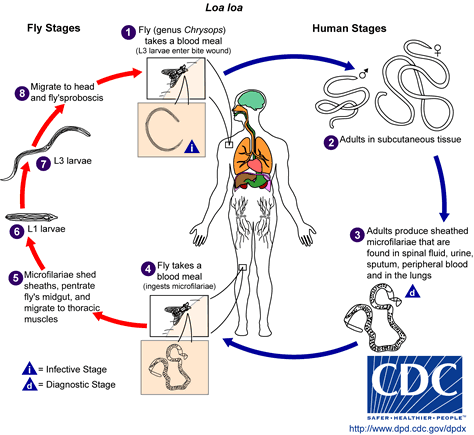
Loa loa life cycle. Source: CDC

During a blood meal, an infected Chrysops fly introduces third-stage filarial larvae onto the skin of the human host, where they penetrate the bite wound. The larvae develop into adults that commonly reside in subcutaneous tissue. The female worms measure 40 to 70 mm in length and 0.5 mm in diameter, while the males measure 30 to 34 mm in length and 0.35 to 0.43 mm in diameter. Adults produce microfilariae measuring 250 to 300 μm by 6 to 8 μm, which are sheathed and have diurnal periodicity. Microfilariae have been recovered from spinal fluids, urine and sputum. During the day, they are found in peripheral blood, but during the noncirculation phase, they are found in the lungs. The fly ingests microfilariae during a blood meal. After ingestion, the microfilariae lose their sheaths and migrate from the fly's midgut through the hemocoel to the thoracic muscles of the arthropod. There the microfilariae develop into first-stage larvae and subsequently into third-stage infective larvae. The third-stage infective larvae migrate to the fly's proboscis and can infect another human when the fly takes a blood meal.

== Diagnosis ==
Microscopic examination of microfilariae is a practical diagnostic procedure to find Loa loa. It is important to time the blood collection with the known periodicity of the microfilariae (between 10:00 a.m. and 2:00 p.m.). The blood sample can be a thick smear, stained with Giemsa or haematoxylin and eosin. For increased sensitivity, concentration techniques can be used. These include centrifugation of the blood sample lyzed in 2% formalin (Knott's technique), or filtration through a nucleopore membrane.

Antigen detection using an immunoassay for circulating filarial antigens constitutes a useful diagnostic approach because microfilaremia can be low and variable. Though the Institute for Tropical Medicine reports that no serologic diagnostics are available, tests that are highly specific to Loa loa have been developed in recent years. This is even though many recently developed methods of antibody detection are of limited value because substantial antigenic cross-reactivity exists between filaria and other parasitic worms (helminths), and a positive serologic test does not necessarily distinguish among infections. The new tests have not reached the point-of-care level yet, but show promise for highlighting high-risk areas and individuals with co-endemic loiasis and onchocerciasis. Specifically, Thomas Nutman and colleagues at the National Institutes of Health have described the a luciferase immunoprecipitation assay (LIPS) and the related QLIPS (quick version). Whereas a previously described LISXP-1 ELISA test had poor sensitivity (55%), the QLIPS test is practical, as it requires only a 15-minute incubation, while delivering high sensitivity (97%) and specificity (100%). No report on the distribution status of LIPS or QLIPS testing is available, but these tests would help to limit complications derived from mass ivermectin treatment for onchocerciasis or dangerous strong doses of diethylcarbamazine for loiasis alone (as pertains to individual with high Loa loa microfilarial loads).

Calabar swellings are the primary tool for visual diagnosis. Identification of adult worms is possible from tissue samples collected during subcutaneous biopsies. Adult worms migrating across the eye are another potential diagnostic, but the short timeframe for the worm's passage through the conjunctiva makes this observation less common.

In the past, healthcare providers used a provocative injection of Dirofilaria immitis as a skin-test antigen for filariasis diagnosis. If the patient was infected, the extract would cause an artificial allergic reaction and associated Calabar swelling similar to that caused, in theory, by metabolic products of the worm or dead worms.

Blood tests to reveal microfilaremia are useful in many, but not all cases, as one-third of loiasis patients are amicrofilaremic. By contrast, eosinophilia is almost guaranteed in cases of loiasis, and blood testing for eosinophil fraction may be useful.

== Prevention ==
Diethylcarbamazine has been shown as an effective prophylaxis for Loa loa infection. A study of Peace Corps volunteers in the highly Loa—endemic Gabon, for example, had the following results: 6 of 20 individuals in a placebo group contracted the disease, compared to 0 of 16 in the DEC-treated group. Seropositivity for antifilarial IgG antibody was also much higher in the placebo group. The recommended prophylactic dose is 300 mg DEC given orally once weekly. The only associated symptom in the Peace Corps study was nausea.

Researchers believe that geo-mapping of appropriate habitat and human settlement patterns may, with the use of predictor variables such as forest, land cover, rainfall, temperature, and soil type, allow for estimation of Loa loa transmission in the absence of point-of-care diagnostic tests. In addition to geo-mapping and chemoprophylaxis, the same preventative strategies used for malaria should be undertaken to avoid contraction of loiasis. Specifically, DEET-containing insect repellent, permethrin-soaked clothing, and thick, long-sleeved, and long-legged clothing ought to be worn to decrease susceptibility to the bite of the mango or deer fly vector. Mosquito nets do not help increase protection against vectors for loiasis as the vectors are day-biting species.

Vector elimination strategies have been researched. It has been shown that the Chrysops vector has a limited flying range, but vector elimination efforts are not common, likely because the insects bite outdoors and have a diverse, if not long, range, living in the forest and biting in the open. No vaccine has been developed for loiasis and there is little report on this possibility.

== Treatment ==
Treatment of loiasis involves chemotherapy or, in some cases, surgical removal of adult worms followed by systemic treatment. The current drug of choice for therapy is diethylcarbamazine (DEC), with the recommended dosage of DEC for adults and pediatrics being 8–10 mg/kg/d taken three times daily for 21 days per the CDC. DEC is effective against microfilariae and somewhat effective against macrofilariae (adult worms). Ivermectin use is another recommended drug, which can substantially reduce the microfilarial load but is not effective against macrofilariae. The recommended dosage of ivermectin is 150 μg/kg in patients with a low microfilaria load (with densities less than 8000 mf/mL).

In patients with high microfilaria load and/or the possibility of an onchocerciasis coinfection, treatment with DEC and/or ivermectin may be contraindicated or require a substantially lower initial dose, as the rapid microfilaricidal actions of the drugs can provoke encephalopathy. In these cases, initial albendazole administration has proved helpful and more effective than ivermectin, which can also be risky despite its slower-acting microfilaricidal effects over DEC. The CDC recommended dosage for albendazole is 200 mg taken twice a day for 21 days. Also, in cases where two or more DEC treatments have failed to provide a cure, subsequent albendazole treatment can be administered.

Management of Loa loa infection in some instances can involve surgery, though the timeframe during which surgical removal of the worm must be carried out is very short. A detailed surgical strategy to remove an adult worm is as follows. The 2007 procedure to remove an adult worm from a male Gabonian immigrant employed proparacaine and povidone-iodine drops, a wire eyelid speculum, and 0.5 ml 2% lidocaine with epinephrine 1:100,000, injected superiorly. A 2-mm incision was made and the immobile worm was removed with forceps. Gatifloxacin drops and an eye-patch over ointment were utilized post surgery and there were no complications.

== Epidemiology ==
As of 2009, loiasis is endemic to 11 countries, all in western or central Africa, and an estimated 12–13 million people have the disease. The highest incidence is seen in Cameroon, Republic of the Congo, Democratic Republic of Congo, Central African Republic, Nigeria, Gabon, and Equatorial Guinea. The rates of Loa loa infection are lower but it is still present in Angola, Benin, Chad, and Uganda. The disease was once endemic to the western African countries of Ghana, Guinea, Guinea Bissau, Ivory Coast and Mali but has since disappeared.

Throughout Loa loa–endemic regions, infection rates vary from 9 to 70 percent of the population. Areas at high risk of severe adverse reactions to mass treatment with ivermectin are at present determined by the prevalence in a population of >20% microfilaremia, which has been recently shown in eastern Cameroon, among other locales in the region.

Endemicity is closely linked to the habitats of the two known human loiasis vectors, Chrysops dimidiata and C. silacea.

Cases have been reported on occasion in the United States but are restricted to travelers who have returned from endemic regions.

In the 1990s, the only method of determining Loa loa intensity was with microscopic examination of standardized blood smears, which is not practical in endemic regions. Because mass diagnostic methods were not available, complications started to surface once mass ivermectin treatment programs started being carried out for onchocerciasis, another filariasis. Ivermectin, a microfilaricidal drug, may be contraindicated in patients who are co-infected with loiasis and have associated high microfilarial loads. The theory is that the killing of massive numbers of microfilaria, some of which may be near the ocular and brain region, can lead to encephalopathy. Cases of this have been documented so frequently over the last decade that a term has been given for this set of complications: neurologic serious adverse events (SAEs).

Advanced diagnostic methods have been developed since the appearance of the SAEs, but more specific diagnostic tests that have been or are currently being developed must be supported and distributed if adequate loiasis surveillance is to be achieved.

There is much overlap between the endemicity of the two distinct filariases, which complicates mass treatment programs for onchocerciasis and necessitates the development of greater diagnostics for loiasis.

In Central and West Africa, initiatives to control onchocerciasis involve mass treatment with ivermectin. However, these regions typically have high rates of co-infection with both L. loa and O. volvulus, and mass treatment with ivermectin can have SAE. These include hemorrhage of the conjunctiva and retina, hematuria, and other encephalopathies that are all attributed to the initial L. loa microfilarial load in the patient before treatment. Studies have sought to delineate the sequence of events following ivermectin treatment that lead to neurologic SAE and sometimes death, while also trying to understand the mechanisms of adverse reactions to develop more appropriate treatments.

In a study looking at mass ivermectin treatment in Cameroon, one of the greatest endemic regions for both onchocerciasis and loiasis, a sequence of events in the clinical manifestation of adverse effects was outlined.

It was noted that the patients used in this study had a L. loa microfilarial load of greater than 3,000 per ml of blood.

Within 12–24 hours post-ivermectin treatment (D1), individuals complained of fatigue, anorexia, headache, joint, and lumbar pain—a bent forward walk was characteristic during this initial stage accompanied by fever. Stomach pain and diarrhea were also reported in several individuals.

By day 2 (D2), many patients experienced confusion, agitation, dysarthria, mutism and incontinence. Some cases of coma were reported as early as D2. The severity of adverse effects increased with higher microfilarial loads. Hemorrhaging of the eye, particularly the retinal and conjunctiva regions, is another common sign associated with SAE of ivermectin treatment in patients with L. loa infections and is observed between D2 and D5 post-treatment. This can be visible for up to 5 weeks following treatment and has increased severity with higher microfilarial loads.

Haematuria and proteinuria have also been observed following ivermectin treatment, but this is common when using ivermectin to treat onchocerciasis. The effect is exacerbated when there are high L. loa microfilarial loads, however, microfilariae can be observed in the urine occasionally. Generally, patients recovered from SAE within 6–7 months post-ivermectin treatment; however, when their complications were unmanaged and patients were left bedridden, death resulted due to gastrointestinal bleeding, septic shock, and large abscesses.

Hypotheses for SAE have been proposed. Though microfilarial load is a major risk factor for post-ivermectin SAE, three main hypotheses have been proposed for the mechanisms. The first hypothesis suggests that ivermectin causes immobility in microfilariae, which then obstructs microcirculation in cerebral regions. This is supported by the retinal hemorrhaging seen in some patients, and is possibly responsible for the neurologic SAE reported. The second hypothesis suggests that microfilariae may try to escape drug treatment by migrating to brain capillaries and further into brain tissue; this is supported by pathology reports demonstrating a microfilarial presence in brain tissue post-ivermectin treatment. The third hypothesis attributes hypersensitivity and inflammation at the cerebral level to post-ivermectin treatment complications, and perhaps the release of bacteria from L. loa after treatment to SAE. This has been observed with the bacteria Wolbachia that live with O. volvulus.

More research into the mechanisms of post-ivermectin treatment SAE is needed to develop drugs that are appropriate for individuals with multiple parasitic infections.

One drug that has been proposed for the treatment of onchocerciasis is doxycycline. This drug is effective in killing both the adult worm of O. volvulus and Wolbachia, the bacteria believed to play a major role in the onset of onchocerciasis while having no effect on the microfilariae of L. loa. In a study done at five different co-endemic regions for onchocerciasis and loiasis, doxycycline was shown to be effective in treating over 12,000 individuals infected with both parasites with minimal complications. Drawbacks to using doxycycline include bacterial resistance and patient compliance because of a longer treatment regimen and the emergence of doxycycline-resistant Wolbachia. However, in the study over 97% of the patients complied with treatment, so it poses as a promising treatment for onchocerciasis while avoiding complications associated with L. loa co-infections.

An area of tremendous concern regarding loiasis is its co-endemicity with onchocerciasis in certain areas of west and central Africa, as mass ivermectin treatment of onchocerciasis can lead to SAEs in patients who have high Loa loa microfilarial densities, or loads. This fact necessitates the development of more specific diagnostics tests for Loa loa so that areas and individuals at a higher risk for neurologic consequences can be identified before microfilaricidal treatment. Additionally, the treatment of choice for loiasis, diethylcarbamazine, can lead to serious complications in and of itself when administered in standard doses to patients with high Loa loa microfilarial loads.

== History ==
The first well-recorded case of Loa loa infection was noted in the Captaincy General of Santo Domingo in 1770. A French surgeon named Mongin tried but failed to remove a worm passing across a woman's eye. A few years later, in 1778, the surgeon François Guyot noted worms in the eyes of West African slaves on a French ship to America; he successfully removed a worm from one man's eye.

The identification of microfilariae was made in 1890 by the ophthalmologist Stephen McKenzie. Localized angioedema, a common clinical presentation of loiasis, was observed in 1895 in the coastal Nigerian town of Calabar—hence the name "Calabar" swellings. This observation was made by a Scottish ophthalmologist named Douglas Argyll-Robertson, but the association between Loa loa and Calabar swellings was not realized until 1910 (by Patrick Manson). The determination of vector—Chrysops spp.—was made in 1912 by the British parasitologist Robert Thomson Leiper.

== Synonyms ==
Synonyms for the disease include African eye worm, loaiasis, loaina, Loa loa filariasis, filaria loa, filaria lacrimalis, filaria subconjunctivalis, Calabar swellings, fugitive swellings, and microfilaria diurnal. Loa loa, the scientific name for the infectious agent, is an Indigenous term itself and there are likely many other terms used from region to region.
