= Setariidae =

Scientific classification
- Kingdom: Animalia
- Phylum: Nematoda
- Class: Chromadorea
- Order: Rhabditida
- Suborder: Spirurina
- Infraorder: Spiruromorpha
- Superfamily: Filarioidea
- Family: Setariidae; Yorke & Maplestone, 1926

Family of spirurian roundworms

Setariidae is a family of nematodes belonging to the order Spirurida.

Genera:

- Dipetalonema Diesing, 1861
- Setaria Viborg, 1795
