= Filariidae =

Scientific classification
- Kingdom: Animalia
- Phylum: Nematoda
- Class: Chromadorea
- Order: Rhabditida
- Family: Filariidae; Weinland, 1858

Genera
- See text

Synonyms
- Stephanofilariidae

Family of nematode worms

Filariidae is a family of nematodes belonging to the order Rhabditida.

== Genera ==
- Bhalfilaria Bhalerao & Krishna Rao, 1944
- Brugia Buckley, 1960
- Cardiofilaria Wehr, 1936
- †Cascofilaria Poinar, 2011
- Dirofilarionema Sonin, 1963
- Filaria Müller, 1787
- Indofilaria Alwar, 1959
- Loa Stiles in Stiles & Hassall, 1905
- Onchocerca Diesing, 1841
- Paracanthocheilonema Vladimirov in Bulginskaya, Vladimirov & Markov, 1959
- Parafilaria Yorke & Maplestone, 1926
- Parasaurositus Gupta & Johri, 1989
- Pseudodiomedenema Gupta & Johri, 1989
- Pseudofilaria Sandground, 1936
- Scytofilaria Wehr, 1936
- Stephanofilaria Ihle & Ihle-Landenberg, 1933
- Struthiofilaria Noda & Nagata, 1976
- Suifilaria Ortlepp, 1937
- Tipasella Seurat, 1921
- Tricheilonema Diesing, 1861
- Wuchereria Silva Aranjo, 1877
