= Mazzotti reaction =

Symptom in nematode infestation treatment

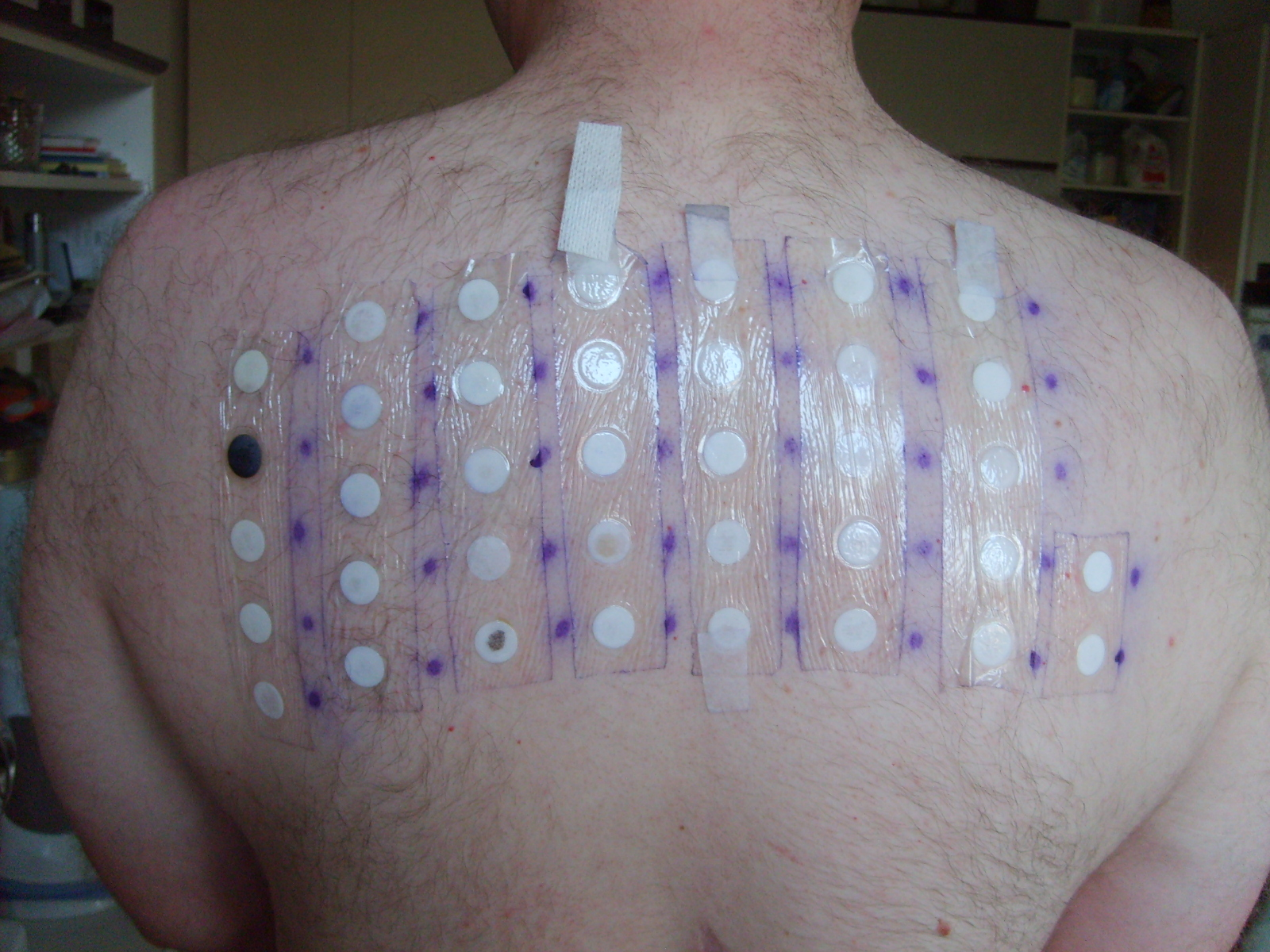
Patch test

The Mazzotti reaction, first described in 1948, is a symptom complex seen in patients after undergoing treatment of nematode infestation, particularly with the medication diethylcarbamazine (DEC). Mazzotti reactions can be life-threatening, and are characterized by fever, urticaria, swollen and tender lymph nodes, tachycardia, hypotension, arthralgias, oedema, and abdominal pain that occur within seven days of treatment of microfilariasis. The Mazzotti reaction correlates with intensity of infection; however, there are probably multiple infection intensity-dependent mechanisms responsible for mediating this complex reaction.

The phenomenon is so common when DEC is used for the treatment of onchocerciasis that this drug is the basis of a skin patch test used to confirm that diagnosis. The drug patch is placed on the skin, and if the patient is infected with the microfilaria of O. volvulus, localized pruritus and urticaria are seen at the application site.

A case of the Mazzotti reaction has been reported after presumptive treatment of schistosomiasis and strongyloidiasis with ivermectin, praziquantel and albendazole. The patient had complete resolution of symptoms after intravenous therapy with methylprednisolone.
