= Brugia pahangi =

Scientific classification
- Kingdom: Animalia
- Phylum: Nematoda
- Class: Chromadorea
- Order: Rhabditida
- Family: Onchocercidae
- Genus: Brugia
- Species: B. pahangi

Binomial name
- Brugia pahangi (Buckley & Edeson, 1956)

Species of roundworm

Brugia pahangi is a parasitic roundworm belonging to the genus Brugia. It is a filarial nematode known to infect the lymph vessels of domestic cats and wild animals, causing a disease filariasis.

== Geographic location ==
Brugia pahangi have been found in cats in Malaysia, Thailand, and Indonesia. A large population of cats, more specifically stray cats, are infected with the parasite. When the nematode was first being studied, a report by Mak et al. (1980) reported that 11% of cats sampled in the Peninsular Malaysia were infected. In Thailand, 25% of the blood samples take from 83 cats residing in Buddhist temples carried the worm (Palmieri et al., 1985).

== Morphology ==
The size is approximately 280 μm long by 5–6 μm wide. The cephalic tip is bluntly rounded. The nerve ring (excretory pore) and the nucleus of the excretory cell are said to be similar to B. malayi. Behind the nerve ring it was found that the cells of the nuclear column over time become less dense. The central viscus (Innenkorper) begin around the middle of the body, the body nuclei are scatter which causes trouble in experiments the reason being that it is difficult to stain. There are four rectal cells ("G" or "R" cells), R_{1} is the most prominent of the rectal cells, and it is about four-fifths of the body width. The anal spot is V-shaped. The nucleus is around 3 μm in diameter. Females are about 38 to 63 mm long. This genus of Brugia is most commonly recognized by the spicules in males, which are needle like mating structures that open the vulva of the female worm.

In the Brugia genus, there are two spicules, they are the shortest in length, the left one being 200–215 μm and the right one 75–90 μm long. Despite the fact that males have certain characteristics that help key this species out, the females lack those key characteristics. However, according to In an experiment done by Knott, 2% of the nematodes he collected had microfilaria that was about 280 μm long.

=== Location inside cats ===
The adults and larvae are found in the lymphatic vessels. There are times in which B.pahangi can be found under the skin and in the corpses of dead cats. Infection happens through transmission of a mosquito. When it bites, inoculation of microfilaria is passed through salivary glands Using Knott's technique, researchers can find the infection through the microfilariae in the blood through a direct smear. These numbers can be extreme, sometimes having more than 10,000 microfilariae per millimeter of blood.

== Diagnosis ==
To find if the cat is infected or not, a blood test is taken. To measure the severity of the infection, the number of microfilariae per microliter of blood is tested.

=== Prevention and treatment ===
There are very few experiments, but there was a study in which a Wolbachia pipientis strain was used to infect Aedea aegypti, Yellow fever mosquito. This shortened the life span of a mosquito, which then reduced the incubation period of B. pahangi. The third larval stage was used. It was seen that the strain did reduce the prevalence in the microfilarial infection. Further experimentation and research can be done with this bacterium to find a way in which to create a preventative.
