= Filariasis =

Parasitic disease caused by a family of nematode worms

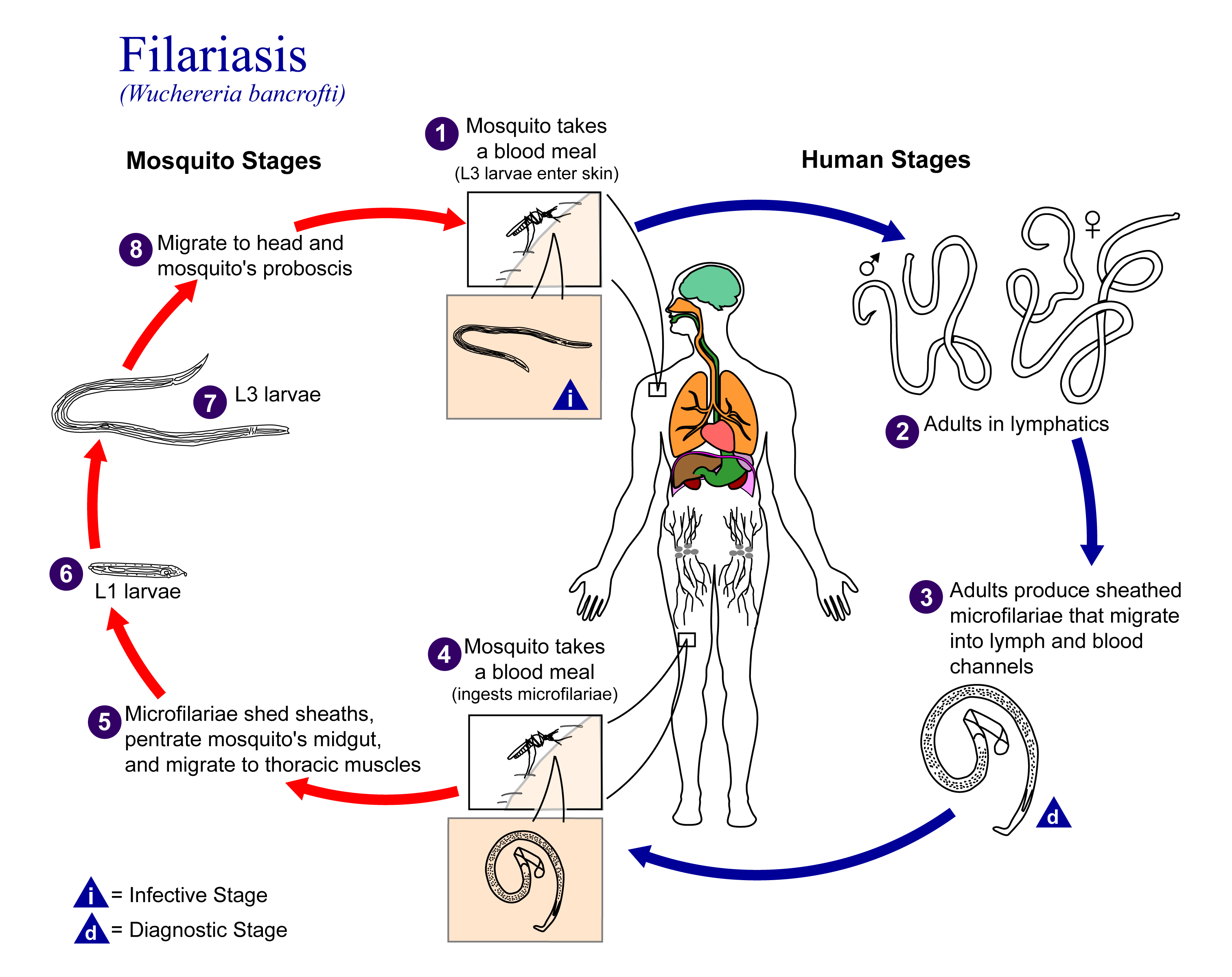
- Life cycle of Wuchereria bancrofti, a parasitic roundworm that causes lymphatic filariasis
- Specialty: Infectious disease

Filariasis (/ˌfɪləˈraɪ.əsəs/) is a filarial infection caused by parasitic nematodes (roundworms) spread by different vectors. They are included in the list of neglected tropical diseases.

The most common type is lymphatic filariasis caused by three species of Filaria that are spread by mosquitoes. Other types of filariasis are onchocerciasis also known as river blindness caused by Onchocerca volvulus; Loa loa filariasis (Loiasis) caused by Loa loa; Mansonelliasis caused by three species of Mansonella, and Dirofilariasis caused by two types of Dirofilaria. All of these worms belong to the superfamily Filarioidea.

== Epidemiology ==
In the year 2000, 199 million infection cases of lymphatic filariasis were predicted with 3.1 million cases in America and around 107 million in South East Asia, making up to 52% of the global cases coming from Bangladesh, India, Indonesia, and Myanmar combined. While the African nations that comprised around 21% of the cases showed a decrease in the trend over a period of 19 years from 2000 to 2018, studies still proved the global burden of infection to be concentrated in southeast Asia.

== Cause ==
Eight known filarial worms have humans as a definitive host. These are divided into three groups according to the part of the body they affect:

- Lymphatic filariasis is caused by the worms Wuchereria bancrofti, Brugia malayi, and Brugia timori. These worms occupy the lymphatic system, including the lymph nodes; in chronic cases, these worms can lead to the syndrome of elephantiasis.
- Loiasis a subcutaneous filariasis is caused by Loa loa (the eye worm). Mansonella streptocerca, and Onchocerca volvulus. These worms occupy the layer just under the skin. O. volvulus causes river blindness.
- Serous cavity filariasis is caused by the worms Mansonella perstans and Mansonella ozzardi, which occupy the serous cavity of the abdomen. Dirofilaria immitis, the dog heartworm, rarely infects humans.

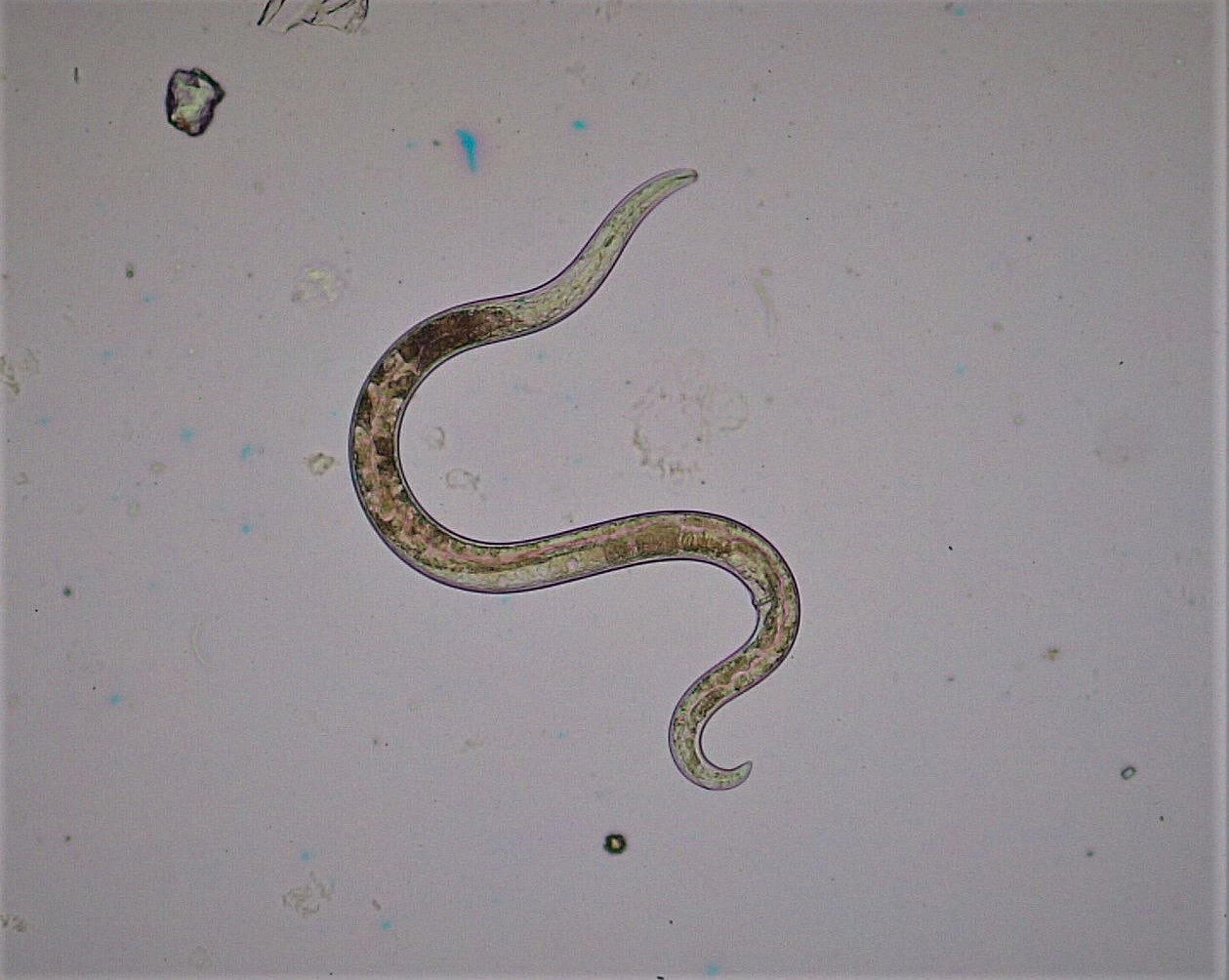
Filariasis is caused by parasitic nematodes

These worms are transmitted by infected mosquitoes of the genera Aedes, Culex, Anopheles and Mansonia. Recent evidence suggests that climate change has an influence in the spread of the parasitic disease and its vectors. Lymphatic filariasis has been the leading cause of permanent disfigurement and continues to be the second most common cause of long-term disability in the world, even after several efforts of curbing the problem.

== Life cycle ==
Wuchereria bancrofti (Wb) belonging to the family Onchocercidae, accounts for more than 90% of filarial infections worldwide. It completes its life cycle across two hosts, human beings are the definitive host while the mosquito is the intermediate host. The most common mosquito vectors that aid in transmission are Anopheles in Africa, Culex in America, Aedes and Mansonia in Asia (Zulfiqar et al., 2023). Female worms are ovoviviparous and can produce thousands of juveniles known as microfilariae, in infected humans. These are ingested by mosquitoes when they bite. The ingested microfilaria mature and eventually migrate to the insect proboscis from where they get injected into the human skin. Here they travel through the dermis to the lymph organs and further mature into male and female worm forms for the next 6 to 12 months and finally reproduce to complete the cycle.

Individuals infected by filarial worms may be described as either "microfilaraemic" or "amicrofilaraemic", depending on whether microfilariae can be found in their peripheral blood. Filariasis is diagnosed in microfilaraemic cases primarily through direct observation of microfilariae in the peripheral blood.

== Signs and symptoms ==
The most spectacular symptom of lymphatic filariasis is elephantiasis – edema with thickening of the skin and underlying tissues—which was the first disease discovered to be transmitted by mosquito bites. Elephantiasis results when the parasites lodge in the lymphatic system.

Cases of acute inflammatory filariasis manifest 5 to 7 day episodes of fever along with inflammation of lymph nodes. It is often accompanied by epididymitis and spermatic cord inflammation. Secondary bacterial infections are very common and are seen to be more severe in previously unexposed immigrants than in native residents. Chronic filarial disease develops gradually over the years. In most patients the lymphatic dilation does not present any physical symptoms. However, inflammatory responses to dying adult worms often lead to chronic lymphedema in the affected regions which then progresses to elephantiasis. W. bancrofti often causes hydrocele and scrotal elephantiasis. Moreover, disruption of lymphatic vessels or aberrant drainage of lymph fluid often leads to chyluria and chyloceles.

Elephantiasis affects mainly the lower extremities, while the ears, mucous membranes, and amputation stumps are affected less frequently. However, different species of filarial worms tend to affect different parts of the body; Wuchereria bancrofti can affect the legs, arms, vulva, breasts, and scrotum (causing hydrocele formation), while Brugia timori rarely affects the genitals. Those who develop the chronic stages of elephantiasis are usually free from microfilariae (amicrofilaraemic), and often have adverse immunological reactions to the microfilariae, as well as the adult worms.

The subcutaneous worms present with rashes, urticarial papules, and arthritis, as well as hyper- and hypopigmentation macules. Onchocerca volvulus manifests itself in the eyes, causing "river blindness" (onchocerciasis), one of the leading causes of blindness in the world. Serous cavity filariasis presents with symptoms similar to subcutaneous filariasis, in addition to abdominal pain, because these worms are also deep-tissue dwellers.

== Diagnosis ==
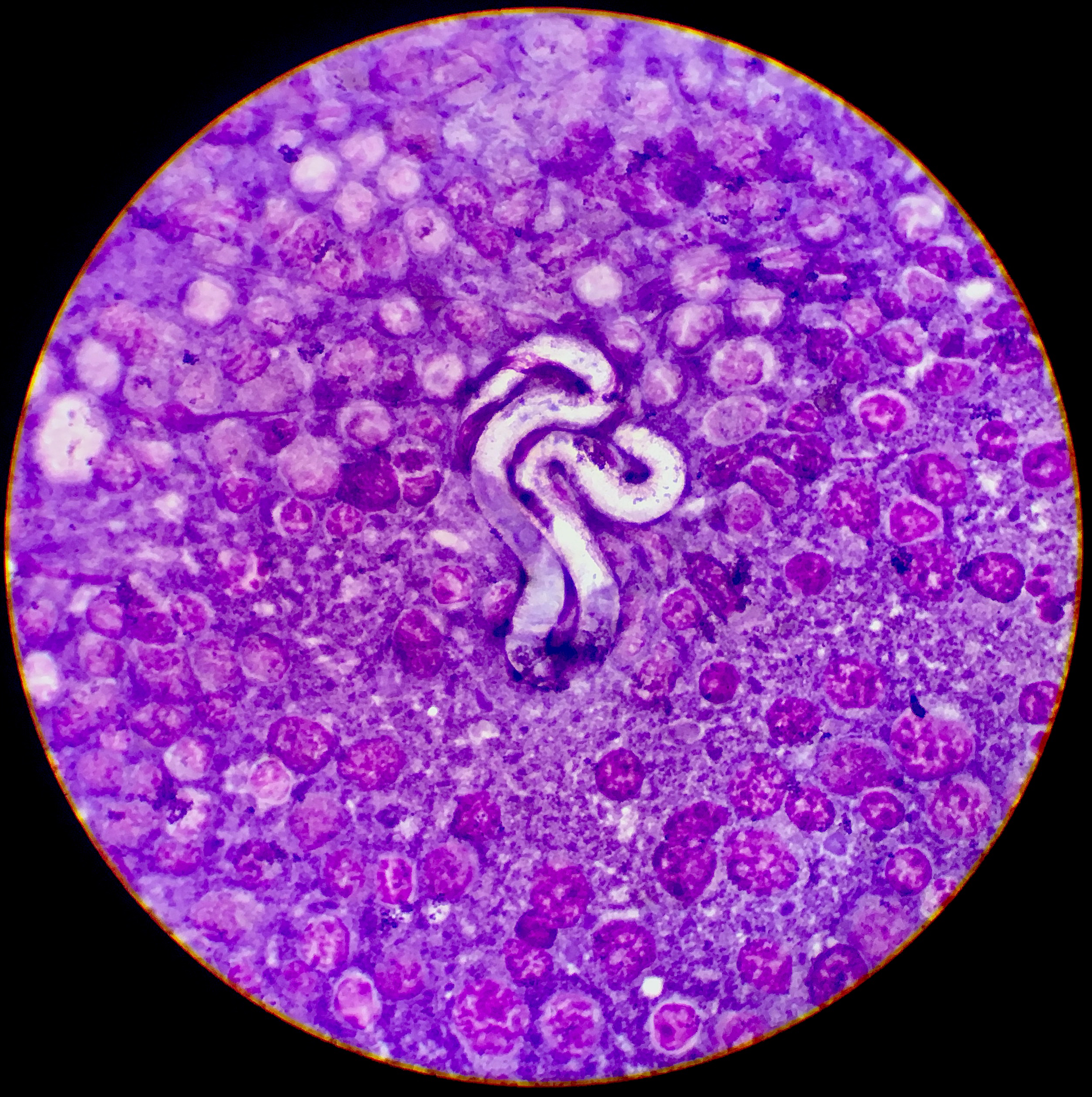
Microfilaria of Dirofilaria immitis (Heartworms) in a lymph node of a dog with lymphoma. This baby nematode is in a pillow of intermediate-to-large, immature lymphocytes, exhibiting multiple criteria of cancer.

Filariasis is usually diagnosed by identifying microfilariae on Giemsa stained, thin and thick blood film smears, using the "gold standard" known as the finger prick test. The finger prick test draws blood from the capillaries of the finger tip; larger veins can be used for blood extraction, but strict windows of the time of day must be observed. Blood must be drawn at appropriate times, which reflect the feeding activities of the vector insects. Examples are W. bancrofti, whose vector is a mosquito; night is the preferred time for blood collection. Loa loa's vector is the deer fly; daytime collection is preferred. This method of diagnosis is only relevant to microfilariae that use the blood as transport from the lungs to the skin. Some filarial worms, such as M. streptocerca and O. volvulus, produce microfilariae that do not use the blood; they reside in the skin only. For these worms, diagnosis relies upon skin snips and can be carried out at any time.

In past, one of the first successes in the efforts to improve sensitivity and specificity of filarial diagnostic tests was identification of the repeated sequences in the parasite genome. The advancement in technologies like polymerase chain reaction (PCR) led to the development of various assays that made large scale surveys of parasitic prevalence much easier.

Filarial parasites are known to induce several immunoregulatory mechanisms like the activation of macrophages and T regulatory cells. It has been found that T regulatory cells play an essential role in how filarial worms modify the host immune response by producing immunoglobulin G4 (IgG4). A very high plasma content of IgG4 has been recorded in asymptomatic patients of LF. Thus, the newer assays measuring IgG4 responses to crude filarial extracts or using fractions of parasite extracts have a better overall specificity but are not efficient in discriminating microfilaremic from amicrofilaremic serum donors. Assays which measure circulating antigen are expected to be better at measuring active infection because only living worms secrete circulating antigen.

As an attempt to come up with immunodiagnostic test kits for detection of circulating filarial antigen, numerous Antigens and Antibodies specific to the parasites have been tested. An Og4C3 monoclonal antibody-based ELISA and an immunochromatographic ( ICT) card test using the same monoclonal antibody have been tested. However, these commercial assays have certain issues with respect to stability, cost and specificity in field applications. Moreover, it was seen that the ICT format showed 25% of microfilarial negative individuals as being positive for circulating filarial antigens.

These commercial tests based on the above circulating antigens are also limited to successful detection of only adult bancroftian worms, making diagnosis only possible in later stages of infection when the therapeutics might no more show effect. A search for worm specific antigens was initiated where SXP-1 antigen was recognized to be specific for W.bancrofti filariasis. The antigen was identified after screening the cDNA library of adult worms with serum from both amicrofilaremic and microfilaremic patients. The native SXP-1 antigen was present in extracts of microfilariae and adult worms and were seen to be not specific to any lifecycle stage.

To identify a W. bancrofti-specific antigen, pastor et al., used the Bm SXP gene to screen against the W.bancrofti Larval stage 3 cDNA library. This led to the identification of a cDNA sequence of W.bancrofti SXP-1 that encoded for a polypeptide with a predicted molecular weight of 20.8 kDa. Wb-SXP was found to be 85 percent identical to the BmSXP polypeptide and differed along the C terminal where the former had an extra 29 amino acid long extension. The WbSXP-1 variant, where a stop codon has been introduced at the amino acid position 153 has been shown to be widely distributed among different W.bancrofti populations. Searches carried out with available sequences from various worms revealed the presence of SXP-1 homologs in many other nematodes with substantial identities in sequence observed during pairwise comparisons. Some examples include O.volvulus (50% identity; Ov-SXP-1), Ascaris suum (43%; As-SXP-1), Loa loa (46%; Li-SXP-1), and C.elegans (29%; Ce-SXP-1).The presence of a number of invariant and conserved residues in all of these nematode-derived molecules suggests that Wb-SXP-1 is a member of a new protein family.

== Treatment ==
The recommended treatment for people outside the United States is albendazole combined with ivermectin. A combination of diethylcarbamazine and albendazole is also effective. Side effects of the drugs include nausea, vomiting, and headaches. All of these treatments are microfilaricides; they have no effect on the adult worms. While the drugs are critical for treatment of the individual, proper hygiene is also required. One review study found that "there is good evidence" that albendazole itself does not contribute to the elimination of microfilaraemia or adult filarial worms, and thus is likely an unnecessary component of albendazole-ivermectin treatment. Diethylcarbamazine-medicated salt is effective in controlling lymphatic filariasis while maintaining its coverage at 90% in the community for six months.

Different trials were made to use the known drug at its maximum capacity in absence of new drugs. In a study from India, it was shown that a formulation of albendazole had better anti-filarial efficacy than albendazole itself.

In 2003, the common antibiotic doxycycline was suggested for treating elephantiasis. Filarial parasites have symbiotic bacteria in the genus Wolbachia, which live inside the worm and seem to play a major role in both its reproduction and the development of the disease. This drug has shown signs of inhibiting the reproduction of the bacteria, further inducing sterility in the nematode. Clinical trials in June 2005 by the Liverpool School of Tropical Medicine reported an eight-week course almost eliminated microfilaraemia.

== Society and culture ==
=== Research teams ===
In 2015 William C. Campbell and Satoshi Ōmura were co-awarded half of that year's Nobel prize in Physiology or Medicine for the discovery of the drug avermectin, which, in the further developed form ivermectin, has decreased the occurrence of lymphatic filariasis.

=== Prospects for elimination ===
Filarial diseases in humans offer prospects for elimination by means of vermicidal treatment. If the human link in the chain of infection can be broken, then notionally the disease could be wiped out in a season. In practice it is not so simple, and there are complications in that multiple species overlap in certain regions and double infections are common. This creates difficulties for routine mass treatment because people with onchocerciasis in particular react badly to treatment for lymphatic filariasis.

== Other animals ==
Filariasis can also affect domesticated animals, such as cattle, sheep, and dogs.

=== Cattle ===
- Verminous hemorrhagic dermatitis is a clinical disease in cattle due to Parafilaria bovicola.
- Intradermal onchocerciasis of cattle results in losses in leather due to Onchocerca dermata, O. ochengi, and O. dukei. O. ochengi is closely related to human O. volvulus (river blindness), sharing the same vector, and could be useful in human medicine research.
- Stenofilaria assamensis and others cause different diseases in Asia, in cattle and zebu.

=== Horses ===
- "Summer bleeding" is hemorrhagic subcutaneous nodules in the head and upper forelimbs, caused by Parafilaria multipapillosa (North Africa, Southern and Eastern Europe, Asia and South America).

=== Dogs ===
- Heart filariasis is caused by Dirofilaria immitis.

== See also ==
- Ascariasis
- Eradication of infectious diseases
- Helminthiasis
- List of parasites (human)
- Neglected tropical diseases
- Wolbachia pipientis
