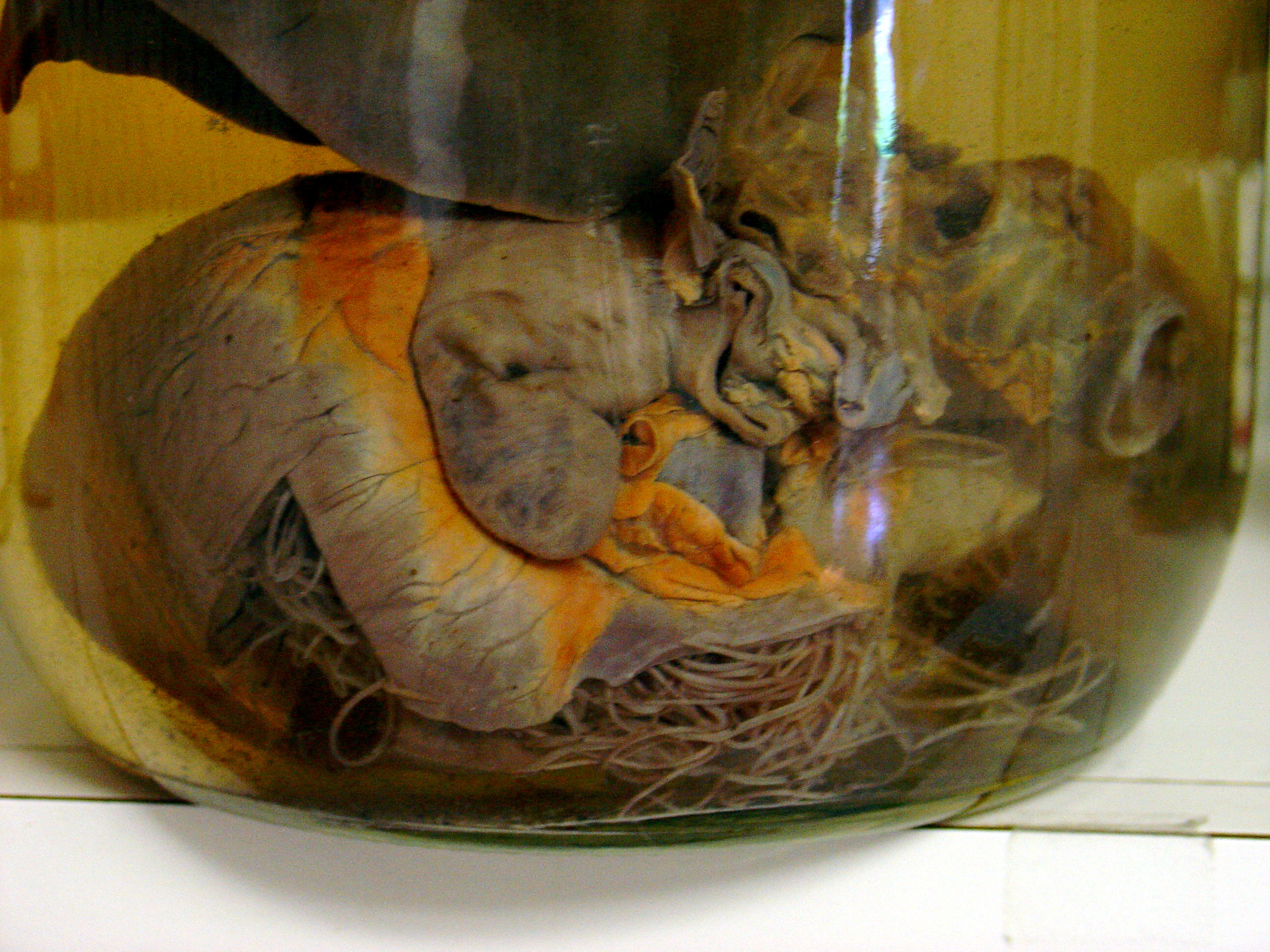
- A German Shepherd dog heart infested with Dirofilaria immitis

Scientific classification
- Kingdom: Animalia
- Phylum: Nematoda
- Class: Chromadorea
- Order: Rhabditida
- Family: Onchocercidae
- Genus: Dirofilaria
- Species: D. immitis

Binomial name
- Dirofilaria immitis (Leidy, 1856)

Synonyms
- Filaria immitis Leidy, 1856

= Dirofilaria immitis =

Species of worm that causes parasitic disease in animals

Dirofilaria immitis, also known as heartworm or dog heartworm, is a parasitic roundworm that is a type of filarial worm, a small thread-like worm, and which causes dirofilariasis. It is spread from host to host through the bites of mosquitoes. Four genera of mosquitoes transmit dirofilariasis, Aedes, Culex, Anopheles, and Mansonia. The definitive host is the dog, but it can also infect cats, wolves, coyotes, jackals, foxes, ferrets, bears, seals, sea lions, and, under rare circumstances, humans.

Adult heartworms often reside in the pulmonary arterial system (lung arteries) as well as the heart, and a major health effect in the infected animal host is damage to its lung vessels and tissues. Heartworm infection may result in serious complications for the infected host if left untreated, eventually leading to death, most often as a result of secondary congestive heart failure.

== Course of infection ==
Lifecycle of D. immitis

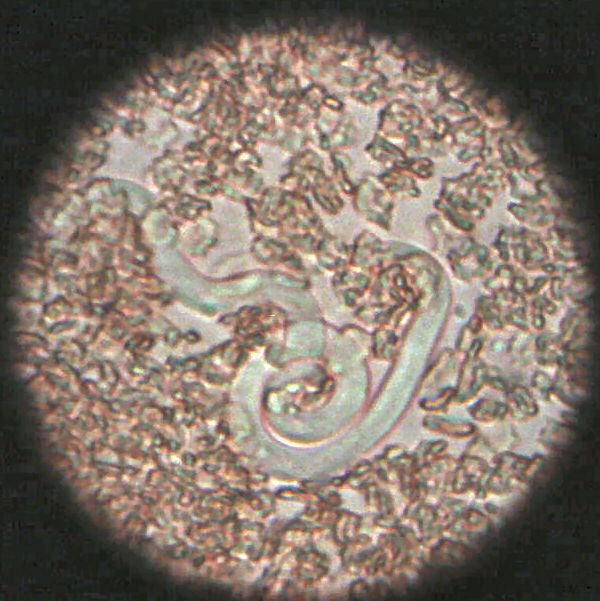
Microfilaria (as seen at 400× magnification)

Heartworms go through several life stages before they become adults infecting the pulmonary artery of the host animal. The worms require the mosquito as an intermediate host to complete their lifecycles. The rate of development in the mosquito is temperature-dependent, requiring about two weeks of temperature at or above 27 °C (80 °F). Below a threshold temperature of 14 °C (57 °F), development cannot occur, and the cycle is halted. As a result, transmission is limited to warm weather, and duration of the transmission season varies geographically. The period between the initial infection when the dog is bitten by a mosquito and the maturation of the worms into adults living in the pulmonary arteries takes six to seven months in dogs and is known as the "prepatent period".

The first larval stage (L_{1}) and second larval stage (L_{2}) of heartworm development occurs within the body of a mosquito. Once the larvae develop into the infective third larval stage (L_{3}), the mosquito locates and bites a host, depositing the larvae under the skin at the site of the bite. After a week or two of further growth, they molt into the fourth larval stage (L_{4}) . Then, they migrate to the muscles of the chest and abdomen, and 45 to 60 days after infection, molt to the fifth stage (L_{5}, immature adult). Between 75 and 120 days after infection, these immature heartworms then enter the bloodstream and are carried through the heart to reside in the pulmonary artery. Over the next three to four months, they increase greatly in size. The female adult worm is about 30 cm (12 in) in length, and the male is about 23 cm (9.1 in), with a coiled tail. By seven months after infection, the adult worms have mated and the females begin giving birth to live young, called microfilariae. Heartworms can live for 5 to 7 years in a dog.

The microfilariae circulate in the bloodstream for as long as two years, and are ingested by bloodsucking mosquitos, where development occurs and the cycle repeats.

== Clinical signs of infection in dogs ==
Dogs show no indication of heartworm infection during the six-month prepatent period prior to the worms' maturation, and current diagnostic tests for the presence of microfilariae or antigens cannot detect prepatent infections. Rarely, migrating heartworm larvae get "lost" and end up in aberrant sites, such as the eye, brain, or an artery in the leg, which results in unusual symptoms such as blindness, seizures, and lameness, but normally, until the larvae mature and congregate inside the heart, they produce no symptoms or signs of illness.

Many dogs show little or no sign of infection even after the worms become adults. These animals usually have only a mild infection and live a fairly sedentary lifestyle. However, active dogs and those with heavier infections may show the classic signs of heartworm disease. Early signs include a cough, especially during or after exercise, and exercise intolerance. In the most advanced cases where many adult worms have built up in the heart without treatment, signs progress to severe weight loss, fainting, coughing up blood, and finally, congestive heart failure.

There are four different classes of symptoms:

- Class 1 – no or mild symptoms with occasional cough.
- Class 2 – mild symptoms with occasional cough and tiredness after moderate activity.
- Class 3 – more severe symptoms, including a generally sick appearance, persistent cough, difficulty breathing, and tiredness after mild activity. Heart and lung changes may be seen with a chest x-ray.
- Class 4 – also called caval syndrome. The blood flowing back to the heart is blocked due to the large mass of worms. This is life-threatening and the only treatment option is surgery.

== Role of Wolbachia pipientis ==
Wolbachia pipientis is an intracellular bacterium that is an endosymbiont of D. immitis. All heartworms are thought to be infected with Wolbachia to some degree. The inflammation occurring at the die-off of adult heartworms or larvae is in part due to the release of Wolbachia bacteria or protein into the tissues. This may be particularly significant in cats, in which the disease seems to be more related to larval death than living adult heartworms. Treating heartworm-positive animals with an antibiotic such as doxycycline to remove Wolbachia may prove to be beneficial as it does for the filariae that cause elephantiasis, but further studies are necessary.

== Diagnosis in dogs ==
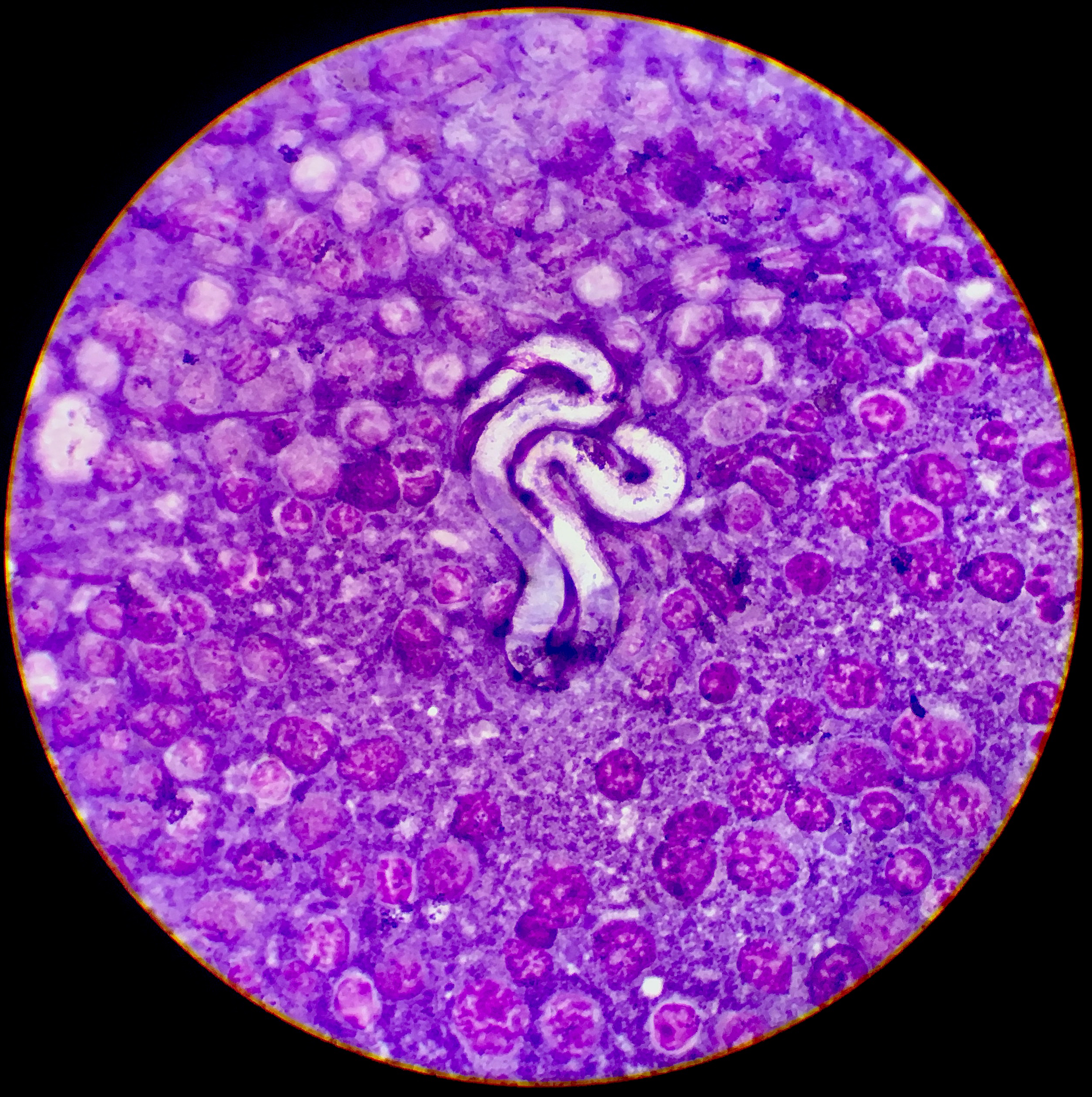
Microfilaria of Dirofilaria immitis (heartworms) in a lymph node of a dog with lymphoma. This baby nematode is in a pillow of intermediate-to-large, immature lymphocytes, exhibiting multiple criteria of cancer.

Microfilarial detection is accomplished by the using one of the following methods:

=== Direct blood smear ===
A blood sample is collected and viewed under the microscope. The direct smear technique allows examination of larval motion, confirming the presence of microfilaria. It also helps in the distinction of D. immitis from Acanthocheilonema reconditum. This distinction is important because the presence of the latter parasite does not pose a health risk to the host. D. immitis usually has stationary body movement, while A. reconditum has progressive movement. However, this method often misses light infections because only a small amount of blood sample is used.

=== Hematocrit tube method ===
This method uses a microhematocrit (or capillary tube) filled with a blood sample that has been centrifuged, separating the plasma from the red blood cells. These layers are divided by the buffy coat. The buffy coat consists of the leukocytes and platelets that are in the sample. The tube is snapped at the buffy coat and added to a slide for microscopic examination. Adding methylene blue stain to the sample may allow greater visibility of any microfilariae. However, the hematocrit tube method will not allow for species differentiation.

=== Modified Knott's test ===
The modified Knott's test is more sensitive because it concentrates microfilariae, improving the chance of diagnosis. A blood sample is mixed with 2% formalin and centrifuged in a tube. The supernatant is removed and methylene blue stain is added to the pellet remaining in the tube for microscopic examination. It allows microfilariae species differentiation based on morphology. Microfilariae can be differentiated between D. immitis and Acanthocheilonema reconditum because of small differences in morphology. The Modified Knott's test is the best method of visual examination when determining presence of microfilaria because it preserves their morphology and size. It is easy to perform, quick, and inexpensive.

The potential for a microfilaremic infection is 5 – 67%. The number of circulating microfilariae does not correlate with the number of adult heartworms, so is not an indicator of disease severity.

=== Antigen testing ===
In most practices, antigen testing has supplanted or supplemented microfilarial detection. Combining the microfilaria and adult antigen test is most useful in dogs receiving diethylcarbamazine or no preventive (macrolides like ivermectin or moxidectin typically render the dog amicrofilaremic). Up to 1% of infected dogs are microfilaria-positive and antigen-negative. Immunodiagnostics (ELISA, lateral flow immunoassay, rapid immunomigration techniques) to detect heartworm antigen in the host's blood are now regularly used. They can detect occult infections, or infections without the presence of circulating microfilariae. However, these tests are limited in that they only detect the antigens released from the sexually mature female worm's reproductive tract. Therefore, false-negative results may occur during the first five to eight months of infection when the worms are not yet sexually mature. The specificity of these tests is close to 100%, and the sensitivity is more than 80%. A recent study demonstrated a sensitivity of only 64% for infections of only one female worm, but improved with increasing female worm burden (85%, 88%, and 89% for two, three, and four female worms, respectively). Specificity in this study was 97%. False-negative test results can be due to low worm counts, immature infections, and all-male infections.

=== X-rays ===
X-rays are used to evaluate the severity of the heartworm infection and develop a prognosis for the animal. Typically, the changes observed are enlargement of the main pulmonary artery, the right side of the heart, and the pulmonary arteries in the lobes of the lung. Inflammation of the lung tissue is also often observed.

== Treatment in dogs ==
If an animal is diagnosed with heartworms, treatment may be indicated. Before the worms can be treated, however, the dog's heart, liver, and kidney function must be evaluated to determine the risks of treatment. Usually, the adult worms are killed with an arsenic-based compound. The currently approved drug in the US, melarsomine, is marketed under the brand name Immiticide. It has a greater efficacy and fewer side effects than the previously used drug thiacetarsamide, sold as Caparsolate, which makes it a safer alternative for dogs with late-stage infections.

After treatment, the dog must rest, and exercise is to be heavily reduced for several weeks so as to give its body sufficient time to absorb the dead worms without ill effect. Otherwise, if the dog is under exertion, dead worms may break loose and travel to the lungs, potentially causing respiratory failure and sudden death. According to the American Heartworm Society, the administering of aspirin to dogs infected with heartworms is no longer recommended due to a lack of evidence of clinical benefit, and aspirin may be contraindicated in several cases. Aspirin had previously been recommended for its effects on platelet adhesion and the reduction of vascular damage caused by the heartworms.

The course of treatment is not completed until several weeks later, when the microfilariae are dealt with in a separate course of treatment. Once heartworm tests are negative and no surviving worm is detected, the treatment is considered a success, and the patient is effectively cured.

Surgical removal of the adult heartworms as a form of treatment may also be indicated, especially in advanced cases with substantial heart involvement and damage.

== Prevention of infection in dogs ==
Prevention of heartworm infection can be obtained through a number of veterinary drugs. The drugs approved for use in the US are ivermectin (sold under the brand names Heartgard, Iverhart, and several other generic versions), milbemycin (Interceptor Flavor Tabs and Sentinel Flavor Tabs) and moxidectin (Simparica Trio) administered as chewable tablets. Moxidectin is also available in both a six-month and 12-month sustained-release injection, ProHeart 6 and ProHeart 12, respectively, administered by veterinarians. This injectable form of moxidectin was taken off the market in the United States due to safety concerns in 2004, but the FDA returned a newly formulated ProHeart 6 to the market in 2008. ProHeart 6 remains on the market in many other countries, including Canada and Japan. Its sister product, ProHeart 12, is used extensively in Australia and Asia as a 12-month injectable preventive. It was approved for use in the United States by the FDA in July 2019. Topical treatments are available, as well. Advantage Multi (imidacloprid plus moxidectin) Topical Solution, uses moxidectin for control and prevention of roundworms, hookworms, heartworms, and whipworms, as well as imidacloprid to kill adult fleas. Selamectin (Revolution) is a topical preventive likewise administered monthly, and can also be used to control fleas, ticks, and mites.

Preventive drugs are highly effective, and when regularly administered, have been shown to protect more than 99% of dogs and cats from heartworm. Most compromises in protection result from the failure to properly administer the drugs during seasonal transmission periods. In regions where the temperature is consistently above 14 °C (57 °F) year-round, a continuous prevention schedule is recommended.

Due to newly emerging resistant strains of heartworms, which no macrocyclic lactone (heartworm prevention) can protect against, the American Heartworm Society recommends dogs be on a repellent and a heartworm preventive. The repellent, such as Vectra 3-D, keeps mosquitoes from feeding on the dog and transmitting the L_{3} stage worms. If a dog is bitten, the heartworm preventive takes over when administered. If a mosquito feeds on a heartworm positive dog on a repellent, they do not live long enough for the microfilaria they ingested to molt into the infective L_{3} larva. Vectra 3-D was tested using thousands of mosquitoes infected with the resistant heartworm strain JYD34. In the control group that was given only a placebo, every dog contracted heartworms. In the experimental group that was given only Vectra 3-D, two of eight dogs contracted heartworms and had an average of 1.5 adult worms each. In the experimental group given both heartworm prevention and Vectra 3-D, one dog was infected with L_{3} stage larvae that did not mature into adulthood due to the heartworm prevention. Using a repellent and a prevention is at least 95% effective.

Ivermectin, even with lapses up to four months between doses, still provides 95% protection from adult worms. This period is called the reach-back effect. Since dogs are susceptible to heartworms, they should be tested annually before they start preventive treatment. Annual heartworm testing is highly recommended for pet owners who choose to use minimal dosing schedules. Testing a dog annually for heartworms and other internal parasites is a fundamental part of a complete heartworm prevention program, and is also recommended for dogs who are already on a monthly prevention program.

== Heartworm infection in cats ==
While dogs are a natural host for D. immitis, cats are atypical hosts. Because of this, differences between canine and feline heartworm diseases are significant. The majority of heartworm larvae do not survive in cats, so unlike in dogs, a typical infection in cats is two to five worms. The lifespan of heartworms is considerably shorter in cats, only two to three years, and most infections in cats do not have circulating microfilariae. Cats are also more likely to have aberrant migration of heartworm larvae, resulting in infections in the brain or body cavities.

The infection rate in cats is 1–5% of that in dogs in endemic areas. Both indoor and outdoor cats are infected. The mosquito vector is known to enter homes.

=== Pathology ===
The vascular disease in cats that occurs when the L_{5} larvae invade the pulmonary arteries is more severe than in dogs. A reaction has been identified in cats: heartworm-associated respiratory disease, which can occur three to four months after the initial infection, and is caused by the presence of the L_{5} larvae in the vessels. The subsequent inflammation of the pulmonary vasculature and lungs can be easily misdiagnosed as feline asthma or allergic bronchitis.

Obstruction of pulmonary arteries due to emboli from dying worms is more likely to be fatal in cats than dogs because of less collateral circulation and fewer vessels. Heartworms can live for 2 to 3 years in cats.

=== Signs and symptoms ===
Acute heartworm disease in cats can result in shock, vomiting, diarrhea, fainting, and sudden death. Chronic infection can cause loss of appetite, weight loss, lethargy, exercise intolerance, coughing, and difficulty breathing. Some cats' immune systems are able to clear a heartworm infection, though the immune system response can cause many of the same symptoms. Also, even if the infection resolves, respiratory damage can cause some symptoms to persist beyond it.

=== Diagnosis ===
Diagnosis of heartworm infection in cats is problematic. Like in dogs, a positive ELISA test for heartworm antigen is a very strong indication of infection. However, the likelihood of a positive antigen test depends on the number of adult female worms present. If only male worms are present, the test will be negative. Even with female worms, an antigen test usually only becomes positive seven to eight months after infection. Therefore, a cat may have significant clinical signs long before the development of a positive test. Heartworm-associated respiratory disease can be found in cats that never develop adult heartworms and therefore never have a positive antigen test.

An antibody test is also available for feline heartworm infection. It will be positive in the event of exposure to D. immitis, so a cat that has successfully eliminated an infection may still be positive for up to three months. The antibody test is more sensitive than the antigen test, but it does not provide direct evidence of adult infection. It can, however, be considered specific for diagnosing previous larval infections, and therefore fairly specific for heartworm-associated respiratory disease.

X-rays of the chest of a heartworm-infected cat may show an increased width of the pulmonary arteries and focal or diffuse opacities in the lungs. Echocardiography is a fairly sensitive test in cats. Adult heartworms appear as double-lined hyperechoic structures within the heart or pulmonary arteries.

=== Treatment and prevention ===
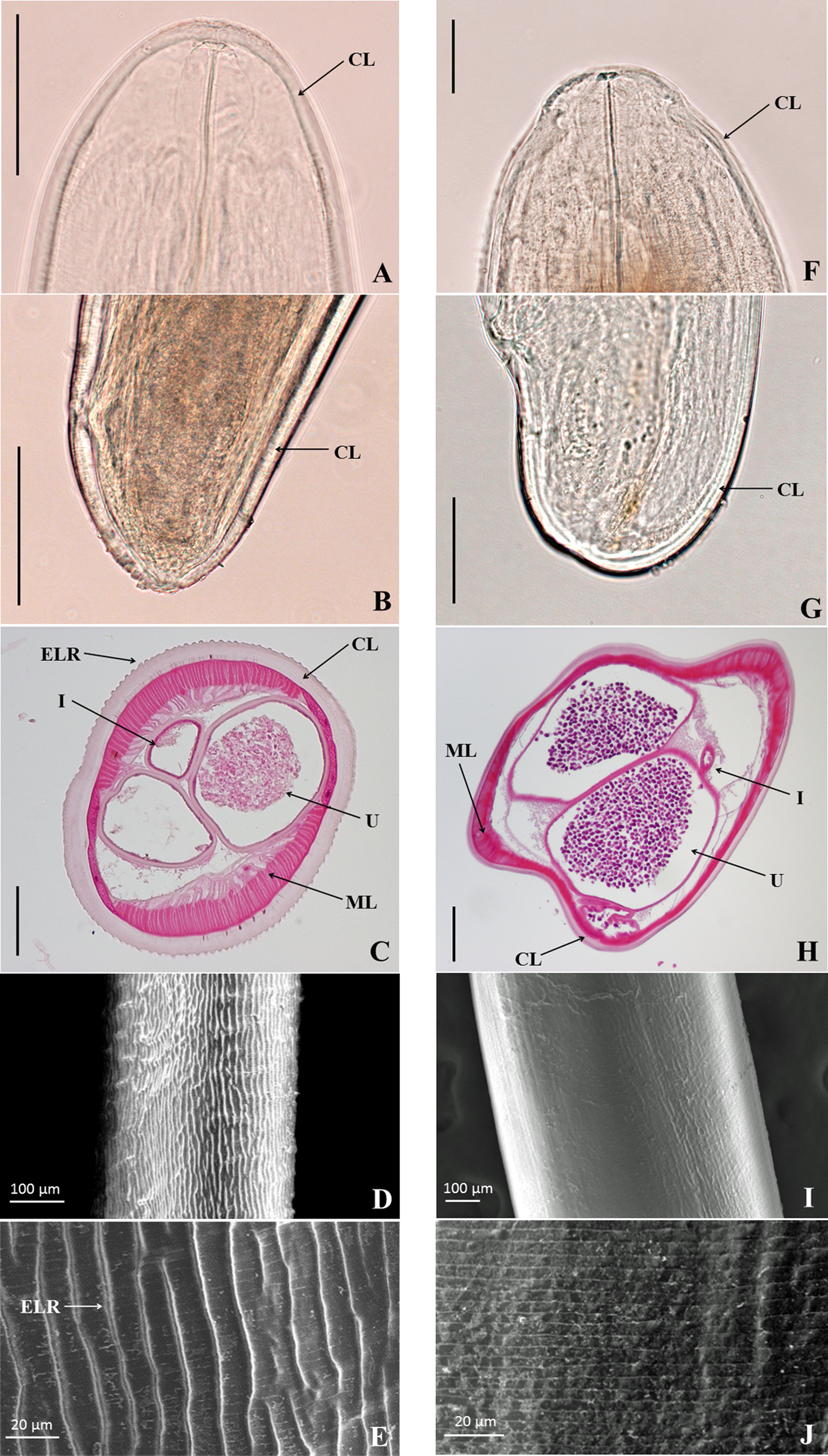
Comparison of probable Dirofilaria repens (left column, from human) and D. immitis (right column, from dog)

Heartworm prevention for cats is available as ivermectin (Heartgard for Cats), milbemycin (Interceptor), or the topical selamectin (Revolution for Cats) and Advantage Multi (imidacloprid + moxidectin) topical solution. Ivermectin, milbemycin, and selamectin are approved for use in cats in the US.

Arsenic compounds have been used for heartworm adulticide treatment in cats, as well as dogs, but seem more likely to cause pulmonary reactions. A significant number of cats develop pulmonary embolisms a few days after treatment. The effects of melarsomine are poorly studied in cats. Due to a lack of studies showing a clear benefit of treatment and the short lifespan of heartworms in cats, adulticide therapy is not recommended, and no drugs are approved in the US for this purpose in cats.

Treatment typically consists of putting the cat on a monthly heartworm preventive and a short-term corticosteroid. Surgery has also been used successfully to remove adult worms. The prognosis for feline heartworm disease is guarded.

== Heartworm infection in humans ==
Dirofilaria are important medical parasites, but diagnosis is unusual and is often only made after an infected person happens to have a chest X-ray following granuloma formation in the lung. The nodule itself may be large enough to resemble lung cancer on the X-ray, and requires a biopsy for a pathologic assessment. This has been shown to be the most significant medical consequence of human infection by the canine heartworm. Patients are infected with the parasite through the bite of an infected mosquito, which is the same mechanism that causes heartworm infection in dogs.

D. immitis is one of many species that can cause infection in dogs and humans. It was thought to infect the human eye, with most cases reported from the southeastern United States. However, these cases are now thought to be caused by a closely related parasite of raccoons, Dirofilaria tenuis. Several hundred cases of subcutaneous infections in humans have been reported in Europe, but these are almost always caused by another closely related parasite, Dirofilaria repens, rather than the dog heartworm. There are proven D. immitis infections, but humans rarely get infected with heartworms due to the larvae never fully maturing. When the heartworm infective larvae migrate through the skin, they often die since heartworms cannot survive in a human host, even if they make it into the bloodstream. Once the heartworms die, the immune system in the human body reacts to their tissue with inflammation as it tries to destroy the heartworms. When this happens, the condition is called pulmonary dirofilariasis.

== Distribution and epidemiology ==
Although at one time confined to the southern United States, heartworm has now spread to nearly all locations where its mosquito vector is found. In the southeast region of the United States, veterinary clinics saw an average of more than 100 cases of heartworm each in 2016. Transmission of the parasite occurs in all of the United States (cases have even been reported in Alaska), and the warmer regions of Canada. The highest infection rates are found within 150 miles (240 km) of the coast from Texas to New Jersey, and along the Mississippi River and its major tributaries. It has also been found in South America, southern Europe, Southeast Asia, the Middle East, Australia, Korea, and Japan.

=== Influence of climate change ===
Warming temperatures caused by climate change will allow mosquitoes that spread the disease to appear in new areas. Heartworm larvae also need temperatures above 14°C for maturation within mosquitos. As climate change increases the temperature, heartworm will be able to expand the geographical range where it is able to mature and transmit.

=== Hosts ===
Hosts of Dirofilaria immitis include:

- Dog
- Cat
- Jackal
- Wolf
- Coyote
- Fox
- Ferret
- Raccoon
- Bear
- Sea lion
- African leopard
- Human (rare)
- Beaver
- Reptiles

Reservoir hosts for D. immitis are coyotes and stray dogs.
