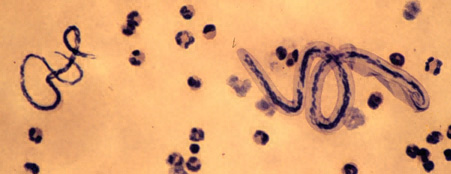
- Mansonella perstans (left) and Loa loa (right)

Scientific classification
- Kingdom: Animalia
- Phylum: Nematoda
- Class: Chromadorea
- Order: Rhabditida
- Family: Onchocercidae
- Genus: Mansonella
- Species: M. perstans

Binomial name
- Mansonella perstans (Manson, 1891)

Synonyms
- Acanthocheilonema perstans Dipetalonema berghei Dipetalonema perstans Dipetalonema semiclarum Esslingeria perstans Filaria perstans Mansonella perstans Mansonella rhodhaini Mansonella semiclarum Meningonema peruzzii Tetrapetalonema berghei Tetrapetalonema perstans

= Mansonella perstans =

Species of roundworm

Mansonella perstans is a filarial (arthropod-borne) nematode (roundworm), transmitted by tiny blood-sucking flies called midges. Mansonella perstans is one of two filarial nematodes that causes serous cavity filariasis in humans. The other filarial nematode is Mansonella ozzardi. M. perstans is widespread in many parts of sub-Saharan Africa, parts of Central and South America, and the Caribbean.

Compared to infections with other filarial parasites such as Wuchereria bancrofti, Brugia malayi, and Loa loa, Mansonella infections are relatively mild. However, the pathogenicity of M. perstans infection has been recently reconsidered in various studies. These studies have demonstrated that M. perstans has the ability to induce a variety of clinical features, including angioedema Calabar-like swellings, pruritus, fever, headache, eosinophilia, and abdominal pain. The overall disability among populations in regions where filariae are endemic has been difficult to determine because of high rates of coinfection with other filariae and the nonspecificity of M. perstan infections. Furthermore, treatment of M. perstans is challenging because the most common antinematode drugs, ivermectin, diethylcarbamazine, and albendazole are not effective. The optimal treatment for M. perstans infection remains unclear. Most current studies are focused on coinfection of M. perstans with other filarial parasites, and the study of Wolbachia bacteria as endosymbionts in M. perstans and other filarial parasites.

== History of discovery ==
In 1890, the microfilariae of M. perstans were first discovered by Manson in the blood of a patient from West Africa who was hospitalized with sleeping sickness in London. Because the microfilariae were first noted in a patient with African trypanosomiasis, M. perstans was initially suspected to be the cause of this disease. M. perstans as the cause of African trypanosomyasis was later ruled out by the Royal Society Sleeping Sickness Commission, who showed the geographical distribution of sleeping sickness did not coincide with that of M. perstans infection.

Upon their discovery, the microfilariae were named Filaria sanguinis hominis minor, due to their relatively small size when compared to another type of microfilarae found in the same patient (Filaria sanguinis hominis major, which is now known as Loa loa). The name was later changed to Filaria sanguinis hominis perstans, and later again shortened to Filaria perstans to comply with the binary system of nomenclature. Over time, the name continued to change as changes in the generic status of the parasite took place. In 1984, Eberhard and Orihel redefined the genus Mansonella and included the M. perstans species in it, so it is currently known as M. perstans.

The adult worms of M. perstans were first recovered during the dissection of two cadavers sourced from British Guiana. While an insect vector was hypothesized, it took many years of investigation before the true vector of M. perstans was discovered.

== Clinical presentation in humans ==
While Mansonella infections are often asymptomatic, they can be associated with angioedema (similar to Calabar swellings of loaisis), recurrent pruritic subcutaneous lesions, fever, headaches, arthralgia, and neurologic manifestations. Eosinophilia, headache, fever, or abdominal pain may also be present. M. perstans may also present with a condition known as kampala, or Ugandan eye worm. This occurs when adult worms of M. perstans invade the conjunctiva or periorbital connective tissues in the eye. This condition was first attributed to M. perstans in Uganda, when six patients presented with nodules in the conjunctiva. The adult worms were identified as adult female M. perstans in five of these six cases. The symptoms of M. perstans may be confounded with those of other filarial infections, such as onchocerciasis, lymphatic filariasis and loiasis, because coinfection often occurs.

== Case study ==
A 36-year-old man was admitted to the outpatient clinic at the Goundi Missionary Hospital in the south of Chad in May 2001. He complained of visual impairment in the left eye, ocular and abdominal pruritus, and abdominal pain. He had previously been treated with DEC for M. perstans infection five months prior to his visit. A blood sample was taken at 11:00 am, and examined microscopically as a thick blood film stained with Giemsa's solution. The thick blood film revealed the presence of M. perstans, and no other parasites were found. He had 3% eosinophilia. A visual acuity test showed a reduction of visual acuity to 4/10 for the left eye, while the right eye was 9/10. However, no abnormalities were observed during examination of the anterior left eye chamber. Upon examination of the fundus of his left eye, a narrow, white, motionless, and linear lesion of 6–7 mm was found. He was then treated with a second course of DEC (400 mg daily in two doses for eight days, after a three-day dosage increase), and by the end of treatment, he did not have pruritus, but his visual impairment was unchanged. The M. perstans burden was significantly reduced, and the peripheral eosinophil count decreased to 1%. He was then treated with mebendazole (100 mg twice a day, for 14 days), and at the end of his treatment, his visual impairment was the only symptom remaining. After a week, with no further treatment, his vision improved and acuity was increased to 8/10 in the left eye. While ocular symptoms occur quite frequently in symptomatic M. perstans infection, intraocular localization had not been described prior to this study. This case also is an example of the difficulty of treating mansonelliasis, and shows that combined drug regimens can be more effective than treatment using a single drug.

== Other relevant clinical information ==
M. perstans might potentially interfere with the host's regulatory mechanisms and influence the outcome of other infections, such as malaria, tuberculosis and HIV, which often thrive in similar environments.

Recent research has also focused on coinfection of M. perstans and other filarial parasites. A study examining the epidemiology of Loa loa, Onchocerca volvulus, and M. perstans in the rain forest villages of Cameroon found a high prevalence of coinfection with O. voluvulus and M. perstans. It also found a low prevalence of L. loa and O. voluvulus coinfection, as well as low prevalence of L. loa and M. perstans coinfection. Coinfection also has significant implications for treatment, because efficacious drugs for M. perstans are different from those for most filarial infections.

Another study evaluated the effectiveness of ivermectin and albendazole in M. perstans and Wuchereria bancrofti coinfection in a filarial endemic region of Mali, finding that M. perstans infection did not have a significant effect on the treatment of W. bancrofti. Other studies have evaluated the efficacy of other treatments on co-infection with other filarial parasites and M. perstans.

== Transmission ==
M. perstans is transmitted by the bite of species of Culicoides midges. Only the female midges take blood meals, because the blood is needed for the maturation of eggs within the female.

Various species of Culicoides can be found worldwide, and in some areas, their high numbers make them a biting nuisance to humans and domestic animals. Culicoides species are stout flies with short vertical probosces and wings folded scissor-like over their abdomens at rest. They generally measure 1–4 mm in length. The wings of most species have a pattern of light and dark marks. While certain species of Culicoides, such as C. austeni and C. grahamii have been hypothesized to play a larger role than other species in the transmission of M. perstans, very few studies have attempted to identify the species of vectors of M. perstans in endemic areas. This issue is further complicated because the taxonomy of tropical Culicoides species is still uncertain.

Biting midges progress from egg, to larva, pupa, and finally the adult stage. The complete cycle takes 2–6 wk, and is dependent on environmental conditions. The females usually bite around dawn and dusk, although often at other times. Eggs are laid 3–4 d after the blood meal, and about 70-180 eggs are laid each time. Moisture is essential for the vector, and the development of its eggs and larvae. Adults survive for a few weeks, and their flight range is limited to a few hundred meters from their larval habitats.

== Reservoir ==
Humans are the only known reservoir for M. perstans. No animal reservoirs for M. perstans occur as there are for Mansonella streptocerca.

== Morphology ==
Adults are white and thread-like, and have been found to be cylindrical in shape. Males are 35–56 mm long and 45–60 μm wide. Females are bigger, 70–80 mm long and 80–120 μm wide. The tail is half a coil in females and a full coil in males. Adult worms are rarely seen, but sometimes can be recovered from a laparotomy or autopsy.

Microfilariae of M. perstans are unsheathed, have blunt tails, and their nuclei extend to the end of the tail. The microfilariae have a length of 200 μm, and a width of 4.5 μm. They have the ability to elongate and contract, so they can vary in measurement and form. They are smaller than those of Loa loa, which have tapered tails and are frequently coiled. The microfilariae of M. perstans are smaller than those of W. bancrofti and the caudal end is blunt with a terminal nucleus.

== Lifecycle ==
https://web.archive.org/web/20090115010310/http://www.dpd.cdc.gov/dpdx/html/frames/a-f/filariasis/body_Filariasis_m_perstans.htm

During a blood meal, an infected midge (Culicoides grahami and C. austeni) introduces third-stage (L3) filarial larvae onto the skin of the human host, where they penetrate into the bite wound. Body heat likely activates the larvas and prompts them to leave the vector and actively penetrate the skin.

The third-stage larvae develop into adults that live in body cavities, most commonly the pleural and peritoneal cavities. They also can live in mesentery, perirenal spaces, retroperitoneal spaces, or the pericardium, and mature into adults.

Adults in the body cavities mate and produce unsheathed and subperiodic microfilariae that reach the bloodstream. The microfilariae can also be found in the cerebrospinal fluid. While the periodicity of these midges has been unclear, the most recent study suggests microfilariae indicate a weak but significant diurnal periodicity with a peak around 8 am.

A midge ingests microfilariae during a blood meal. After ingestion, the microfilariae migrate from the midge's midgut through the hemocoel to the thoracic muscles of the midge. In the thoracic muscles, the microfilariae develop into second-stage larvae. They subsequently develop into third-stage larvae, which are infective.

The third-stage larvae migrate to the midge's proboscis, where they can infect another human when the midge takes a blood meal.

== Diagnostic tests ==
Similar to other filarial parasites, M. perstans is diagnosed by the identification of microfilariae in the peripheral blood. Because the microfilariae are present in the peripheral blood in almost equal concentrations during day and night, blood samples can be obtained at any time (unlike other filarial microfilariae). The microfilariae are short and thin, unsheathed, and have rounded tails with nuclei at the extremity. The head spot sometimes has a V-shaped appearance. The blood sample can be a thick smear, stained with Giemsa or hematoxylin and eosin. For increased sensitivity, concentration techniques can be used. These include centrifugation of the blood sample lysed in 2% formalin (Knott's technique), or filtration through a Nucleopore® membrane. Serology is not very useful for diagnosis. Because the adult worms live mainly in pleural and peritoneal cavities, they are only rarely observed. At times, they can be observed during a laparotomy. M. perstans often occurs with other filarial infections, such as onchocerciasis and lymphatic filariasis. It should be distinguished from Microfilaria semiclarum (a parasite of animals which sometimes causes accidental infections in humans). Sometimes, confusion is possible if the blood smear is randomly infected during or after preparation with a mould such as Helicospora. This organism, however, is considerably smaller and thinner than a microfilaria. The DEC, or Mazzotti test, has been shown to have minor effects on microfilariae intensity, but it is not of practical use for diagnosis of mansonelliasis.

== Management and treatment ==
M. perstans is one of the most difficult human filarial infections to treat. Effective treatment for mansonelliasis is lacking, with no consensus among the scientific community on the optimal approach. Numerous trials evaluating traditional antifilarial drugs such as ivermectin and DEC, as well as other benzimidazoles such as mebendazole, albendazole, levamisole, and thiabendazole, have been conducted. Recently, clinical trials assessing the effectiveness of doxycycline to treat M. perstans infection have also been documented.

Generally, DEC is ineffective in the treatment of M. perstans infection. Other drugs such as ivermectin and praziquantel have been tried, but are neither reliable nor rapidly effective. Mebendazole and thiabendazole have a greater effect than previously described drugs, but are not sufficient for treatment alone. Combination treatments with DEC and mebendazole have had the most success. In the most recent clinical trials, doxycycline has had success comparable to, if not better than, that of combination treatments. However, because it is a relatively recent discovery, the use of doxycycline is relatively limited to clinical trials. If the patient is asymptomatic, no treatment is necessary. An analysis of the results of various clinical trials for each drug is illustrated below:

=== Diethylcarbamazine ===
While diethylcarbamazine (DEC) is the most common drug used to treat M. perstans infection, it is often ineffective, especially with the administration of only a single dose. In a 2005 study of 160 patients with symptomatic M. perstans infection in south Chad, DEC was administered in 200 mg. doses, twice daily for 21 days with a gradual dosage increase in the first three days. The single course of DEC lowered microfilarae in 80% of subjects, but did not eliminate the infection or related symptoms. A second course was therefore administered, and was successful in eliminating the microfilarial burden in most cases. No persistent effect of DEC on Microfilaria was noted on long-term follow up. These results accurately represent the general efficacy of DEC in treating M. perstans: two doses are necessary to eliminate the microfilarial burden temporarily, but no persistent effect of DEC on microfilariae was shown long-term. Furthermore, symptoms are usually not entirely alleviated by DEC. It has not been reported to cause adverse side effects in patients with M. perstans infection.

=== Ivermectin ===
While ivermectin is considered a first-line agent for the treatment of many filarial diseases (especially onchocerciasis), it has shown little or no efficacy against M. perstans at a dose of 200 μg/kg body weight or at a dose of 600 μg/kg body weight. A 2009 study in Uganda evaluated the effects of ivermectin, albendazole, and a combined regimen of both drugs on M. perstans infected individuals: Single doses of ivermectin alone had no marked effect on M. perstans microfilaraemias in the 12 months after treatments, with the counts remaining to pretreatment values. This is consistent with the findings of previous studies which have suggested ivermectin, when used alone, has little or no effect on M. perstans microfilaraemias. A reduction of microfilariae in patients has been noted, but it takes a long time to achieve (over 3 yr of administration of ivermectin), and is thus not useful in the short term for symptomatic patients.

=== Albendazole ===
Single doses of albendazole alone have been consistently reported to have little or no effect on M. perstans microfilaremias in 6 and 12 m after treatment, with counts of microfilaremias remaining close to pretreatment values. More recent studies have shown the drug to be more effective at high doses for prolonged periods of time. No side effects have been reported from recent studies.

=== Mebendazole ===
Mebendazole, another possible treatment for M. perstans filariasis, has been shown to be effective in significantly reducing microfilariae levels. It has been more effective than both ivermectin and DEC—with a greater number of responders, a more significant reduction in microfilariae levels, and the ability to eliminate the infection more efficiently.

=== Thiabendazole ===
Thiabendazole has been shown to result in a small but significant decrease in microfilariae and in eosinophil count, and symptoms as treatment for symptomatic M. perstans infection. These markers were reduced even further following the administration of the second dose, showing that thiabendazole may be effective in M. perstans infection. In a recent comparative study, thiabendazole at a higher activity than single drug treatments such as ivermectin, DEC, and mebendazole, but lower activity than the combined regimen of mebendazole and DEC. However, more research may be needed into confirm the correct dosage and true effectiveness of thiabendazole in combating M. perstans infection.

=== Praziquantel ===
Praziquantel is effective against various helminthic and protozoan infections. The few studies about the use of praziquantel against M. perstans infection do not support its use for treatment of mansonelliasis.

=== Doxycycline ===
Doxycycline has been shown to decrease the development, embryogenesis, and fertility of worms in species that harbor the intracellular endosymbiont Wolbachia. Wolbachiae are bacterial endosymbionts of insects and many filarial nematodes, such as Onchocerca volvulus, Wuchereria bancrofti, and Brugia malayi. The dependence of these parasites on their endosymbionts has led to the use of antibiotics directed against the wolbachiae, antibiotics that have been demonstrated to have a profound salutary effect on filarial infections. In 2009, Coulibaly et al. conducted an open-label randomized trial of doxycycline, an antibiotic, for Mansonella perstans infection. This resulted in a dramatic and sustained decrease in microfilarial levels: they decreased to 23% of pretreatment levels at 6 m after treatment and to 0% of pretreatment levels at 12 m after treatment. In addition, doxycycline has been shown to have macrofilaricidal activity, which is unique among the drugs for filariasis.

However, in some areas, such as Gabon and Uganda, Wolbachia endosymbionts have not been detected in the microfilariae of M. perstans. This suggests some geographic isolates of M. perstans may have lost (or gained) the endosymbiont. This presents a controversial argument for the use of doxycycline as treatment of filarial infections. On one hand, doxycycline has been shown to be one of the only successful treatments for M. perstans, and could facilitate the eradication of filarial parasites. However, some scientists argue that the treatment of filariasis with doxycycline may select worms that will have already integrated Wolbachia genes into their genome, which could potentially have unforeseen consequences. Such lateral gene transfer has occurred in various geographic isolates of B. malayi, in which a fraction of the Wolbachia endosybmiont genome is integrated into the chromosome of its nematode host (the parasite). When this integration occurs, Wolbachia can no longer be targeted as means for treatment for filariasis.

=== Combination regimens ===
Combination treatments consisting of DEC plus mebendazole, or ivermectin and albendazole, have been shown to result in a highly significant fall in microfilariae. Other studies have challenged these findings, suggesting the combination treatment of ivermectin and albendazole does not significantly reduce microfilariae levels more than a single treatment regimen.

== Epidemiology ==
M. perstans is found in tropical Africa, central and eastern South America, Central America, and the Caribbean. The parasite is widespread in many parts of sub-Saharan Africa. Infections have been reported from 33 countries in this region. In certain locations, extremely high proportions of the inhabitants show signs of infection. It often occurs among poor populations living in rural villages. M. perstans is also found in the Americas in Venezuela, Trinidad, Guyana, Suriname, northern Argentina and the Amazon basin. This parasite does not occur in Asia. It also does not occur in the most northern and southern regions of Africa. An estimated 114 million people in Africa are infected with M. perstans today.

== Public health and prevention strategies ==
The ongoing large-scale programs for control of onchocerciasis and lymphatic filariasis have paid little attention to mansonelliasis. Despite the high prevalence of M. perstans in areas of tropical Africa, such as Uganda, the Congo, the Republic of Cameroon, and Gabon, no vector programs have been instituted for any of the mansonelliasis-causing parasites. Major reasons for this lack of attention are that M. perstans infections prevail in poor, rural populations and that infection with the parasite has not been linked with a clear and distinct medical picture. Much of the information regarding M. perstans has been obtained as a byproduct from studies of other filarial parasites. Mansonelliasis can thus be classified as one of the most neglected among the neglected tropical diseases. Culicoides midges are small enough to pass through screening or mosquito nets, so these would not be helpful. Protection of visitors to endemic areas can be achieved through the use of insect repellents.

== See also ==
- Mansonelliasis
