= Wayne M. Meyers =

American physician, microbiologist, chemist, humanitarian, and medical missionary

Wayne Marvin Meyers
- American physician, microbiologist, chemist, humanitarian, Medical Missionary
- Born: August 28, 1924; Huntingdon County, Pennsylvania, U.S.
- Died: September 12, 2018 (aged 94); Glen Burnie, Maryland, U.S.
- Education: Juniata College
- Scientific career
- Fields: Medicine; Chemistry; Microbiology; Leprosy, Buruli ulcer
- Workplaces: Armed Forces Institute of Pathology, Washington DC; Hawaii, Burundi, DRC,

Wayne Marvin Meyers (August 28, 1924 – September 12, 2018) was an American physician, microbiologist, chemist, humanitarian, and medical missionary. He pioneered new medical techniques, discovered new infectious agents, and trained countless researchers and scientists. Meyers was particularly well known for his work with Hansen's disease (Leprosy), Buruli ulcer, and filarial diseases.

== Biography ==
Meyers was born on a small farm in west central Pennsylvania, in Huntingdon County. Most of his ancestors were farmers. His father was a farmer and a carpenter, and worked as a carpenter on steamboats going up and down the Mississippi from Pittsburgh to New Orleans. His mother was born on the farm that she lived on all her life. Meyers attended the local elementary one-room school and later went to a consolidated high school in Saxton, Pennsylvania. In 1941 he started his studies at Juniata College, in Huntingdon, Pennsylvania, where he majored in chemistry and mathematics.

His studies were interrupted by World War II. He was drafted in 1944, when he was more than three years through college, and served in a signal company in an infantry division, in the South Pacific. He spent most of his service time in the Philippines serving mainly as a cryptographer in the 43rd Infantry Division. At the end of World War II, he was in Luzon, and went to Japan in the Army of Occupation.

After the war, he was able to return to Juniata College and obtain his chemistry degree. Then he went to work with U.S. Steel as a research chemist in Pittsburgh. He wanted, however, to do humanitarian work, and having a strong religious background he decided that perhaps missionary work would be the best way to fulfill this. So, he went to Moody Bible Institute in Chicago. During that time, he realized that medicine was the field in which he could best serve. To accomplish this he returned for a year to Juniata College and completed his biology studies for medical school and thereafter obtained a scholarship at the University of Wisconsin, where he completed his degree in medical microbiology. He obtained his MS in 1953, and his PhD in 1955. Following that, he went to medical school at Baylor College of Medicine, in Houston. To support his family, he was an instructor in microbiology and did research in the microbiology department while attending medical school.

Meyers graduated medical school in 1959, and did his internship in Johnstown, Pennsylvania. Then, with missionary medicine in mind, he worked in a hospital in Michigan, doing primarily surgery. He finished his surgical experience in the US around October 1961, and went to Africa, under the auspices of the American Leprosy Missions.

Meyers married Esther Kleinschmidt (a relative of Franz Heinrich Kleinschmidt) in August 1953. Esther's parents went to Africa in 1923, and she grew up in the Belgian Congo. Esther's father died in the Congo in 1964 and is buried in northeastern Democratic Republic of the Congo. They had four children, Amy, George, Daniel, and Sara.

== Medical missionary ==
He served in a one-doctor hospital in a remote area of Burundi near the Tanzania border. Burundi at that time was a country in turmoil because the Tutsi and the Hutu were at war with each other. There was rebellion. In fact, the prime minister had been assassinated no more than two days before Meyers' arrival in the capital city of Usumbura. Burundi was a protectorate under the Belgian government following the First World War and was still under Belgian rule when Meyers and his family arrived for work. There had also been three successive crop failures, and Burundi was dealing with a famine. Meyers did as much famine relief work as he did medicine. There were 600 patients in the leprosarium, and his hospital was the only one within about 50 kilometers. Thus, persons with all kinds of medical problems went to the little hospital. Leprosy was a major problem in Burundi. Estimates were then 5-10,000 leprosy patients among 3–4 million inhabitants.

Medications were limited, but sulfones were available, and he was able to provide treatment for a great many people, and care for the physical disabilities of most of the leprosy patients. The following year, 1962, he and his family moved to what was then Zaire (the Democratic Republic of the Congo), to work in Kivu in extreme eastern part of the country, near the base of the Ruwenzori Mountains. There was a tremendous opportunity for work among leprosy patients there. In Kivu, Meyers was in charge of a leprosarium with between 2,000 and 3,000 patients. At that time, leprosy patients were nearly all treated as in-patients.

This was a dangerous time to be in the DRC; the land was in the early stages of the Congo Crisis. Joseph Mobutu had seized power in a military coup and soon arrested, tortured, and eventually had the elected Prime Minister Patrice Lumumba killed. Soon after Meyers and his family arrived a rebellion swept through their area. It began south, around Albertville, and swept north, eventually to involve nearly half the country, on a line diagonally drawn between the Ubangi and the Shaba area. The Leprosarium was right along the Uganda border. Because of health reasons for one of their daughters, Meyers and his wife, Esther left the little jungle hospital just a couple of months before the rebels arrived and were not captured, however, all of their belongings and personal effects were lost. They had hoped to return, but with the rebellion, it was impossible to enter at that time. So the American Leprosy Missions moved the family to the Bas-Congo (Lower Congo), about halfway between Matadi and Kinshasa.

The hospital in the Bas-Congo, was much larger, about a 450-bed hospital, and they had many services and more physicians. So there was an opportunity to concentrate on leprosy. The medical missionaries developed a leprosy program that involved some 20 outlying centers. All leprosy patients were eventually discharged from the leprosarium, and seen and treated in these outlying centers, which Meyers visited regularly by Land Rover or by airplane. Meyers was also responsible for the dermatology at the hospital, and also for the laboratory and pathology. In addition to leprosy, Meyers encountered many other diseases including some which would later become part of his great life work, buruli ulcer and streptocerciasis.

Meyers and his family lived in the Bas-Congo from 1965 until 1973. Though the HIV/AIDS epidemic was unknown to the world at that time, with current knowledge it appears that HIV/AIDS was already present in the area. Meyers traveled extensively through the African region going to different mission stations, universities and other teaching centers in order to develop the leprosy service in the country. During these visits, especially those in the Stanleyville (Kisangani) area where AIDS may have arisen, Meyers and his colleagues saw patients whose symptoms fit the definition of AIDS and may well have been victims of that disease. It was established that some sera were taken by the Belgians as early as 1959 were positive for HIV. Specifically, David Ho and colleagues from the Aaron Diamond AIDS Research Center in New York told a conference that using that sera from 1959 they identified a case of HIV infection to a man living in what was then the Belgian Congo. This and other data demonstrate that HIV/AIDS existed in the Bas-Congo during the years that Meyers served in the region.

In 1973 Meyers and his family moved to Hawaii. He worked at the University of Hawaii as a professor of pathology for two years and became involved with the leprosy research on Molokai and also worked with leprosy patients, both on Oahu, at the Hale Mohalu Center in Pearl City, and on Molokai. While he was in Hawaii he was also able to spend some time organizing and analyzing the reports, documents, and tissue samples he had collected on leprosy patients from Africa and he used that knowledge to help his patients in Hawaii.

== Working with and for the Armed Forces Institute of Pathology ==
Meyers first visited the Armed Forces Institute of Pathology (AFIP) in 1961, before going to Africa. At that time, he met Daniel H. Connor, who was then planning to go to Uganda on a project which Chapman H. Binford (Chair of the Infectious Disease Department) and Robert E. Stowell (Scientific Director of the AFIP) had arranged. They had made a trip to Africa a year or so previously and had arranged collaborative projects with two academic institutions in Africa: one at Onderstepoort, in Gauteng, South Africa, near Pretoria; and the other one in Kampala, Uganda at Makerere University. Meyers visited Connor when he was in Burundi in 1962, and from that time on collaborated with the AFIP. Meyers worked through Binford, sending specimens and studying special patients. When Connor returned to the AFIP, their collaboration increased.

Meyers and his colleagues obtained a significant grant from the Research and Development Command of the U.S. Army, and conducted research in sleeping sickness, trypanosomiasis, and Buruli ulcer during about five of his eight years at this post in the Lower Congo. He worked in the Bas-Congo from 1965 until 1973.

At the time of independence, in 1960, the Belgians had trypanosomiasis pretty well under control in what had been the Belgian Congo. When Meyers began working in the Bas-Congo in 1965, it was uncommon to see a patient with active trypanosomiasis. By the time he left there in 1973, he and other physicians were seeing hundreds of cases annually of African-type sleeping sickness caused by trypanosomes in the hospital. They would come in spontaneously; there was no survey work being done.

Meyers joined the staff at the AFIP in 1975 after returning from Africa and Hawaii. At the institute he followed the AFIP mission of providing Education, Consultation, and Research. Meyers helped Binford with the AFIP's Registry of Leprosy, which has material from between 30,000 and 40,000 cases of leprosy. This is probably largest collection of pathologic materials from leprosy patients anywhere in the world. There was a lot of material on other mycobacterial diseases, such as Buruli ulcer, (Mycobacterium ulcerans infections) which is relatively unknown by the medical profession in the US, but it is a major problem in many foci in Africa and other places such as Australia.

In addition his work at the AFIP included work on the World Health Organization WHO Center for the Study of Filariasis developed in the Infectious Disease department primarily by Binford, and filarial diseases was one of the major collaborative efforts between Meyers, Ronald C. Neafie, and Aileen Marty.

Meyers retired from the AFIP in 2005 but continued as visiting scientist until the AFIP was closed 2011. He died in Maryland in September 2018 at the age of 94.

== Discoveries with Filarial Nematodes ==
Among the many patients that Meyers helped at the Leprosarium were some with diseases that mimicked leprosy. A series of patients had hypopigmented areas of the skin that resembled tuberculoid leprosy, but did not have the loss of sensation associated with leprosy lesions. Meyers biopsied these and through his collaborations with the AFIP discovered the adult form of Mansonella streptocerca.

== President of the International Leprosy Association ==
Meyers served as a chairman of the board of directors of American Leprosy Missions (ALM), Program Consultant to the ALM, and as a member of the ALM Board of Reference. He also served as Consultant to the Leonard Wood Memorial (American Leprosy Foundation). He was a member of the Corporate Board of the Damien-Dutton Society for Leprosy Aid. He served as a president of the International Leprosy Association, and also as president of the Binford-Dammin Society of Infectious Disease Pathologists.

== Work with Buruli Ulcer ==
In the early 1990s Meyers began to focus more of his work on Mycobacterium ulcerans, the third most common mycobacterial infection of immunocompetent people, following tuberculosis and leprosy. This tiny bacterium produces a toxin that causes deep, rapidly developing ulcers of the skin and destroys the subcutaneous fat. It is primarily seen in children and is often devastating. This illness is most commonly called Buruli ulcer. Surgery is usually required and often causes extensive sequels. The best technique to treat patients with this disease is excision way beyond the ulcerated areas followed by a graft procedure. In 1992 Meyers traveled with Marty to West Africa to establish relations with local physicians and government health officials to learn more about the extent of the disease in that part of the world while also there to gather data on leprosy in non-human primates. He then worked closely with a Belgian scientist, Professor Françoise Portaels to further understand the pathogenesis of this terrible infectious disease. Together they published 56 major medical investigations on Buruli ulcer which led to major advancements in the diagnosis and treatment of this devastating neglected disease. Meyers remained active as a scientist and physician even in his final year of life, the last article he worked on with Portaels involving Buruli ulcer was published in January 2018.
