= Mansonelliasis =

- Other names: Mansonellosis
- Specialty: Infectious diseases

Mansonelliasis is the condition of infection by the nematode Mansonella. The disease exists in Africa and tropical Americas, spread by biting midges or blackflies. It is usually asymptomatic.

== Symptoms and signs ==
Infections by Mansonella perstans, while often asymptomatic, can be associated with angioedema, pruritus, fever, headaches, arthralgias, and neurologic manifestations. Mansonella streptocerca can manifest on the skin via pruritus, papular eruptions and pigmentation changes. Mansonella ozzardi can cause symptoms that include arthralgias, headaches, fever, pulmonary symptoms, adenopathy, hepatomegaly, and pruritus. Eosinophilia is often prominent but do not occur in all cases of Mansonelliasis. M. perstans can also present with Calabar-like swellings, hives, and a condition known as Kampala, or Ugandan eye worm. This occurs when adult M. perstans invades the conjunctiva or periorbital connective tissues in the eye. M. perstans can also present with hydrocele in South America. However, it is often hard to distinguish between the symptoms of Mansonelliasis and other nematode infections endemic to the same areas.

== Causes ==
Mansonelliasis is caused by nematodes (roundworms) in the Mansonella genus that reside in the skin or certain body cavities. The specific species are M. perstans, M. streptocerca and M. ozzardi.

== Vectors and life cycle ==
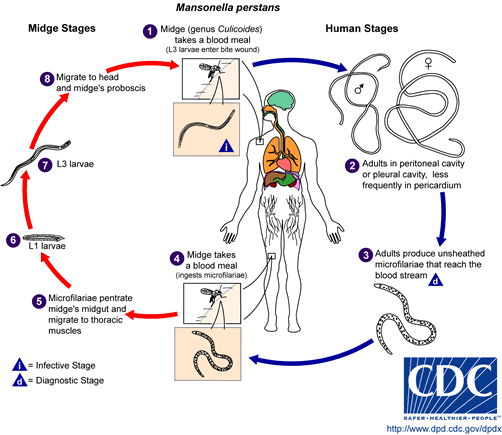
Life Cycles of Various Mansonella

During a blood meal, an infected midge (genus Culicoides) or blackfly (genus Simulium) introduces third-stage filarial larvae onto the skin of the human host, where they penetrate into the bite wound. They develop into adults that reside in body cavities, most commonly the peritoneal cavity or pleural cavity, but also occasionally in the pericardium (M. perstans), subcutaneous tissue (M. ozzardi) or dermis (M. steptocerca).

In M. perstans, size range for female worms is 70 to 80 mm long and 120 μm in diameter, and the males measure approximately 45 mm by 60 μm. In M. steptocerca, the females measure approximately 27 mm long. Their diameter is 50 μm at the level of the vulva (anteriorly) and ovaries (near the posterior end), and up to 85 μm at the mid-body. Males measure 50 μm in diameter. In M. ozzardi, adult worms are rarely found in humans. The size range for females worms is 65 to 81 mm long and 0.21 to 0.25 mm in diameter but unknown for males. Adult worms recovered from experimentally infected Patas monkeys measured 24 to 28 mm long and 70 to 80 μm in diameter (males) and 32 to 62 mm long and .130 to .160 mm in diameter (females).

Adults produce unsheathed and non-periodic (sub-periodic in M. perstans) microfilariae that reach the blood stream. A midge or black fly ingests microfilariae during a blood meal. After ingestion, the microfilariae migrate from the midgut through the hemocoel to the thoracic muscles of the arthropod. There the microfilariae develop into first-stage larvae and later into third-stage infective larvae. The third-stage infective larvae migrate to the arthropod’s proboscis where they can then infect another human when the midge or blackfly takes a blood meal. Asymptomatic humans serve as a significant reservoir for the disease. Little is known about other reservoirs of the disease.

== Pathogenesis ==
Mansonelliasis infection has been considered a minor filariasis, remaining asymptomatic in most infected subjects. Larvae develop in the subject and migrate to their respective regions in the skin or body cavities. It is likely that aside from being caused by the worm itself, some of the pathological changes observed are induced by the immune response to the infection leading to some of the various symptoms mentioned above. However, Mansonelliasis is little studied compared to other forms of filariasis so there is not as much information known regarding its specific pathogenesis.

== Diagnosis ==
Examination of blood samples will allow identification of microfilariae of M. perstans, and M. ozzardi based. This diagnosis can be made on the basis of the morphology of the nuclei distribution in the tails of the microfilariae. The blood sample can be a thick smear, stained with Giemsa or hematoxylin and eosin. For increased sensitivity, concentration techniques can be used. These include centrifugation of the blood sample lyzed in 2% formalin (Knott's technique), or filtration through a Nucleopore membrane.

Examination of skin snips will identify microfilariae of Onchocerca volvulus and M. streptocerca. Skin snips can be obtained using a corneal-scleral punch, or more simply a scalpel and needle. It is important that the sample be allowed to incubate for 30 minutes to 2 hours in saline or culture medium and then examined. This allows for the microfilariae that would have been in the tissue to migrate to the liquid phase of the specimen. Additionally, to differentiate the skin-dwelling filariae M. streptocerca and Onchocerca volvulus, a nested polymerase chain reaction (PCR) assay was developed using small amounts of parasite material present in skin biopsies.

== Prevention ==
Prevention can be partially achieved through limiting contact with vectors through the use of DEET and other repellents, but due to the predominantly relatively mild symptoms and the infection being generally asymptomatic, little has formally been done to control the disease.

== Treatment ==
There is no consensus on optimal therapeutic approach. The most commonly used drug is diethylcarbamazine (DEC), but it is, however, often ineffective. Although other drugs have been tried such as praziquantel, ivermectin, and albendozole, none has proven to be reliably and rapidly effective. Mebendazole appeared more active than DEC in eliminating the infection, and had comparable overall responses. Thiabendazole evidenced a small, but significant activity against the infection. A combination of treatments, DEC plus mebendazole, was much more effective than single drug doses.

== Epidemiology ==
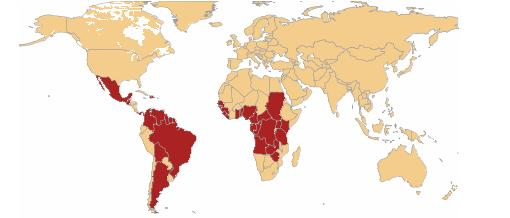
Areas where Mansonelliasis is endemic

Mansonelliasis is found in Latin America from the Yucatán peninsula to northern Argentina, in the Caribbean, and in Africa from Senegal to Kenya and south to Angola and Zimbabwe. M. ozzardi is found only in the New World, M. steptocerca is found only in the Congo Basin, and M. perstans is found in both the previously described areas of Africa and Latin America. Prevalence rates vary from a few percent to as much as 90% in areas like Trinidad, Guyana and Colombia.

Infection is more common and has a higher microfilarial dose with age, though studies have found microfilarial dose not to be correlated with symptoms. In parts of rural South America, men have been found more susceptible than women, possibly due to more outdoors work by males as children, and possibly due to cooking fires serving as deterrents to vectors for women who perform more domestic duties. One study in central Africa found M. perstans to be a much more common cause of filariasis symptoms compared to Loa loa and Wuchereria bancrofti.

Since most Mansonelliasis is asymptomatic, it has been considered a relatively minor filarial disease, and has a very low, if any, mortality, though there is little data on which to base estimates.

== History ==
Mansonelliasis, in the form of M. ozzardi, was first documented in 1897.

== See also ==
- Filariasis
- Mansonella
