= Feline asthma =

Cat allergy

Feline asthma is a common allergic respiratory disease in cats, affecting at least one percent of all adult cats worldwide. It is a chronic progressive disease for which there is no cure. Common symptoms include wheezing, coughing, labored breathing and potentially life-threatening bronchoconstriction. There is conjecture that the disease has become more common due to increased exposure to industrial pollutants. Feline asthma can also be attributed to lung damage caused by long-term exposure to second-hand smoke.

== Signs and symptoms ==
An adult cat having a coughing fit

Feline asthma occurs with the inflammation of the small passageways of a cat's lungs. During the attack the lungs will thicken and constrict, making it difficult for the cat to breathe. Mucus may be released by the lungs into the airway, resulting in fits of coughing and wheezing. Some cats experience a less severe version of an asthma attack and only endure some slight coughing. The obvious signs that a cat is having a respiratory attack are: coughing, wheezing, blue lips and gums, squatting with shoulders hunched and neck extended, rapid open mouth breathing or gasping for air, gagging up foamy mucus, and overall weakness.

== Diagnosis ==
Owners often notice their cat coughing several times per day. Cat coughing sounds different from human coughing, usually sounding more like the cat is passing a hairball. Veterinarians will classify the severity of feline asthma based on the medical signs. There are a number of diseases that are very closely related to feline asthma which must be ruled out before asthma can be diagnosed. Lungworms, heartworms, upper and lower respiratory infections, lung cancer, cardiomyopathy and lymphocytic plasmacytic stomatitis all mimic asthmatic symptoms. Medical signs, pulmonary radiographs, and a positive response to steroids help confirm the diagnosis.

While radiographs can be helpful for diagnosis, airway sampling through transtracheal wash or bronchoalveolar lavage is often necessary. More recently, computed tomography has been found to be more readily available and accurate in distinguishing feline tracheobronchitis from bronchopneumonia.

== Treatment ==
Although feline asthma is incurable, ongoing treatments allow many domestic cats to live normal lives. Feline asthma is commonly managed through use of bronchodilators for mild cases, or glucocorticosteroids with bronchodilators for moderate to severe cases.

Previously, standard veterinary practice recommended injected and oral medications for control of the disease. These drugs may have systemic side effects including diabetes and pancreatitis. In 2000, Dr. Philip Padrid pioneered inhaled medications using a pediatric chamber and mask using fluticasone and salbutamol. Inhaled treatments reduce or eliminate systemic effects. In 2003 a chamber called the AeroKat Feline Aerosol Chamber was designed specifically for cats, significantly improving efficiency and reducing cost for the caregiver. Medicine can also be administered using a human baby spacer device. Inhaled steroid usually takes 10–14 days to reach an effective dose.

== Prevention ==
Feline asthma and other respiratory diseases may be prevented by cat owners by eliminating as many allergens as possible. Allergens that can be found in a cat's habitual environment include: pollen, molds, dust from cat litter, perfumes, room fresheners, carpet deodorizers, hairspray, aerosol cleaners, cigarette smoke, and some foods. Avoid using cat litters that create excessive dust, scented cat litters or litter additives. Of course eliminating all of these can be difficult and unnecessary, especially since a cat is only affected by one or two. It can be very challenging to find the allergen that is creating asthmatic symptoms in a particular cat and requires a lot of work on both the owner's and the veterinarian's part. But just like any disease, the severity of an asthma attack can be propelled by more than just the allergens, common factors include: obesity, stress, parasites and pre-existing heart conditions. Dry air encourages asthma attacks so a humidifier, especially during winter months, is advised.

== Risk factors ==
Studies show that cats between the ages of two and eight years have the greatest risk of developing a respiratory disease. Siamese and Himalayan breeds and breed mixes seem to be most prone to asthma. Some studies also indicate that more female cats seem to be affected by asthma than male cats.

== See also ==
- Asthma
- Winn Feline Foundation
