= Dirofilariasis =

Human disease transmitted by mosquitoes

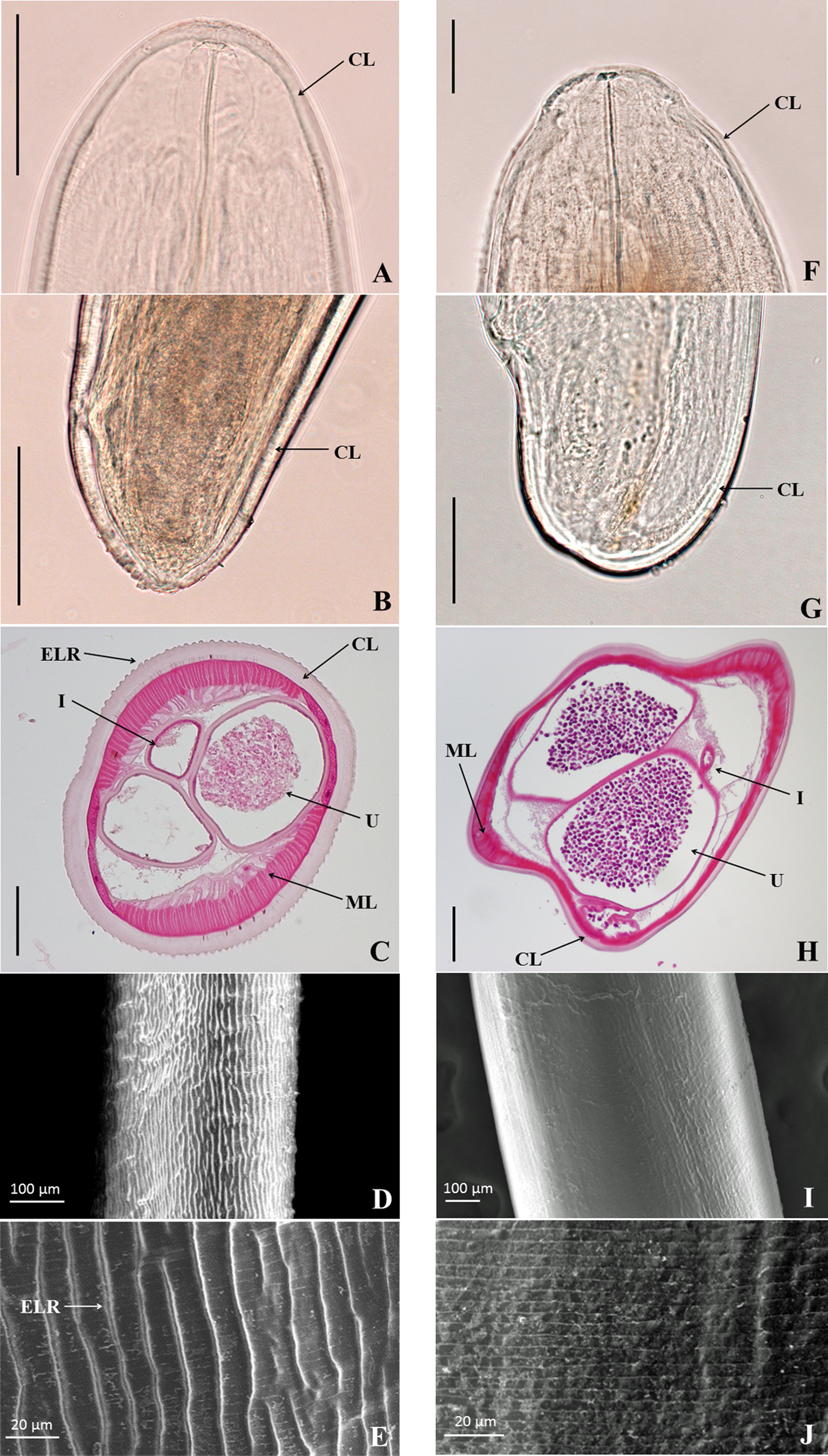
- Comparison of probable Dirofilaria repens (left) and Dirofilaria immitis (right)
- Specialty: Infectious diseases

Dirofilariasis is an infection by parasites of the genus Dirofilaria. It is transmitted through a mosquito bite; its main hosts include dogs and wild canids. These can give rise to granulomas in the pulmonary artery. Some common symptoms include cough, fever and pleural effusion. It may also appear on X-rays of the chest.

== Causes ==
Dirofilariasis is caused by the bites of mosquitoes. The adult worms produce microfilariae in the circulation, which are ingested by mosquitoes when they bite an infected animal. Inside the mosquito, the microfilariae develop into infective larvae. When the mosquito bites another animal, these larvae migrate to the bite site and develop into adult heartworms in the heart and pulmonary arteries.

== Diagnosis ==
Dirofilariasis is often diagnosed by the examination of tissue obtained as part of the diagnostic investigation of coin lesions. Blood tests are not yet helpful in the diagnosis of dirofilariasis in humans.

== Treatment ==
Treatment with tetracycline antibiotics has been reported to damage Dirofilaria immitis, often causing death of adult worms.
