= Melarsomine =

Chemical compound

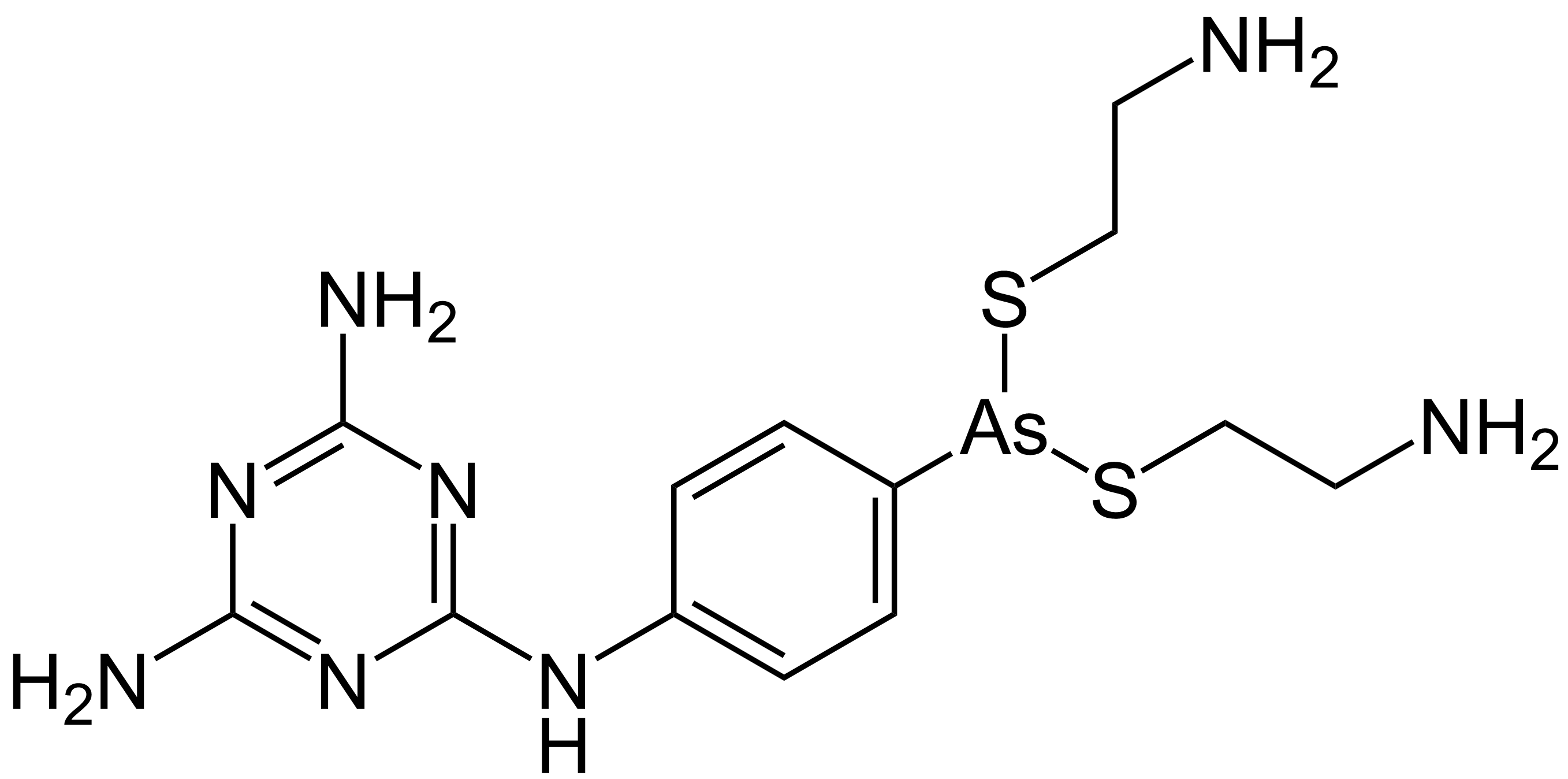

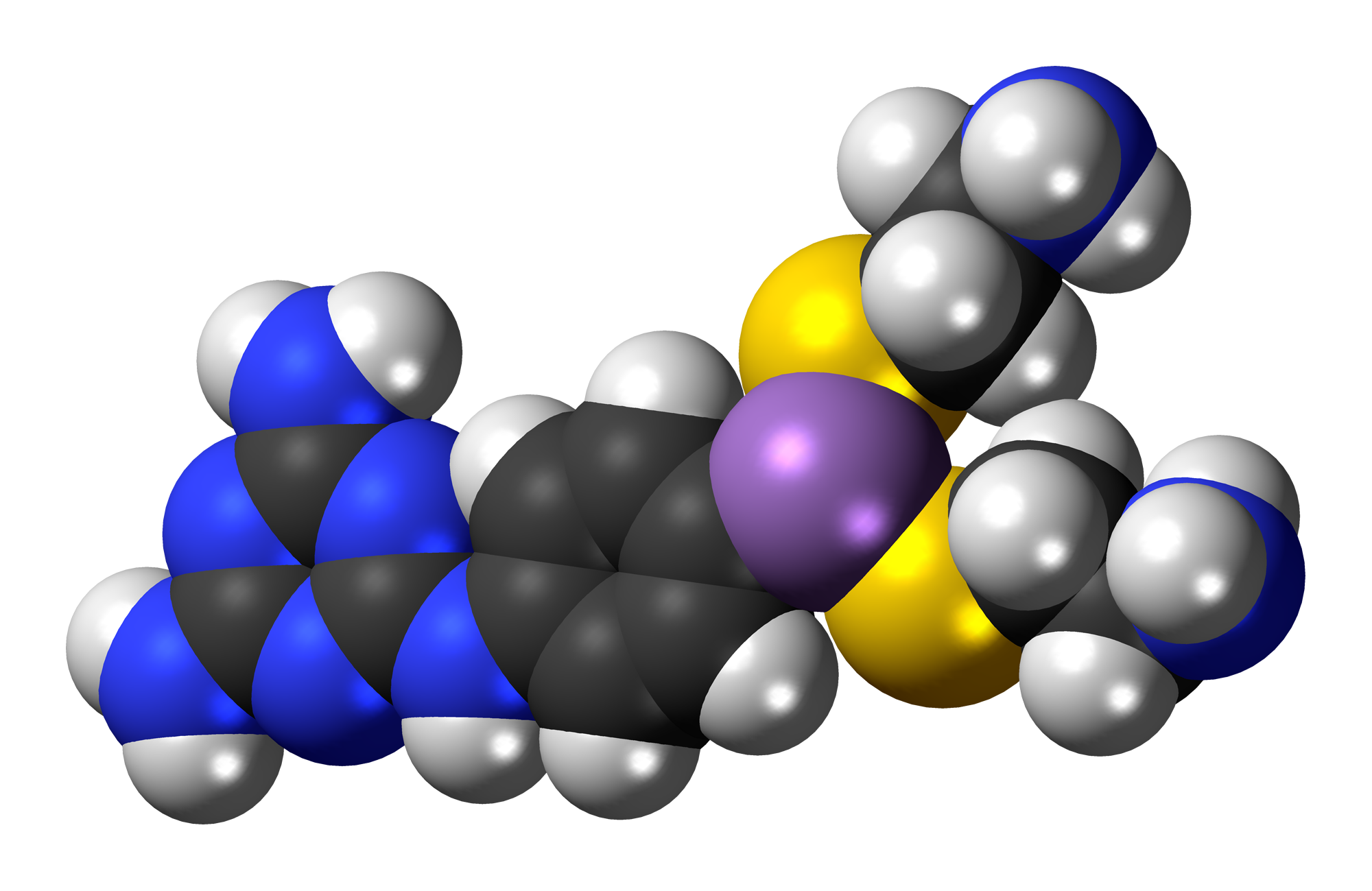

Clinical data
- Trade names: Immiticide, Diroban
- AHFS/Drugs.com: International Drug Names
- ATC code: none

Identifiers
- IUPAC name: Bis(2-aminoethyl) {4-[(4,6-diamino-1,3,5-triazin-2-yl)amino]phenyl}arsonodithioite
- CAS Number: 128470-15-5
- PubChem CID: 65962
- ChemSpider: 59365
- UNII: 374GJ0S41A
- KEGG: D08168
- CompTox Dashboard (EPA): DTXSID40155907

Chemical and physical data
- Formula: C_{13}H_{21}AsN_{8}S_{2}
- Molar mass: 428.41 g·mol^{−1}
- 3D model (JSmol): Interactive image
- SMILES: C1=CC(=CC=C1NC2=NC(=NC(=N2)N)N)[As](SCCN)SCCN
- InChI: InChI=1S/C13H21AsN8S2/c15-5-7-23-14(24-8-6-16)9-1-3-10(4-2-9)19-13-21-11(17)20-12(18)22-13/h1-4H,5-8,15-16H2,(H5,17,18,19,20,21,22); Key:MGEOLZFMLHYCFZ-UHFFFAOYSA-N

Melarsomine (melaminylthioarsenate) is an arsenic-based anthelmintic. In the U.S., it is marketed under the trade names Immiticide (Merial) and Diroban (Zoetis), and is approved by the FDA's Center for Veterinary Medicine for the treatment of adult heartworm (Dirofilaria immitis) infection in dogs. It is not approved for treatment in cats, or dogs in late-stage infection.
