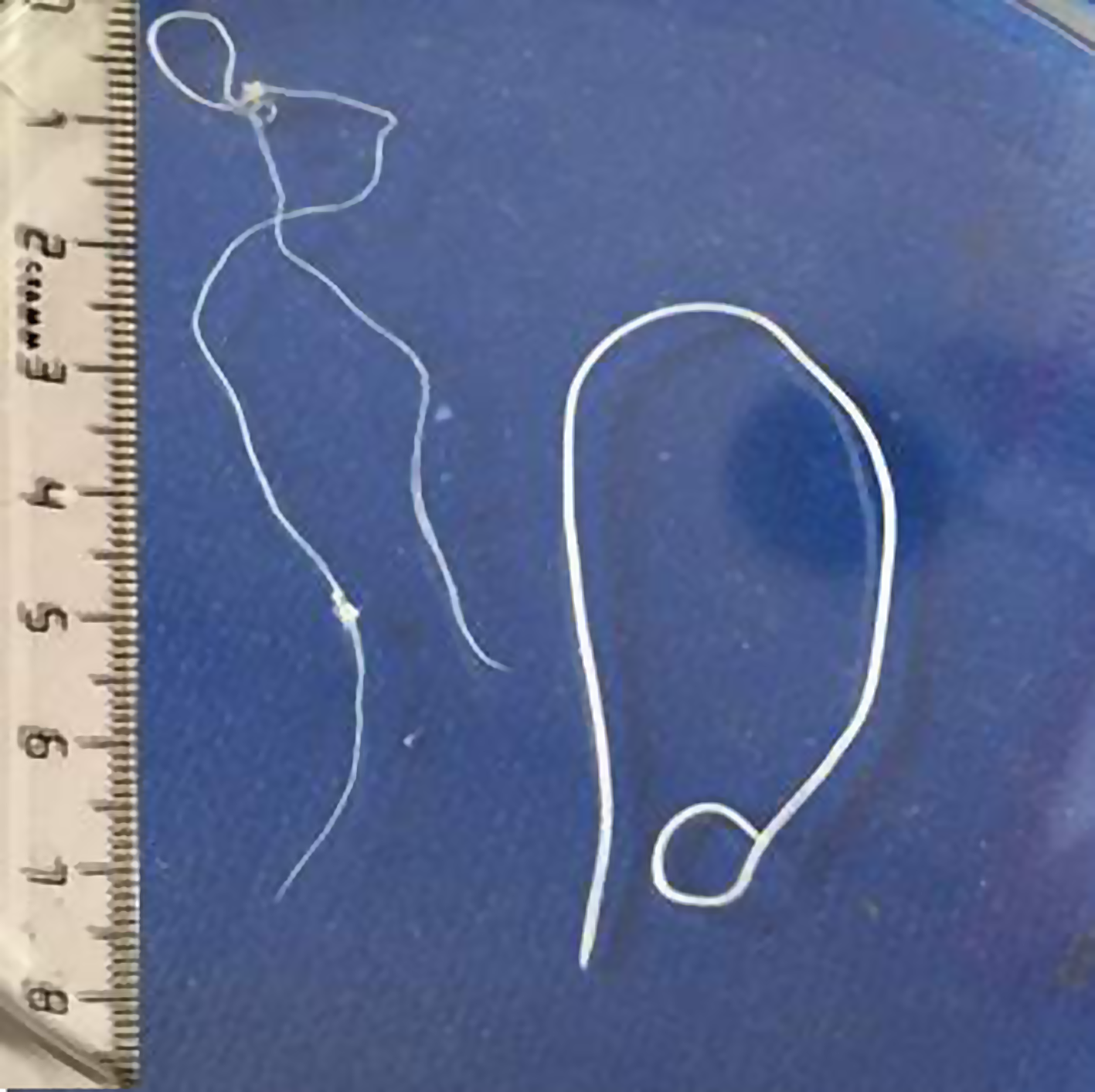
- Dirofilaria immitis (left) and Dirofilaria repens (right)

Scientific classification
- Kingdom: Animalia
- Phylum: Nematoda
- Class: Chromadorea
- Order: Rhabditida
- Family: Onchocercidae
- Genus: Dirofilaria; Railliet & Henry, 1911

Species
- Dirofilaria immitis; Dirofilaria repens; Dirofilaria ursi

= Dirofilaria =

Genus of worms

Dirofilaria is an arthropod-borne filarial nematode (roundworm), in the family Onchocercidae. Some species cause dirofilariasis, a state of parasitic infection, in humans and other animals.

There are about 27 species in the genus. These are generally divided into two subgenera, Dirofilaria and Nochtiella.

Some species are well-known parasites, including Dirofilaria immitis, the dog heartworm, Dirofilaria repens, which affects many types of nonhuman mammals, and Dirofilaria tenuis, which usually parasitizes raccoons, but can infect humans, as well.

Human dirofilariasis is generally caused by D. immitis and D. repens. The former can cause pulmonary dirofilariasis, which may have no symptoms. Another form of the infection can be characterized by a painful lump under the skin or infection of the eye. The nematodes are spread by mosquitoes.

== Etymology ==
From Latin dīrus 'fearful; ominous' + fīlum 'thread', Dirofilaria is a genus of nematodes of the superfamily Filarioidea. The first known description of Dirofilaria may have been by Italian nobleman Francesco Birago in 1626 in his Treatise on Hunting: “The dog generates two worms, which are half an arm’s length long and thicker than a finger and red like fire.” Birago erroneously identified the worms as a larval stage of another parasite, Dioctophyme renale. The dog heartworm was named Filaria by American parasitologist Joseph Leidy in 1856, and the genus was renamed Dirofilaria by French parasitologists Railliet and Henry in 1911.

== Taxonomy ==
Species in the genus include:

- Dirofilaria acutiuscula
- Dirofilaria aethiops
- Dirofilaria ailure
- Dirofilaria asymmetrica
- Dirofilaria cancrivori
- Dirofilaria conjunctivae
- Dirofilaria corynodes
- Dirofilaria desportesi
- Dirofilaria fausti
- Dirofilaria freitasi
- Dirofilaria genettae
- Dirofilaria hystrix
- Dirofilaria immitis – dog heartworm
- Dirofilaria indica
- Dirofilaria louisianensis
- Dirofilaria macacae
- Dirofilaria macrodemos
- Dirofilaria magalhaesi
- Dirofilaria magnilarvata
- Dirofilaria pongoi
- Dirofilaria reconditum
- Dirofilaria repens
- Dirofilaria roemeri
- Dirofilaria tawila
- Dirofilaria tenuis
- Dirofilaria timidi
- Dirofilaria uniformis
- Dirofilaria ursi
