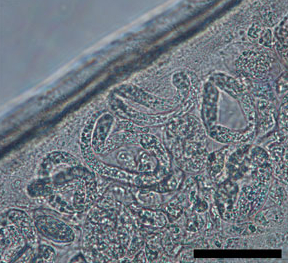

Scientific classification
- Kingdom: Animalia
- Phylum: Nematoda
- Class: Chromadorea
- Order: Rhabditida
- Family: Onchocercidae
- Genus: Dirofilaria
- Species: D. repens

Binomial name
- Dirofilaria repens Railliet & Henry 1911

= Dirofilaria repens =

Species of roundworm

Dirofilaria repens is a filarial nematode that affects dogs and other carnivores such as cats, wolves, coyotes, foxes, and sea lions, as well as muskrats. It is transmitted by mosquitoes.

== Epidemiology ==
It is most often found in the Mediterranean region, sub-Saharan Africa, and Eastern Europe. Italy bears the highest burden of European dirofilariasis cases in humans: (66%), followed by France (22%), Greece (8%), and Spain (4%). In Europe, the parasite has spread as far north as Estonia.

== Lifecycle ==
The lifecycle of D. repens consists of five larval stages in a vertebral host and an arthropod (mosquito) intermediate host and vector. In the first stage, mated adult female worms produce thousands of microfilariae (larvae) into the circulation daily, which are ingested by mosquitoes in a blood meal. Larvae develop into infective larvae within the mosquito over the next 10–16 days, depending on environmental conditions, before being reintroduced back into a new host. Microfilariae undergo secondary developmental changes in the insect. For the final two stages of development, third-stage larvae are inoculated back into a vertebral host during an act of feeding. The adults of D. repens reside in the subcutaneous tissues of dogs and cats, where they mature in 6–7 months. Adult worms are 1–2 mm in diameter (females are 25–30 cm in length, the males being shorter).

Humans are accidental hosts because adult worms cannot reach maturity in the heart or in the skin. Most infective larvae introduced into humans are thought to die; therefore, infected individuals usually are not microfilaremic. Human disease is amicrofilaremic.

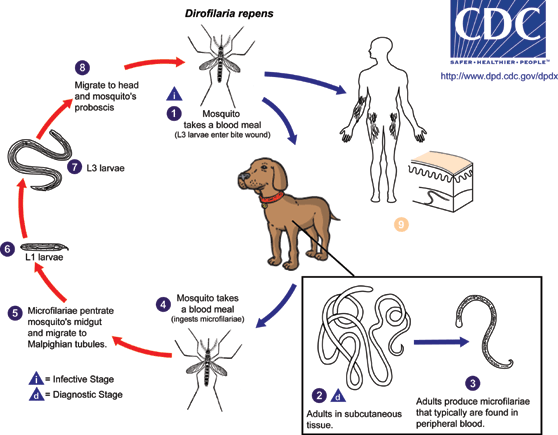

== Infections in humans ==
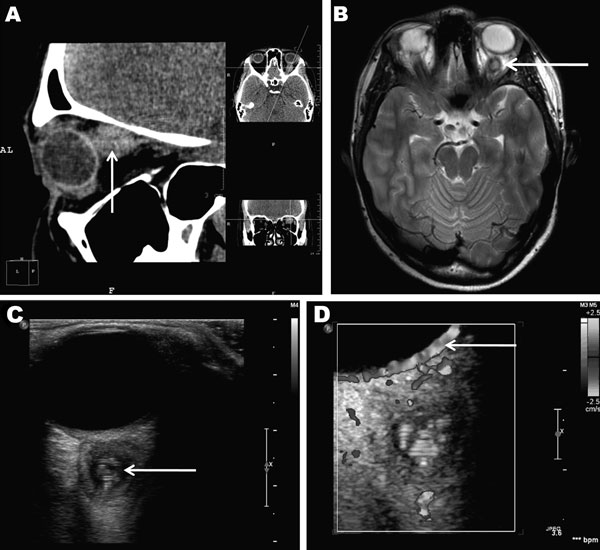
Retro-ocular nodule of a D. repens worm detected in a 20-year-old woman, Rostov-na-Donu, Russia: The cyst (arrows) is shown by computed tomography scan (A) and magnetic resonance imaging (B). Ultrasonography image (C) shows a worm-like structure inside the cyst (arrow), and color Doppler imaging (D) shows marginal vascularization of the lesion).

Infections in humans usually manifest as a single subcutaneous nodule, which is caused by a macrofilaria that is trapped by the immune system. Subcutaneous migration of the worm may result in local swellings with changing localization. In addition, rare cases of organ manifestation have been reported, affecting the lung, male genitals, female breast, or the eye. The latter is found in particular during the migratory phase of the parasite. D. repens occurs more commonly in adults (aged 40–49 years). The only exception is in Sri Lanka, where children younger than nine years are most likely to be infected. The youngest individual reported was aged four months.

== Diagnosis ==
Final diagnosis is established by microscopic examination of the excised worm. Making a definite species diagnosis on morphologic grounds is difficult, because a large number of zoonotic Dirofilaria species have been described that share morphologic features with D. repens.

== Treatment ==
Antifilarial medication for infected humans generally is not supported in the medical literature. One group of authors has recommended a single dose of ivermectin followed by three doses of diethylcarbamazine if the syndrome is recognized prior to surgery. However, most cases are diagnosed retrospectively, when histopathological sections of biopsy or excision material are viewed. In terms of surgical care, excision of lesions and affected areas is the treatment of choice for patients with human dirofilariasis. Some authors have recommended a period of observing chest coin lesions for several months if dirofilariasis is suspected and no other features in the history or examination suggesting malignancy or other infection are present. Also, no specific diet is recommended for patients with dirofilariasis.
