= Arsenamide =

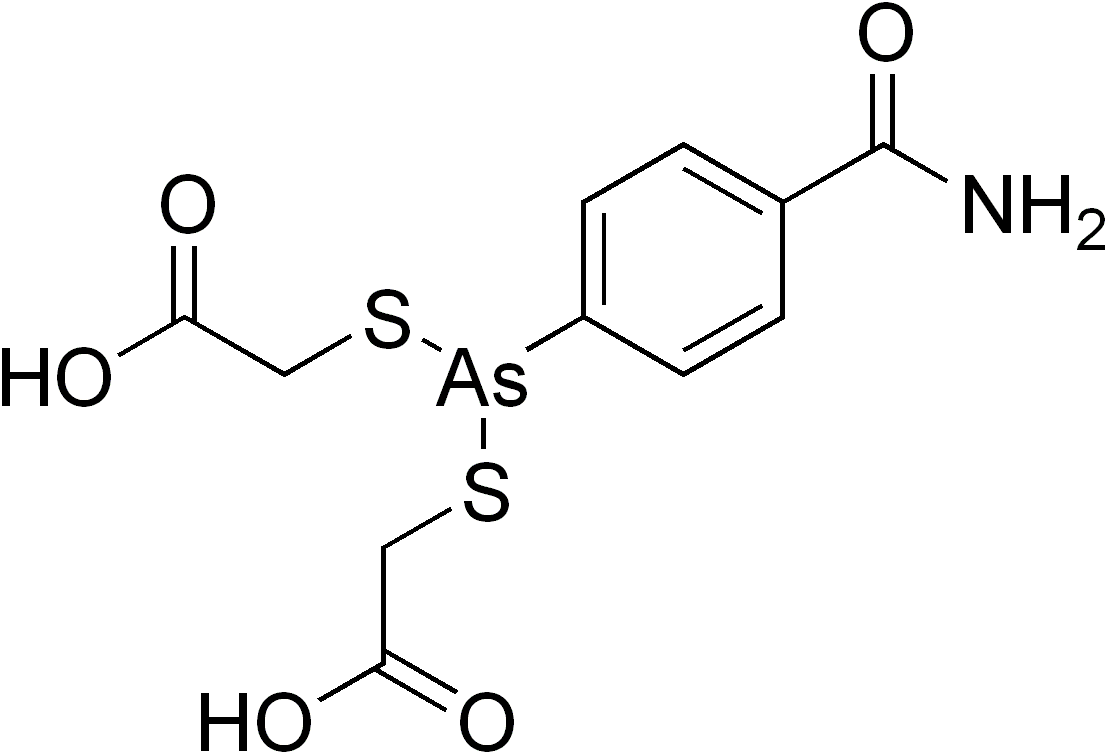

Names
- Preferred IUPAC name 2,2′-{[(4-Carbamoylphenyl)arsanediyl]bis(sulfanediyl)}diacetic acid
- Other names Thiacetarsamide

Identifiers
CAS Number	531-72-6
3D model (JSmol)	Interactive image
ChemSpider	10296
PubChem CID	10749
UNII	VMF4ELY9TZ
CompTox Dashboard (EPA)	DTXSID10201182
- InChI: InChI=1S/C11H12AsNO5S2/c13-11(18)7-1-3-8(4-2-7)12(19-5-9(14)15)20-6-10(16)17/h1-4H,5-6H2,(H2,13,18)(H,14,15)(H,16,17) Key: YBQWEUNEYYXYOI-UHFFFAOYSA-N; InChI=1/C11H12AsNO5S2/c13-11(18)7-1-3-8(4-2-7)12(19-5-9(14)15)20-6-10(16)17/h1-4H,5-6H2,(H2,13,18)(H,14,15)(H,16,17) Key: YBQWEUNEYYXYOI-UHFFFAOYAK
- SMILES: O=C(N)c1ccc(cc1)[As](SCC(=O)O)SCC(=O)O

Properties
Chemical formula	C_{11}H_{12}AsNO_{5}S_{2}
Molar mass	377.27 g/mol
- Except where otherwise noted, data are given for materials in their standard state (at 25 °C [77 °F], 100 kPa). verify (what is ?) Infobox references

Arsenamide or thiacetarsamide (trade name Caparsolate) is an arsenical. It is a proposed chemotherapeutic agent against canine filaria and trichomonas.
