= Dirofilaria tenuis =

Scientific classification
- Domain: Eukaryota
- Kingdom: Animalia
- Phylum: Nematoda
- Class: Chromadorea
- Order: Rhabditida
- Family: Onchocercidae
- Genus: Dirofilaria
- Species: D. tenuis

Binomial name
- Dirofilaria tenuis Chandler, 1942

Species of roundworm

Dirofilaria tenuis is a species of nematode, a parasitic roundworm that infects the subcutaneous tissue of vertebrates. D. tenuis most commonly infects raccoons, but some human cases have been reported. They are vectored by mosquitoes and follow similar development and transmission patterns as other Dirofilaria.

== Morphology ==
Adults of D. tenuis are long and thin with a pointed anterior end. The posterior end is long, drawn out, and typically remains coiled. It possesses a hook and may have up to fifteen pairs of sensory organs known as papillae covering the posterior region of the body. Females vary in length, from 8–13 cm, averaging about 9 cm, while males are 4–4.8 cm in length, averaging 4.5 cm. D. tenuis possess eight papillae in addition to two amphids around the mouth opening. The mouth leads to a short esophagus, which is connected to the intestine and leads to the excretory opening. D. tenuis also possesses a nerve cord at the anterior end of the body cavity and differentiated reproductive organs. The outermost surface of the cuticle, or outer covering of the worm, is covered in small lines running transversely and more prominent ridges arranged longitudinally. These ridges are less prominent at the head and anal ends. The combination of the transverse lines and longitudinal ridges can give D. tenuis a beaded appearance.

== Life cycle ==
Dirofilaria tenuis is introduced to the host (either a raccoon or, as in some rare cases, a human) as a larva when the vector, most commonly an Aedes or Anopheles mosquito, takes a blood meal and the parasite enters the host through the bite wound. Once inside the host, the larva molts into its final larval stage and then into an adult. As an adult it resides in the subcutaneous tissue of the host. These adults are able to live up to ten years within the tissue of the host. The female is able to reproduce throughout her entire adult life and her eggs and microfilariae enter the peripheral blood stream of the host. They are then ingested by the vector mosquitoes during a blood meal and travel to the malphigian tubules of the mosquito. There, they undergo development, from microfilaria, to first, second, and finally third stage larvae. This typically spans a length of 10–12 days. Following the third larval stage, at which point they have become infective, they travel back to the proboscis of the mosquito via the haemocoel and enter another definitive host. If the mosquito is highly infected, multiple larvae can be transmitted in one blood meal. Humans are a dead-end host for D. tenuis; after the larva molts into an adult, it cannot reproduce. The worm may live subcutaneously for several months before it dies.

== Pathology and treatment ==
Dirofilaria tenuis is frequently found in the southeastern part of the United States and is most commonly a parasite of raccoons, but some human cases have been reported. Although there are multiple species of mosquitoes that can become infected with and possibly vector the nematode, Anopheles quadrimaculatus and Aedes taeniohynchus have proven to be the most effective and most common host species. There does not seem to be an overwhelming effect on the definitive host, the raccoon, that would cause significant health issues. The only apparent disturbances to the host are the small nodules that form as an inflammatory response at the surface of the skin when one of the worms dies. Most research suggests that the parasite and the host are compatible and able to coexist over a time period of many years.

Dirofilaria tenuis is not compatible with a human host, so it dies much more quickly, living only a few months. During this time, a lump or nodule will form where the worm is located. This most commonly occurs near the site of the mosquito bite, but can also be much farther away. D. tenuis may migrate using the host's blood, leaving the worm anywhere in the body, even the conjunctiva of the eye. As the body attempts to clear the worm, the nodule may become painful. If the patient continues to experience discomfort, the worm may be surgically excised. Excision is a curative treatment and the worm is diagnosed as D. tenuis easily using its unique morphology.
