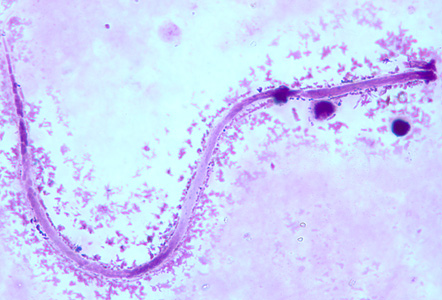
- M. ozzardi

Scientific classification
- Kingdom: Animalia
- Phylum: Nematoda
- Class: Chromadorea
- Order: Rhabditida
- Family: Onchocercidae
- Genus: Mansonella; Faust, 1929

Species
- 9 species (see text)
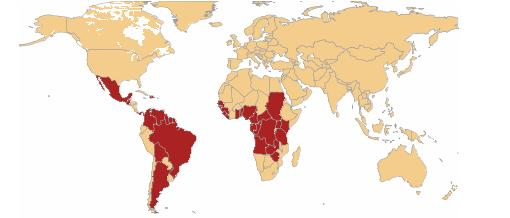
- Endemic areas

Synonyms
- Cutifilaria Bain & Schulz-Key, 1974; Esslingeria Chabaud & Bain, 1976; Parlitomosa Nagaty, 1935; Sandnema Chabaud & Bain, 1976; Tetrapetalonema Faust, 1935; Tupainema Eberhard & Orihel, 1984

= Mansonella =

Genus of roundworms

Mansonella is a genus of parasitic nematodes. It includes three species that are responsible for the disease mansonelliasis: Mansonella ozzardi, M. perstans, and M. streptocerca. Whole-genome sequences from Mansonella perstans, Mansonella ozzardi, and the newly proposed species Mansonella sp. "DEUX" have been assembled.

== Species ==
There are nine accepted species

- Mansonella barbascalensis
- Mansonella llewellyni Price, 1962
- Mansonella longicapitata Eberhard, Campo-Aasen & Orihel, 1984
- Mansonella ozzardi Manson, 1897 – parasite of humans in Central and South America
- Mansonella perstans Manson, 1891 – parasite of humans and primates in Africa and South America
- Mansonella rodhaini
- Mansonella rotundicapitata Eberhard, Campo-Aasen & Orihel, 1984
- Mansonella semiclarum Fain, 1974
- Mansonella streptocerca – parasite of humans in West and Central Africa
