= Mansonella ozzardi =

Scientific classification
- Kingdom: Animalia
- Phylum: Nematoda
- Class: Chromadorea
- Order: Rhabditida
- Family: Onchocercidae
- Genus: Mansonella
- Species: M. ozzardi

Binomial name
- Mansonella ozzardi Manson, 1897

Species of roundworm

Mansonella ozzardi is a filarial (arthropod-borne) nematode (roundworm). This filarial nematode is one of two that causes serous cavity filariasis in humans. The other filarial nematode that causes it in humans is Mansonella perstans. M. ozzardi is an endoparasite that inhabits the serous cavity of the abdomen in the human host. It lives within the mesenteries, peritoneum, and in the subcutaneous tissue.

== Morphology ==
Like other nematodes, M. ozzardi is a cylindrical and bilaterally symmetrical worm, with a pseudocoel, or a false body cavity. The exterior of the parasite, the cuticle, is a protective layer that can withstand the harsh environment in the digestive tracts of the human hosts.

Mansonella ozzardi and other nematodes have longitudinal muscles that run along the body wall. They also have dorsal, ventral, and longitudinal nerve cords connected to these longitudinal muscles.

In the adult stages of M. ozzardi, the females are larger than the males.

Mansonella ozzardi is usually smaller than those Onchocerca Volvulus (that causes human onchocerciasis) when both species co-exist; especially in some rural areas in Brazil, within the Amazonian onchocerciasis focus.

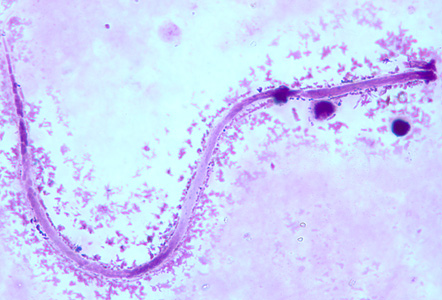
M. ozzardi microfilariae from a thick blood smear: The sample was stained with Giemsa solution for easier visualization under the microscope.

== Reproduction ==
This is a dioecious species; the female is believed to release a pheromone to attract males. When the male finds the female, he will coil around the female over the genital pore. The male's spicules are used to hold the female during copulation. The females are ovoviviparous. The sperm of a nematode lacks a flagellum. Its motility is due to its amoeboid-type cell.

== Geographic range ==
This is a New World parasite. It is prominent in the subtropical, tropical, and temperate regions of Central and South America (Mexico, Panama, Brazil, Colombia, and Argentina), and the Caribbean. The prevalence of M. ozzardi in Brazil is very high; about 44–52% of Brazilian farmers are infected. It is also prevalent with the American Indian population. Many transmission hotspots in the Amazon Basin map to indigenous communities. Endemicity levels vary widely among rural villages, situated a few kilometers apart along the same rivers in the western Amazon Basin of Brazil.

== Lifecycle ==
1. An arthropod (black fly or biting midge) will take a blood meal from a human and will insert its third-stage filarial larvae into the human host.
2. The larvae will then become adults and will inhabit the peritoneal spaces and adjacent locations.
3. The adults will mate and produce unsheathed microfilariae. These microfilariae will go to the bloodstream.
4. An arthropod will take a blood meal from an infected human and ingest the microfilariae.
5. In the arthropod, the microfilariae will travel from the midgut to the thoracic muscles.
6. In the thoracic muscles, the microfilariae will develop into the first-stage larvae.
7. Later, the microfilariae will further develop into the third-stage larvae.
8. The third-stage larvae will travel from the thoracic muscles to the arthropod's proboscis. This is the stage where the arthropod can infect a human when it takes a blood meal.

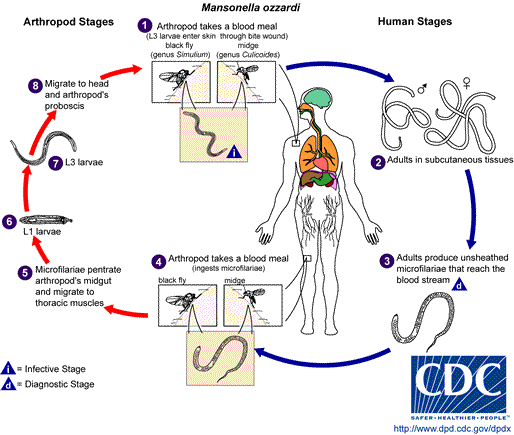

== Transmission ==
Mansonella ozzardi is transmitted by two types of arthropods that feed on the blood of humans: biting midges (genus Culicoides) and blackflies (genus Simulium). In the Caribbean, M. ozzardi uses the biting midge as its intermediate host. The black fly serves as the intermediate host for the filariae parasite in the Amazon Basin and mainland South America.

=== Biting midge ===
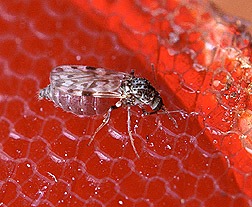
Biting midge

The biting midges are small flies that breed on sandy beaches near the sea. Some species also lay their eggs on decaying leaf litter, humus, manure, and partially rotten vegetation, in tree holes, and the cut stumps of banana trees. They feed on the blood of mammals, birds, reptiles, and humans. Their short mouthparts prohibit them from biting through clothing. As a result, they prefer to feed on the head or other exposed body parts. Blood meals occur throughout the day and night, but biting activity peaks during the early evening. Since individual bites can be painful, they are a cause of concern because they tend to attack in swarms of hundreds or thousands. Due to their small size, they can pass through mesh mosquito nets.

=== Black fly ===
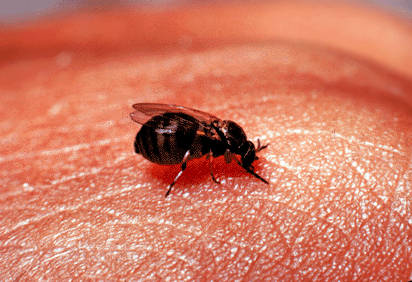
Black fly

The blackflies are larger blood-sucking flies that breed in fast-flowing streams and rivers. Their larvae can be found attached to submerged vegetation and stones of infected waterways. Blood meals occur during the day in the outdoors, especially along riverbeds. After a meal, the flies rest for 2–3 days on trees and other vegetation to digest the blood. Like the biting midges, blackflies attack their victims in swarms and their bites are painful. The bites may cause swelling, inflammation, and irritation that may last for weeks.

== Pathology ==
=== Symptoms ===
The pathogenicity of M. ozzardi needs further research. Although the adult worms live in the body cavities and the mesentery, they do cause clinical manifestations to their human hosts.

1. Moderate fever
2. Coldness in the legs
3. Joint pains, like articular pain or arthralgias
4. Headaches
5. Pruritus (itchiness)
6. Skin eruptions
7. Pulmonary symptoms
8. Lymphadenitis - inflammation of the lymph nodes
9. Adenopathy - enlargement of the lymph nodes
10. Hepatomegaly - enlargement of the liver
11. Calabar like swellings that radiate out from core [10]

Mansonella ozzardi is also considered as a possible cause for corneal lesions. Even though there is no significant evidence for it, but in certain regions in Central and South America where both M. ozzardi and O. volvulus co-occur, skin biopsies have always showed that onchoserciasis is the cause for corneal lesions.

=== Diagnosis ===
Microscopic examination is the most practical diagnostic tool used to identify the M. ozzardi microfilariae in blood samples from infected patients. Blood smears are usually stained with haematoxylin or Giemsa to visualize the worms under the microscope.

Real-time polymerase chain reaction (PCR) assays can detect and quantify M. ozzardi microfilariae, particularly within research environments, while loop-mediated isothermal amplification (LAMP) assays have been developed for field use. PCR and LAMP methods improve diagnostic sensitivity and specificity.

Diagnosticians must not rely entirely on blood samples, since microfilariae have also been detected in the skin. The "filarial dance sign" is a specific ultrasonographic finding characterized by the visualization of live, motile adult or larval filarial nematodes within the affected tissues of a host, most commonly observed in the breast, spermatic cord, scrotum, axillary lymphatics, and limbs.

=== Treatment ===
Ivermectin is the treatment of choice for M. ozzardi infections. It is a potent macrocyclic lactone that binds to chloride channels, which then open and allow chloride ions to enter the affected cells. These cells hyperpolarize, resulting in muscle paralysis in the M. ozzardi microfilariae. This allows host immune cells to adhere to the microfilariae surface and facilitate their elimination. Ivermectin is unable to kill the adult worms.

Several studies have found treatment of M. ozzardi with doxycycline appears to cure the infection by targeting the obligate mutualistic endosymbiotic bacteria of the Wolbachia genus that are essential for the nematode's development and survival. Wolbachia bacteria endosymbionts are intracellular, gram-negative bacteria that maintain a mutualistic relationship with M. ozzardi, and the nematode is unable to reproduce or complete its life cycle without them. By killing the Wolbachia bacteria through a 4–6 week course of treatment, doxycycline indirectly sterilizes and kills the adult M. ozzardi, curing the infection.

Diethylcarbamazine (DEC) also has been used in treating filarial infections. While DEC works well against many filarial parasites, it is not effective in treating M. ozzardi microfilarial infections.

== Disease control ==
Aside from ivermectin, preventive measures can be taken by individuals living in areas endemic to M. ozzardi. Since biting midges cannot bite through clothing, those living in the Caribbean should wear long-sleeved shirts and pants to decrease the body parts exposed. Insect repellents could also be used to cover body parts not protected by clothing. Communities should also maintain the natural vegetation around them to decrease the possible breeding grounds for the biting midges.

In South America, the best way to control the population of blackflies, and the transmission of M. ozzardi, is to apply insecticides specific for blackfly larvae to streams and rivers. Application of insecticide to a specific breeding site also kills larvae in breeding sites up to 10 km downstream. Extensive networks of waterways must be treated with insecticide since blackflies have the ability to fly with the wind for several hundreds of kilometers. Individuals should also avoid the waterways whenever possible.
