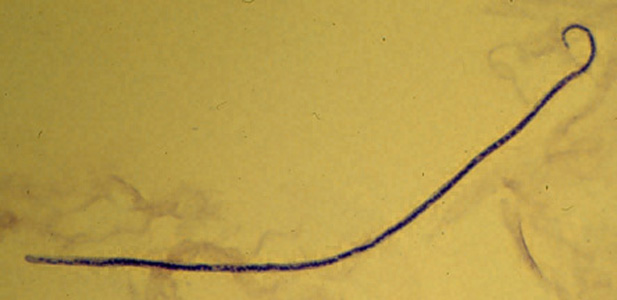

Scientific classification
- Kingdom: Animalia
- Phylum: Nematoda
- Class: Chromadorea
- Order: Rhabditida
- Family: Onchocercidae
- Genus: Mansonella
- Species: M. streptocerca

Binomial name
- Mansonella streptocerca (Macfie & Corson, 1922)

= Mansonella streptocerca =

Species of roundworm

Mansonella streptocerca (formerly Diptalonema streptocerca) is an arthropod-borne filarial nematode (roundworm) causing the disease streptocerciasis. It is a common parasite in the skin of humans in the rain forests of Africa, where it is thought to be a parasite of non-human primates, as well.

Mansonella streptocerca is one of three filarial nematodes that cause subcutaneous filariasis in humans. The other two are Loa loa (the African eye worm), and Onchocerca volvulus (agent of river blindness).

The worm is distributed across West and Central Africa.

== Life cycle ==
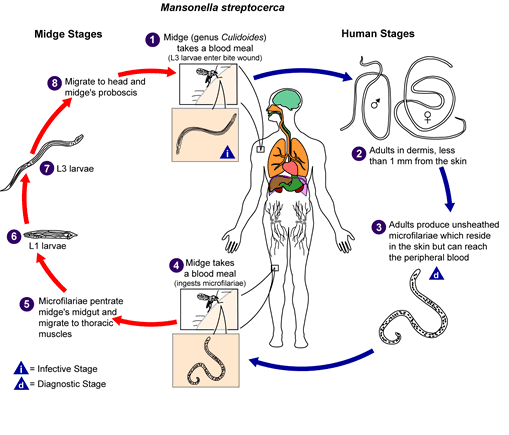
Life cycle of Mansonella streptocerca

The contraction of an M. streptocerca infection can be better understood through an understanding of its life cycle. The life cycle involves two stages: one involving a midge (genus Culicoides) and another involving a human host. First, a midge ingests a blood meal from a human host. This allows third-stage filarial larvae to enter the bite wound. Once inside the dermis, the larvae develop into adults, usually less than 1 mm from the surface of the skin. In terms of size, the females can reach 27 mm in length and 85 μm at midpoint, tapered at both ends, whereas the males can be around 50 μm in diameter. These adults then produce nonperiodic microfiliariae, which habitate in the skin, but can also travel to the peripheral blood. These microfilariae are then passed onto the midge when the insect ingests a blood meal. Following the blood meal, microfilariae travel to the midge’s midgut through the hemocoel to the thoracic muscles. In the thoracic muscles, the microfiliariae develop into first-stage larvae, followed up by third-stage development. In this latter stage, the larvae travel to the midge’s proboscis, where it can subsequently infect another human host upon another blood meal ingestion.

== Prevalence ==
Mansonella streptocerca has reportedly been found in West and Central Africa including Western Uganda, the Uganda-Zaire border, and the Bundibugyo district.

== Morphology ==
The adult form of M. streptocerca was discovered by Dr. Wayne M Meyers while working as a medical missionary in Africa. M. streptocerca adults have a unique posterior end that is bent, resembling the shape of a shepherd’s crook. This feature makes it possible for laboratory workers to distinguish M. streptocerca from other species of roundworms.

== Diagnosis ==
The infection of these roundworms typically causes no symptoms but may sometimes cause a mild dermatitis of the thorax and shoulders. M. streptocerca infections fortunately do not cause any nodules, skin disease, or ocular infections like those of Onchocerca volvulus. Differentiating between M. streptocerca and O. volvulvus infections may thus be easiest when clinical observations and history support laboratory findings, such as those made by microscopic reading of skin snips (thin skin biopsies).

== Treatment ==
Treatment of streptocerciasis includes the use of diethylcarbamazine (DEC) which is reportedly effective against the microfilarial and adult stage M. streptocerca, but not proven as a method of treatment. A common drug used to treat roundworms, ivermectin, is not proven to serve as a treatment for streptocerciasis although it is shown that ivermectin should not be used as a mass treatment in endemic areas where only M. streptocerca is found. This is because the side effects of the drug commonly outweigh the consequences of the infection.

== Prevention ==
Take preventative measures by using DEET or other insect repellents to ward off midges when traveling into endemic areas.

== See also ==
See Mansonelliasis.

- List of parasites (human)
