= Pulicosis =

- Other names: Flea bites
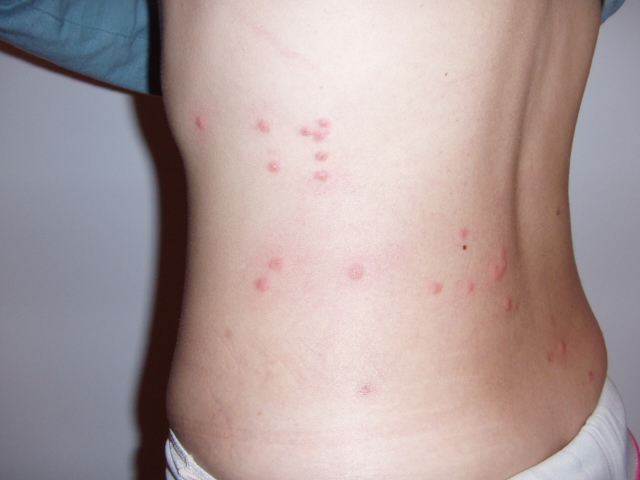
- Flea bites on the back of a human
- Specialty: Infectious diseases
- Symptoms: Swelling, soreness
- Complications: Flea allergy dermatitis, plague, murine typhus
- Causes: Fleas

Pulicosis is a skin condition caused by several species of fleas, including the cat flea (Ctenocephalides felis) and dog flea (Ctenocephalides canis). This condition can range from mild irritation to severe irritation. In some cases, 48 to 72 hours after being bitten, a more severe rash-like irritation may begin to spread across the body. Symptoms include swelling of the bitten area, erythema, ulcers of the mouth and throat, restlessness, and soreness of the areolae. In extreme cases, within 1 week after being bitten, the condition may spread through the lymph nodes and begin affecting the central nervous system. Permanent nerve damage can occur.

If they receive an excessive number of bites, pets can also develop flea allergy dermatitis, which can potentially be fatal if no actions are taken. However, dogs and cats are not the only ones that are at risk. Humans can be bitten by fleas and, depending on a variety of factors, the bites can cause much pain and discomfort.

== See also ==
- Dermatitis
