= European hedgehog in New Zealand =

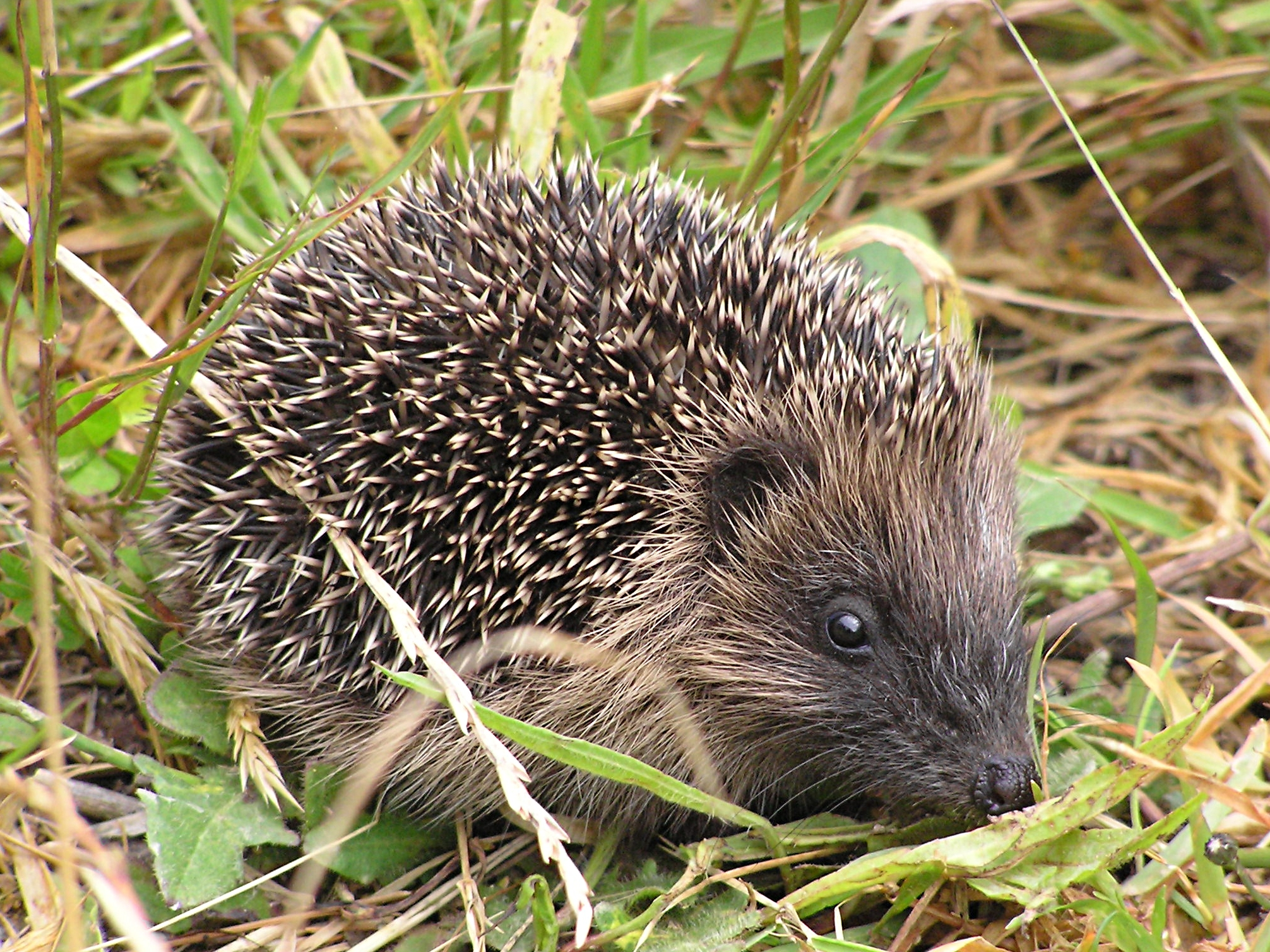
Young hedgehog found on the track outside the pest exclusion fence of the Karori Wildlife Sanctuary

The European hedgehog (Erinaceus europaeus) was brought to New Zealand by British colonists in the 1870s as a way to deal with insect pests that had hitched a ride on crops the colonists had brought from their homeland for farming. Long regarded as a gardener's helper in Britain, the introduction of hedgehogs seemed to be a good solution to the lack of natural predators for the pests in New Zealand. They have since spread throughout the country, being absent only in inhospitable environments. The general public has a benign attitude to them in urban environments, but conservationists and regional councils regard them as pests, as they prey on native animals and compete with them for food.

== Introductions and distribution ==
Discussions on importing hedgehogs into New Zealand began as early as 1868. The first recorded introductions of the European hedgehog (Erinaceus europaeus occidentalis) were by the Canterbury Acclimatisation Society in 1870, with subsequent introductions in 1871, 1885, 1890 and 1894. It is likely that they all came from Britain.

Beyond acclimatisation, hedgehogs were introduced to control garden pests such as slugs, snails and grass grubs.

Throughout much of the 20th century New Zealand-born hedgehogs were liberated in many parts of the country, from those few animals, hedgehog numbers increased dramatically. In the 1920s hedgehogs were so numerous that they were blamed for reducing the tally of small game birds and a bounty was put on their noses. By the 1950s hedgehog numbers reached their maximum. To judge by roadkill figures, hedgehogs were 50 times more numerous in New Zealand than anywhere else. Since the 1950s, their numbers have fallen but over large parts of New Zealand hedgehogs are still more numerous than in Britain.

By 1972 they may have reached their maximum range. Today hedgehogs are present in almost all habitats, including urban, rural, braided river and forest areas. The few areas they are not present in are inhospitable environments like above the permanent snow line and in the wettest parts of Fiordland.

== Acclimatisation to New Zealand habitat ==
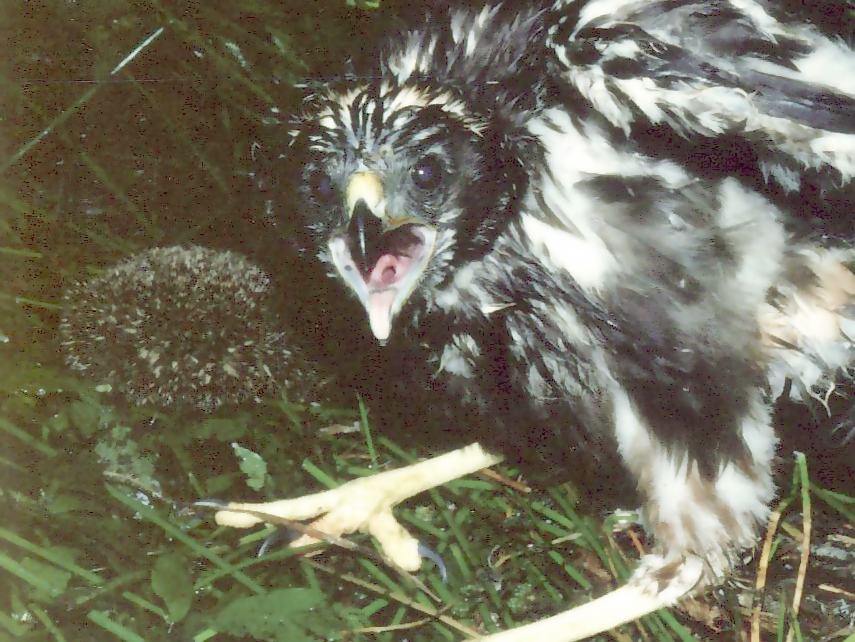
Australasian harrier hawk chick with dead hedgehog

Since coming to New Zealand the hedgehog has grown a little smaller and never reaches the size or weight of animals in Britain and continental Europe. This is because European animals must reach a larger size and greater weight to survive the 6 month long period of hibernation. In central and southern New Zealand, hedgehogs hibernate for about three months of the year but few hibernate at all in the warmer northern parts of the country.

Wild pigs, dogs, cats are predators of the hedgehog, and the flightless, endemic weka and pūkeko will prey on nestlings. The Australasian harrier hawk scavenges road killed hedgehogs (along with anything else killed on the roads), but it is unknown whether they actively prey on them.

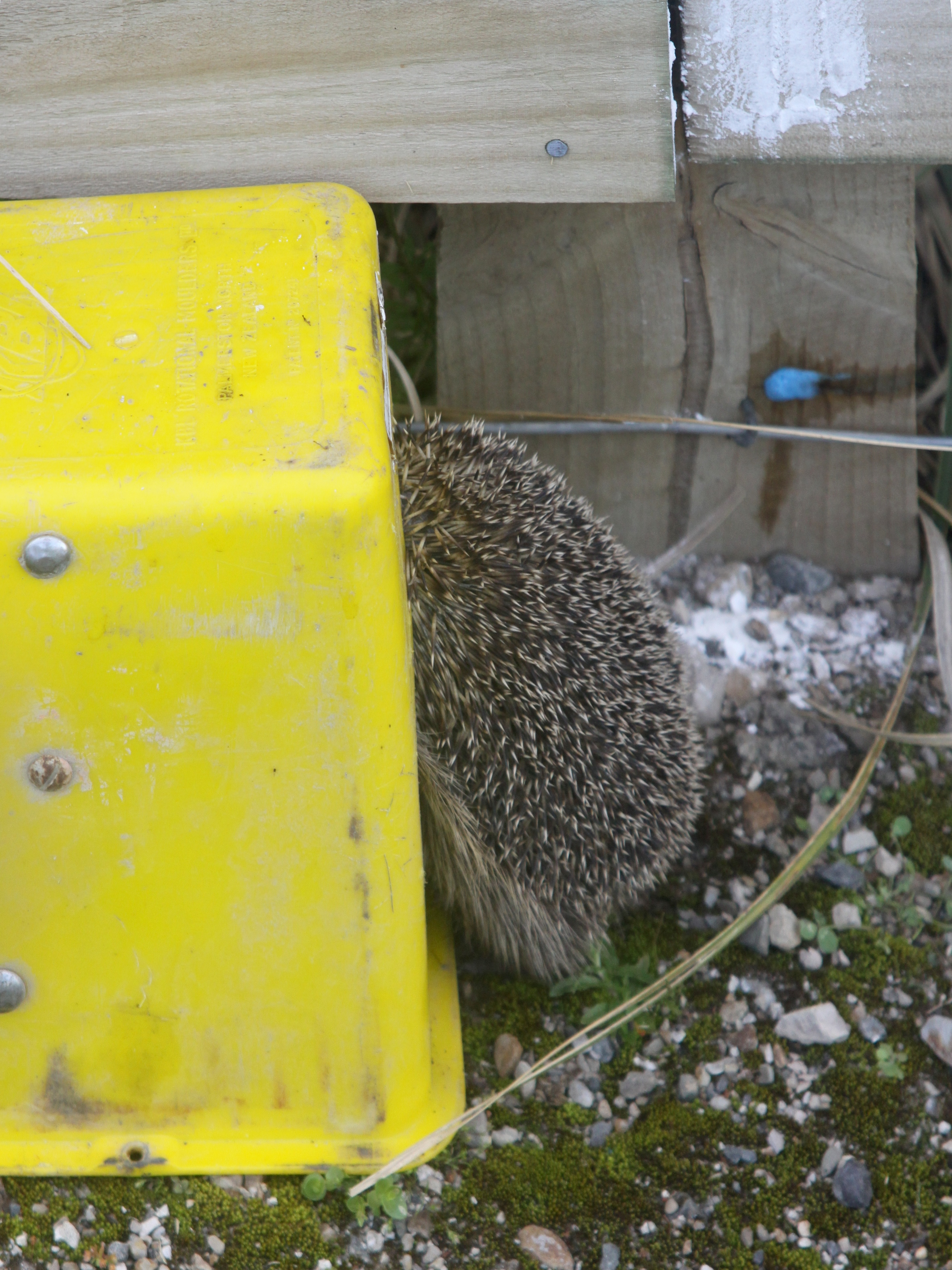
Hedgehog caught in a Timms trap

== Relationships with humans ==
Many people have a benign attitude to these introduced predators who eat garden pests, and a few have implemented hedgehog rescue efforts.

Following studies, the Department of Conservation (DOC), regional and local councils have now recognised the damage hedgehogs cause and now actively attempt to manage their population.

== Threat to native fauna ==
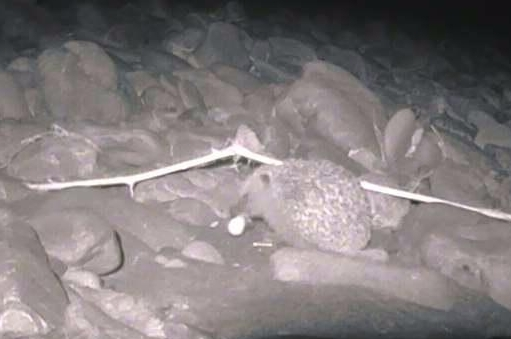
Hedgehog eating black-fronted tern egg

Hedgehogs prey on the endangered, endemic giant snails (Powelliphanta), the endemic wētā species, and various other native invertebrates. The critically endangered Cromwell chafer beetle (Prodontria lewisi) is threatened due to predation by hedgehogs as well as other introduced species.

Their diet includes the eggs and chicks of ground-nesting birds, so they may have already contributed to the decline and extinction of up to fifteen bird species and are a threat to those that remain. They also pose a threat to endangered native skinks.

Hedgehogs are therefore humanely controlled in many parts of New Zealand. DOC says on its website "You can help stop hedgehogs, don't encourage them into your backyard by creating burrows for them or leaving milk out. Set a suitable trap for the situation you are in (suburban or rural)" and goes on to describe the trapping systems recommended, which are kill traps.

== Diseases ==
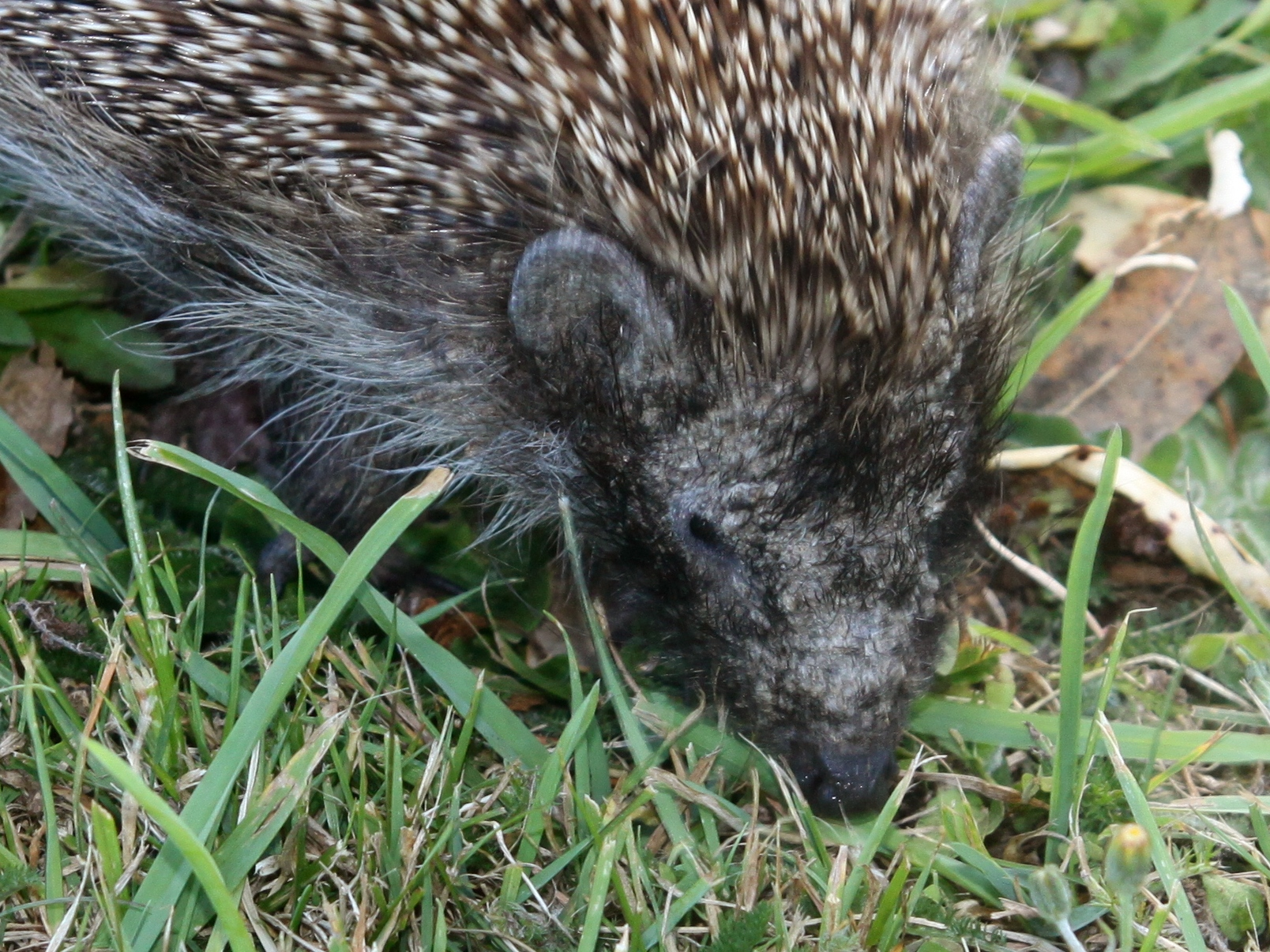
Young hedgehog with skin diseases

In Europe hedgehogs carry a large number of the hedgehog flea (Archaeopsylla erinacei). But it appears that none survived the six-month voyage to New Zealand in the 19th century, so the New Zealand animals are free of fleas. But they suffer from another ectoparasite - mange mites (Caparinia tripilis) which are environmental and are not hedgehog exclusive. These mites bury their eggs in the skin where they later hatch and cause many health issues for the hedgehog host. The parasite blinds and kills large numbers of hedgehogs and probably played a big role in reducing their numbers. These are the same mites that may be carried by domesticated cats and dogs, and are environmental mites.

== See also ==
- Mammals of New Zealand
- Conservation in New Zealand
- Burton Silver, a New Zealand cartoonist whose Bogor cartoon strip often featured hedgehogs

== Papers ==
- Brockie, R.E. 1960: Road mortality of the hedgehog (Erinaceus europaeus L) in New Zealand. Proceedings of the Zoological Society of London. 134: 505–508.
- Brockie, R.E. 1964: Dental abnormalities in European and New Zealand hedgehogs. Nature. 202. 1355–56.
- Brockie, R.E. 1974: The hedgehog mange mite Caparinia tripilis in New Zealand. New Zealand Veterinary Journal 22" 243–47.
- Brockie, R.E., R.F.M.S. Sadleir & W.L. Linklater 2009. Long-term wildlife road-kill in New Zealand. New Zealand Journal of Zoology. 36:
