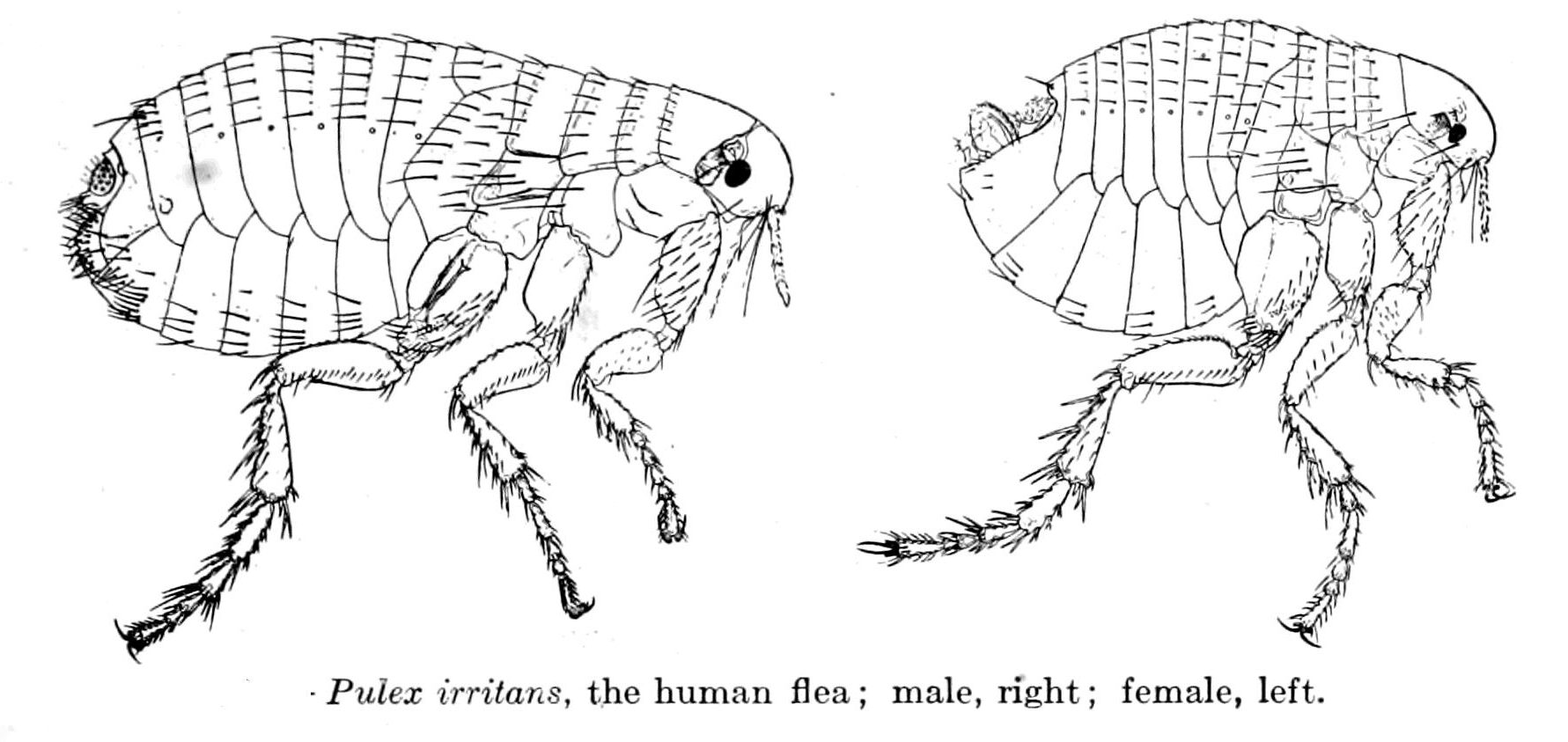
- Pulex irritans (human flea)

Scientific classification
- Kingdom: Animalia
- Phylum: Arthropoda
- Class: Insecta
- Order: Siphonaptera
- Family: Pulicidae
- Subfamily: Pulicinae
- Genus: Pulex; Linnaeus, 1758

= Pulex =

Genus of fleas

Pulex is a genus of fleas. It comprises seven species. One is the human flea (P. irritans), and five of the others are confined to the Nearctic and Neotropical realms.

== Species ==
Encyclopedia of Life lists seven species:

- Pulex alvarezi Barrera, 1955
- Pulex echidnophagoides (Wagner, 1933)
- Pulex irritans Linnaeus, 1758
- Pulex larimerius Lewis et Grimaldi, 1997
- Pulex porcinus Jordan et Rothschild, 1923
- Pulex simulans Baker, 1895
- Pulex sinoculus Traub, 1950
