= Murine typhus =

Bacterial infection transmitted by fleas

- Other names: Endemic typhus
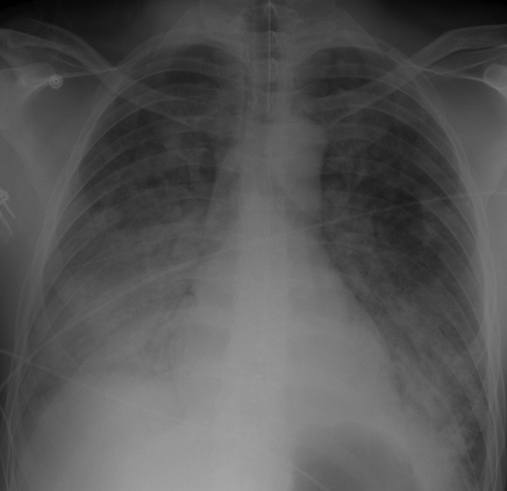
- Chest Xray of a 40 yr old male in acute respiratory distress syndrome as a complication of murine typhus
- Specialty: Infectious disease

Murine typhus, also known as endemic typhus or flea-borne typhus, is a form of typhus caused by Rickettsia typhi transmitted by fleas (Xenopsylla cheopis), usually on rats, in contrast to epidemic typhus which is usually transmitted by lice. Murine typhus is an under-recognized entity, as it is often confused with viral illnesses. Most people who are infected do not realize that they have been bitten by fleas. Historically the term "hunger-typhus" was used in accounts by British POWs in Germany at the end of World War I when they described conditions in Germany.

== Names ==
Murine typhus is also commonly known as endemic or flea-borne typhus, other names include shop, urban, Mexican, and rat typhus.

== Signs and symptoms ==
Symptoms occur after 6–14 days with common symptoms being pyrexia, dermatitis, prostration, delirium, and in severe cases coma. Untreated patients may be bedridden for 2–3 months and some are unable to work.

== Transmission ==
Rickettsia typhi is the causative agent of murine typhus, the primary host species are Rattus rattus and R. norvegicus with transmission occurring via the faeces of fleas (typically Xenopsylla). The bacteria is excreted in the faeces of fleas and when a flea bite is scratched or picked at the bacteria enters the skin and commences infection. Other peridomestic rats and rodents are capable of being infected. Rats can also be infected from Hoplopleura pacifica, Polyplax spinulosa, Laelaps echidnina, Ornithonyssus bacoti, and chiggers.

R. typhi is not lethal to rats and simply causes rickettsaemia (rickettsiae in blood). Fleas feed on infected rats and become infected with the rickettsiae spreading to the midgut epthilelial cells and replicating there, infected cells move to the gut lumen and are excreted with faeces. The most common flea vector is Xenopsylla cheopis with other species being X. astia, X. bantorum, X. brasiliensis, Ctenocephalides felis, Pulex irritans, Leptopsylla segnis, and Nosopsyllus fasciatus. X. cheopis has been shown to transfer R. typhi via bite in experimental settings and it has been theorised that aerosol transmission from faeces is possible as well. Some arthropods such as mites and chiggers can transfer R. typhi to rats but do not transfer the bacteria to humans.

== Epidemiology ==
Murine typhus is a global disease found on all continents bar Antarctica. Significant volumes of cases occur Indonesia, China, North Africa, Central America, and Thailand. In the United States most cases occur in Texas, with homeless people in Houston having significant seropositivity.

== Diagnosis ==
Diagnosis of murine typhus in humans is done via testing for antibodies to R. typhi or isolation of R. typhi from a blood or tissue sample. Enzyme-linked immunosorbent assays and polymerase chain reaction (PCR) tests can be used in the diagnosis of fleas and other animals.

== Prognosis ==
Different strains of R. typhi have different virulence, with New World strains having a fatality of around 2%, with Old World strains having fatality rates up to 70%. Despite this over 95% of untreated cases recover, although recovery can take 2–3 months.

== Treatment ==
Antibiotics are used to treat murine typhus with doxycycline and tetracycline being common.

== See also ==
- List of mites associated with cutaneous reactions
