= Xenopsylla gratiosa =

Scientific classification
- Kingdom: Animalia
- Phylum: Arthropoda
- Clade: Pancrustacea
- Class: Insecta
- Order: Siphonaptera
- Family: Pulicidae
- Genus: Xenopsylla
- Species: X. gratiosa

Binomial name
- Xenopsylla gratiosa Jordan & Rothschild, 1923

Species of flea

Xenopsylla gratiosa is a flea found on seabirds including the European storm petrel. Along with dermanyssid mites, these blood-sucking parasites slow the growth rate of nestlings and may affect their survival rate.
