= Rickettsia typhi =

Scientific classification
- Domain: Bacteria
- Kingdom: Pseudomonadati
- Phylum: Pseudomonadota
- Class: Alphaproteobacteria
- Order: Rickettsiales
- Family: Rickettsiaceae
- Genus: Rickettsia
- Species group: Typhus group
- Species: R. typhi

Binomial name
- Rickettsia typhi (Wolbach and Todd, 1920) Philip, 1943

Species of bacterium

Rickettsia typhi is a small, aerobic, obligate intracellular, rod shaped gram negative bacterium. It belongs to the typhus group of the Rickettsia genus, along with R. prowazekii. R. typhi has an uncertain history, as it may have long gone shadowed by epidemic typhus (R. prowazekii). This bacterium is recognized as a biocontainment level 2/3 organism. R. typhi is a flea-borne disease that is best known to be the causative agent for the disease murine typhus, which is an endemic typhus in humans that is distributed worldwide. As with all rickettsial organisms, R. typhi is a zoonotic agent that causes the disease murine typhus, displaying non-specific mild symptoms of fevers, headaches, pains and rashes. There are two cycles of R. typhi transmission from animal reservoirs containing R. typhi to humans: a classic rat-flea-rat cycle that is most well studied and common, and a secondary periodomestic cycle that could involve cats, dogs, opossums, sheep, and their fleas.

R. typhi was once one of the most prevalent causes of rickettsial diseases worldwide, but has since experienced a drop in case reports with the implementation of pest control programs. The microorganism is concentrated in warmer climate and coastal ports where there is an abundance of rats and their fleas, which are the preferred hosts for the pathogen. R. typhi is transmitted between competent flea and mammalian hosts through flea bites and contact with infected feces and tissues.

There are several laboratory tests available for the diagnosis of Rickettsial species, with the traditional diagnosis based on serology. However, newer laboratory techniques such as real-time PCR and microimmunofluorescence can be used to identify Rickettsia faster and down to the Rickettsia typhi species level.

== History and taxonomy ==
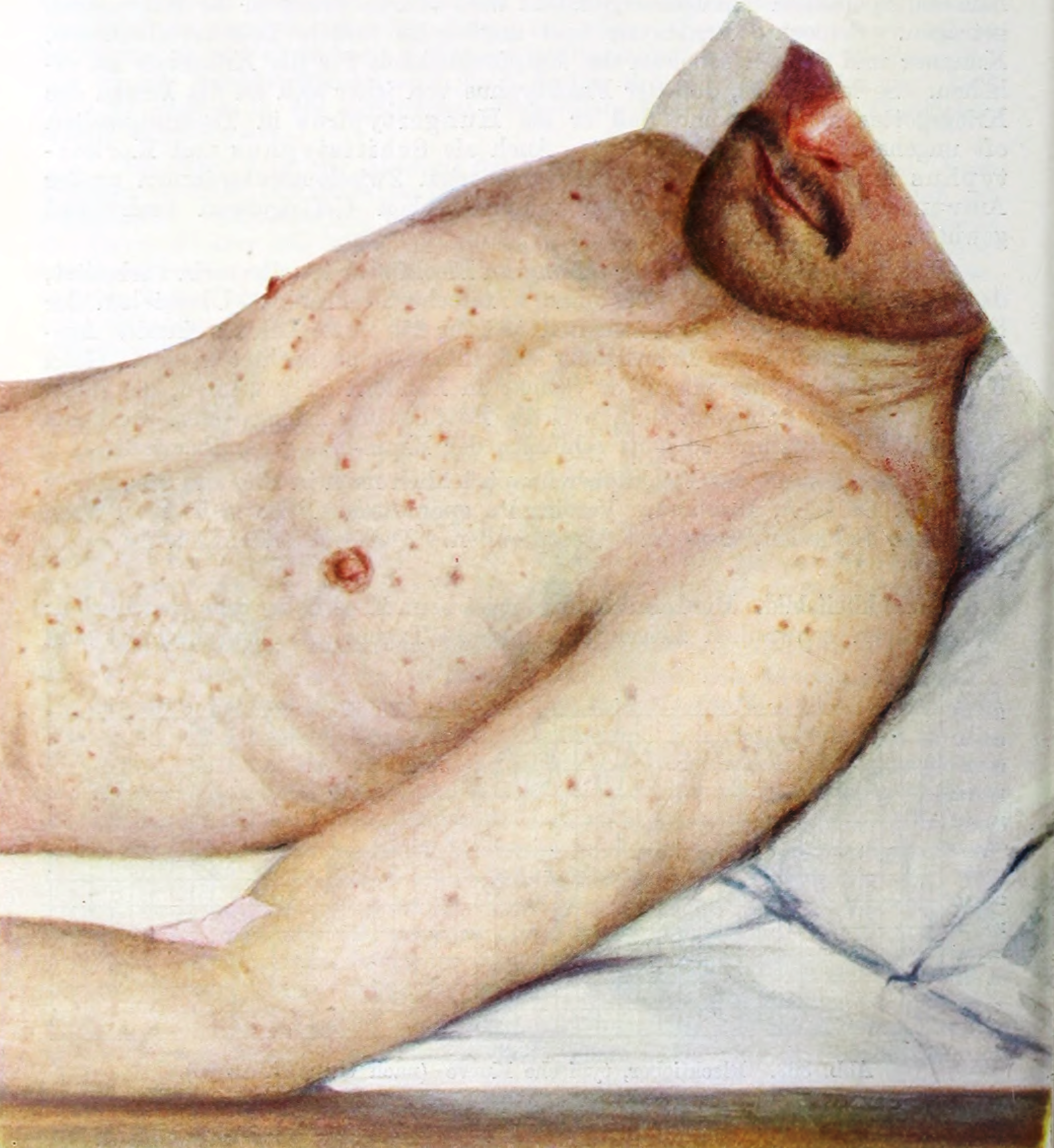
Rickettsia typhus group rash, a common symptom of infection

In the early 20th century epidemic typhus (R. prowazekii) ran rampant throughout many parts of the world. It was associated with high mortality, high virulence, and thought to be transmitted via louse. During this period, less severe and untraceable cases began appearing. These cases were characterized by fever, rash, headache, as well as musculoskeletal and gastro intestinal signs. Epidemiologist Kenneth F Maxy recognized this and began questioning and isolating the presence of another typhus within the United States aside from R. prowazekii, he detailed this in an article released in 1926. Maxy speculated the presence of another arthropod vector transmitting this new form of typhus, which would later be discovered as R. typhi. It is thought that R. typhi has historically been under diagnosed compared to its typhus group member R. prowazekii. The discovery of R. typhi lead to the creation of the typhus group Rickettsia, which contains R. typhi and R. prowazekii. Rickettsia species are generally broken into 3 groups, the spotted fever group, typhus group and scrub typhus group.

== Cellular morphology and motility ==
Rickettsia typhi is a small, aerobic, obligate intracellular, rod shaped, gram negative bacterium. R. typhi is a zoonotic bacterium that is recognized as a biocontainment level 2/3 organism (dependent upon the tissue being worked with). As obligate intracellular pathogens, R. typhi can be difficult to isolate, and are not able to be cultured using standard plating methods seen with most other organisms. R. typhi are motile, creating movement through actin based motility, with little control over directionality and speed, and are often seen moving in a circular pattern.

== Virulence ==
Rickettsia typhi is a flea-borne disease organism and is widely distributed throughout the world. There are two cycles in R. typhi transmission from animal reservoirs to human: a classic rat-flea-rat cycle, and a peridomestic cycle involving cats, dogs, opossums, sheep, and their fleas.

=== Classic rat-flea-rat cycle ===
R. typhi circulates amongst rats (Rattus rattus or Rattus norvegicus) and rat fleas (Xenopyslla cheopis), but other rodents and their ectoparasites also play a role in maintaining R. typhi in nature. While the rat flea is the main vector of R. typhi, P. h. humanus, Polypax lice and bloodsucking mites of rats have been reported to be capable of acquiring R. typhi, either naturally or experimentally.

Transmission of R. typhi from the rat flea is affected by contact with rickettsia-containing flea feces during or after blood feeding, as well as via flea bite. The rickettsiae have no harmful effects on the fitness of either the vector or the rat, showing a true mutual relationship. Infected fleas can maintain R. typhi for life, giving them potential for infecting large number of susceptible hosts.

=== Peridomestic cycle ===
Thus far, there have not been many studies on the periodomestic animal cycle of transmission, with the majority that have been done focusing on cats.

It has been shown that R. typhi can be present in cats and the cat flea, Ctenocephalides felis, which is a flea species that readily bites humans. So far, there has been no direct human R. typhi infections from cats, but instead an association between high rates of infected cats related to human cases of murine typhus in the same geographical location.

There is also some evidence that other domestic animals such as dogs and sheep, as well as opossums, could be involved in the R. typhi transmission cycle, but studies are currently limited.

=== Pathogenesis ===
Rickettsia spp. including R. typhi enter the skin and spread through the bloodstream to infect the endothelium lining the blood vessels. This leads to vascular inflammation, damage to vascular integrity, and compromised vascular permeability, which is collectively known as 'Rickettsial vasculitis'

== Disease ==
=== Murine typhus (endemic typhus) in humans ===
Rickettsia typhi is a causative agent of murine typhus (endemic typhus) in humans and is distributed worldwide. It is an acute, febrile illness that is mainly transmitted by the fleas of rodents, commonly associated with cities and ports where urban rats (Rattus rattus and Rattus norvegicus) are abundant. Humans acquire infection by inhalation or by self-inoculating infected fleas or flea feces into skin when they visit disease-endemic areas infested with rats. Most patients present with a fever, and many have a rash and headache, although it can also lead to disseminated, multisystem disease including infections of the brain, lung, liver, kidney, and heart endothelia. As these signs and symptoms are similar to those produced by other diseases, including other rickettsiae, murine typhus is difficult to diagnose clinically. In addition to non-uniform and non-specific symptoms, there is a lack of diagnostic tests effective during the acute stages of the illness, leading to delayed appropriate treatment. Murine typhus may generally be clinically mild, but severe and even fatal cases have been reported. The severity of murine typhus infection has been associated with age, race, and delayed diagnosis. Doxycycline is the antibiotic of choice as it is shown to shorten the course of illness, although 99% of those infected will clear the disease within weeks without specific treatment.

== Epidemiology ==
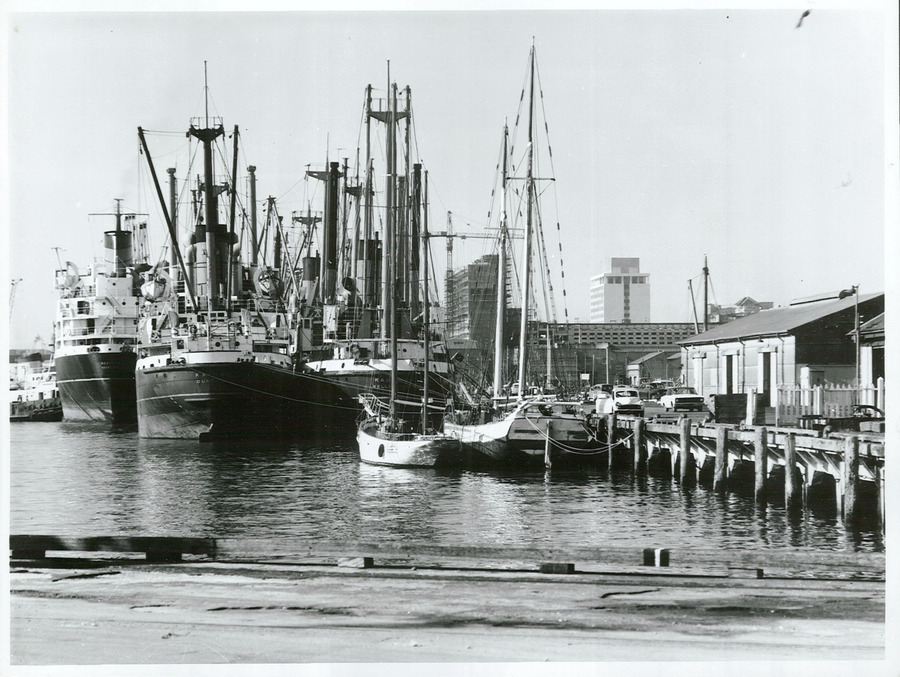
Transmission of R. typhi is common in sea ports, where there is an abundance of rats and their fleas.

=== Geographical and temporal distribution ===
Rickettsia typhi is a small, gram-negative intracellular bacterium that establishes the murine typhus infection in mammals and fleas. Murine typhus was once one of the most prevalent rickettsial diseases in the world, having isolated the R. typhi causative agent from nearly every continent around the globe except for Antarctica. In addition to the widespread distribution, the bacterium is particularly concentrated in regions that boast warmer climates year-round and hug the coasts. This predilection is due to these regions' favourable climatic conditions for the survival of flea and wildlife hosts, leading to their greater abundance and ability to maintain the rickettsial organism as reservoirs in the environment. Seaports are exceptional foci for R. typhi as infected rodents and their ectoparasites could be introduced through the international movement of ships. These ports can subsequently transfer the pathogen to nearby cities that line the main routes of trade. Spikes in R. typhi infections are also reported from late Spring to early Autumn when flea populations are especially high.

Historically, thousands of murine typhus cases were reported in the United States every year; however, the disease experienced a sudden decline in incidence in the 1940s with the implementation of pest control programs to remove the flea and rodent reservoirs responsible for rickettsial transmission in urban dwellings. Murine typhus infections in the present are more sporadic and infrequent, with fewer than 100 cases reported in the US annually. Nevertheless, R. typhi is still regarded as a bacterium of considerable public health significance, and outbreaks are commonly reported in the Southern US, Southern Europe, Asia, Africa, and Australia. It is estimated that R. typhi prevalence is actually higher than the measured value, since murine typhus is often underreported and misdiagnosed because of its non-specific and mild clinical presentation (fever, headache, generalized pain, and rashes). Undiagnosed infections are predicted to outnumber reported cases by 4:1. A recent study presented a clinical case of a patient that works in the Brazilian Amazon and presented an unspecific febrile illness probably caused by Rickettsia typhi since the patient presented specific antibodies to this bacteria. This shows that the R. typhi geographical distribution can be wider than expected.

=== Host range and transmission ===
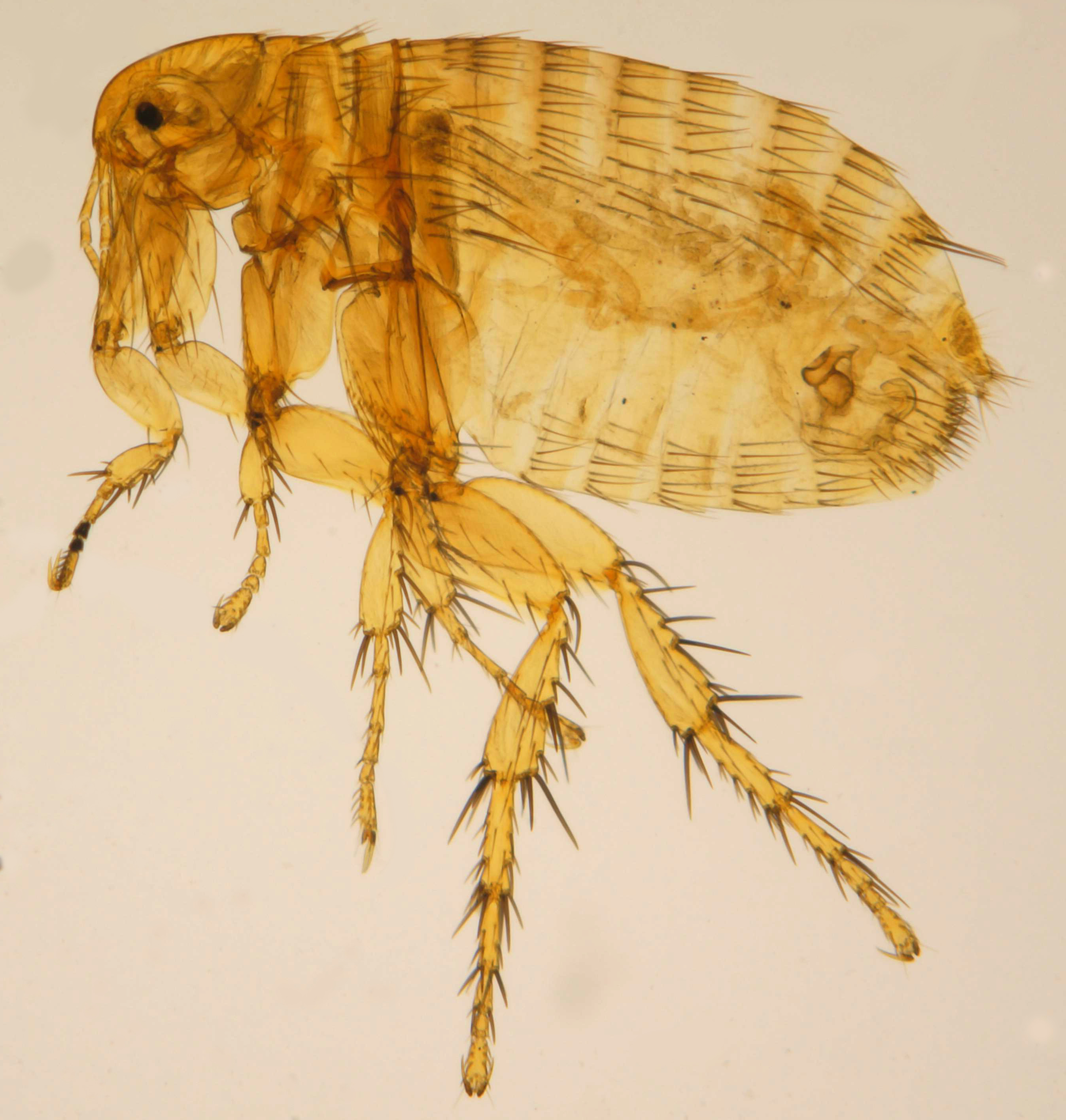
The Oriental rat flea (Xenopsylla cheopis) is a common vector host for R. typhi

The R. typhi microorganism obligately resides within the epithelial cells of the midgut in flea hosts, and the endothelial cells lining the vasculature of mammalian species. The bacterium's lifecycle classically involves the Oriental rat flea (Xenopsylla cheopis) and the black (Rattus rattus) and brown (Rattus norvegicus) rats. These globally distributed hosts are especially proficient at transmitting this rickettsiae for many reasons: X. cheopis has an incredibly wide host range and can thus transmit the bacterium to a broad set of mammalian hosts, including humans; members of the genus Rattus enable R. typhi to undergo massive rounds of binary fission within eukaryotic cells and increase the number of bacteria available to infect flea vectors. In addition to rats and their fleas, other hosts have been observed to naturally carry the microparasite as well, including cats and their fleas (Ctenocephalides felis), opossums, shrews, skunks, house mice and their fleas (Leptopsylla segnis), and rarely dogs. Cats and opossums are thought to be fairly significant reservoirs for murine typhus in urban environments due to their unpicky ectoparasites and close association with humans.

The bacterium transmits from an infected rat (or other mammalian host) to a susceptible rat flea (or other arthropod vector) through a blood meal, and is then transmitted from an infected flea to another susceptible rat through direct contact with the infectious feces or tissues of the vector. Transmission through contact with arthropod feces may be through an open wound, the respiratory tract (inhalation), or the conjunctivae of the mammalian host. There is evidence that flea bite transmission is possible as well after the bacterium undergoes a certain incubation period in the arthropod vector. Female fleas can also pass the infection onto offspring through transovarial transmission. R. typhi appears to be in a truly commensal relationship with these insect and non-human hosts, as it only produces an asymptomatic infection that has no effect on host life span or reproductivity. Because of its versatility in transmission, the R. typhi bacterium is very successful in perpetuating its numbers in endemic regions.

=== Zoonotic potential ===
As with all rickettsiae species, R. typhi is a zoonotic agent with humans serving as aberrant dead-end hosts, and thus do not play an ecological role in the bacterium's transmission and lifecycle. Humans are most commonly infected through flea and rat R. typhi carriers in indoor environments, typically affecting individuals in occupations or living conditions that surround heavy rodent and flea populations. The murine typhus disease is generally considered a mild affliction, with a 4% case fatality rate in untreated patients. Proper murine typhus oversight is especially critical in elderly patients that often require hospitalization as the disease progresses.

== Diagnosis and identification ==
The laboratory tests available for the diagnosis of Rickettsial species includes: shell vial assay, PCR-based detection, immunodetection, circulating endothelial cells, and serodiagnostic tests such as the Weil-Felix test, CF test, ELISA, microimmunofluorescence, immunoperoxidase, line blot and Western immunoblot tests.

Traditionally, the diagnosis of Rickettsia was based on serology However, serologic tests take about 15 days after the onset of symptoms for there to be diagnostically significant titers of R. tyhpi. And so the diagnosis is often confirmed after the patient has either recovered or died. R. typhi are not able to grow in axenic or sterile conditions, and must be grown in tissue, or embryo samples. Even when stringent physiologic conditions are met, when grown in media that mimics the environment of host cytoplasm, pathogen activity cannot survive very long. A common method for growing R. typhi is through the yolk sacs of embryonic eggs.

Laboratory techniques such as real-time PCR and microimmunofluorescence can be used to identify Rickettsia down to the species level. Microimmunofluorescence is a highly sensitive test that is often used in endemic areas to confirm infection by R. typhi. The use of real-time PCR can allow for the detection and confirmation of R. typhi earlier than serological tests. Membrane protein ompB and prsA gene fragments have been shown to be identifiable markers in qPCR for R. typhi.

Vitellus or "yolk" of an embryonic egg is a commonly used site for growth of the obligate intracellular bacterium R. typhi

=== Differentiation from R. prowazekii ===
Symptoms of R. typhi and R. prowazekii can be very similar, with R. typhi infections usually being less severe. R. typhi and its typhus group member R. prowazekii are composed of very similar genomes, R. typhi can be differentiated from R. prowazekii by 12000 base pairs inserted into R. prowazekii. There are various methods to differentiate among the typhus group members. One method is through restriction fragment length polymorphism (RFLP), which can differentiate the two species based on the ompB gene and associated enzymes, which has a unique sequence for each species. Serological methods are also useful. It has been shown that utilizing indirect fluorescent antibody assays and western blot analysis together provide reliable differentiation among the species. Serum cross-adsorbent analysis alone is also a reliable method for differentiation, as cross reaction between the two species is common.
