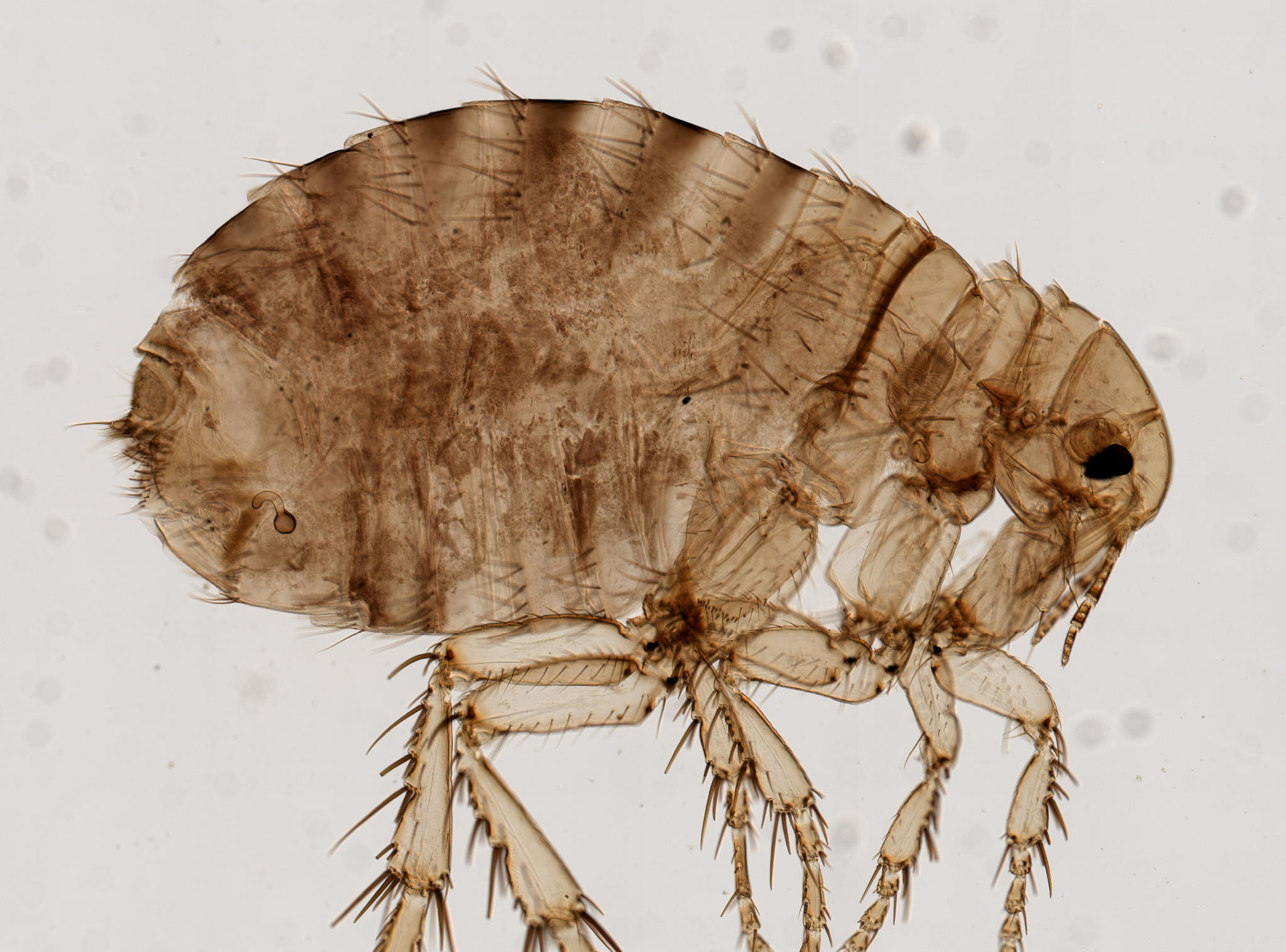
- Pulex irritans under a microscope

Scientific classification
- Kingdom: Animalia
- Phylum: Arthropoda
- Class: Insecta
- Order: Siphonaptera
- Family: Pulicidae
- Subfamily: Pulicinae

Genera
- Delopsylla; Echidnophaga; Pulex

= Pulicinae =

Subfamily of fleas

The Pulicinae form a flea subfamily (or in other classifications a tribe called Pulicini) in the family Pulicidae.
