= Wheat warehouse itch =

- Specialty: Dermatology

Wheat warehouse itch is a cutaneous condition caused by a mite, Cheyletus malaccensis.

== See also ==
- Murine typhus
- List of cutaneous conditions
