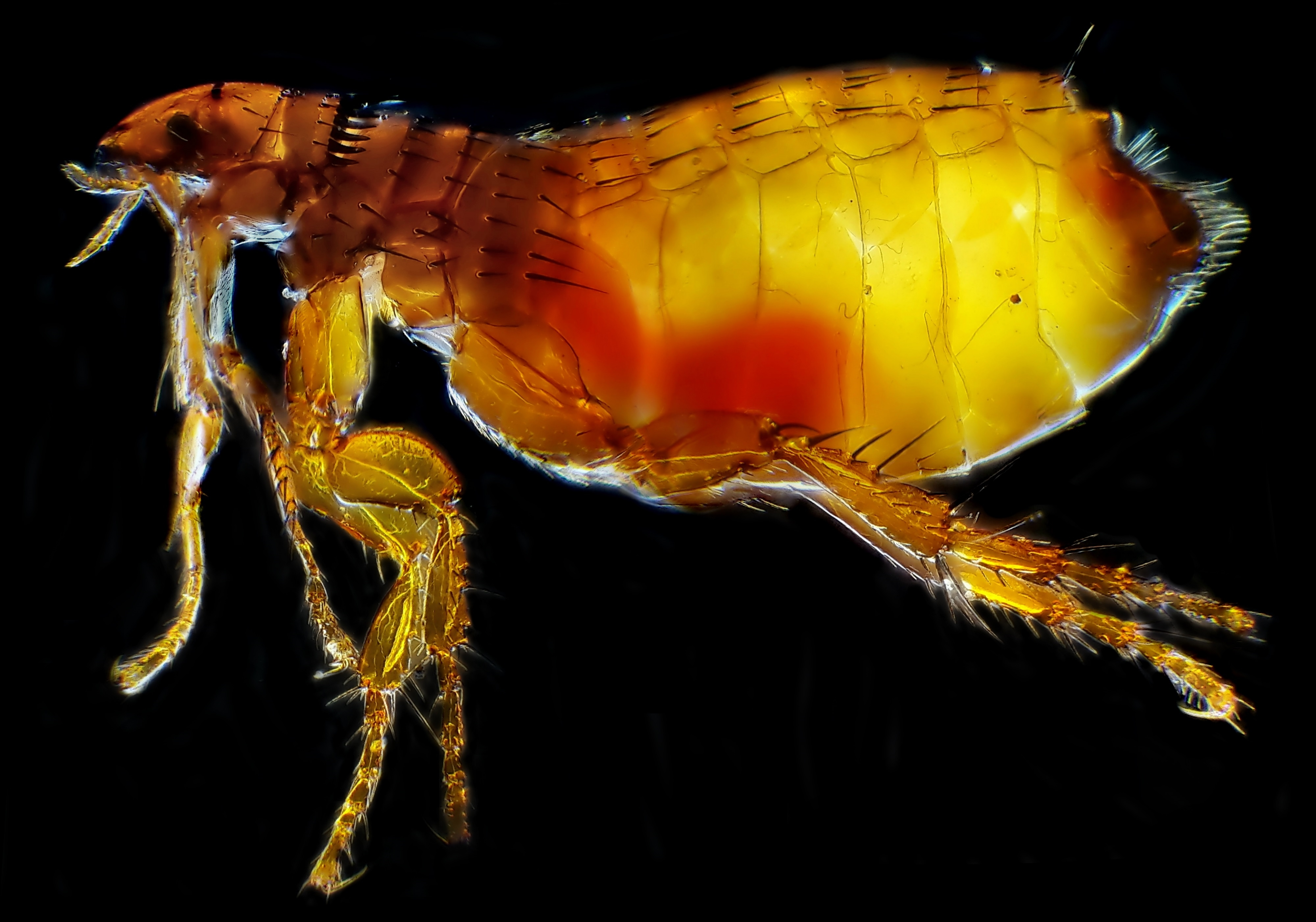
- Female cat flea (Ctenocephalides felis)

Scientific classification
- Kingdom: Animalia
- Phylum: Arthropoda
- Clade: Pancrustacea
- Class: Insecta
- Order: Siphonaptera
- Family: Pulicidae
- Subfamily: Archaeopsyllinae; Oudemans, 1909

Genera
- Archaeopsylla; Centetipsylla; Ctenocephalides

= Archaeopsyllinae =

Tribe of fleas

The Archaeopsyllinae form a flea subfamily (or depending on the classification a tribe called Archaeopsyllini) in the family Pulicidae.
