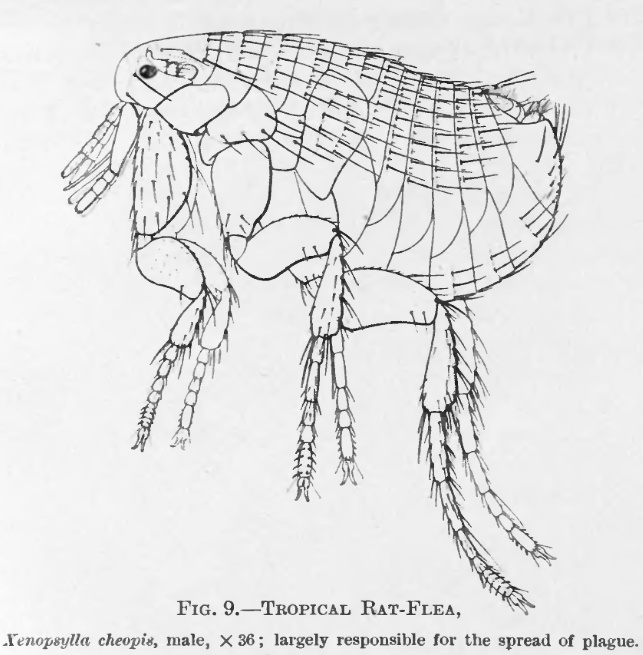
- Xenopsylla cheopis, the Oriental rat flea

Scientific classification
- Domain: Eukaryota
- Kingdom: Animalia
- Phylum: Arthropoda
- Class: Insecta
- Order: Siphonaptera
- Family: Pulicidae
- Subfamily: Xenopsyllinae; Glinkiewicz, 1907

Genera
- Parapulex; Pariodontis; Procaviopsylla; Pulicella; Synopsyllus; Synosternus; Xenopsylla

= Xenopsyllinae =

Subfamily of fleas

The Xenopsyllinae form a flea subfamily (or depending on classifications a tribe called Xenopsyllini) in the family Pulicidae.
