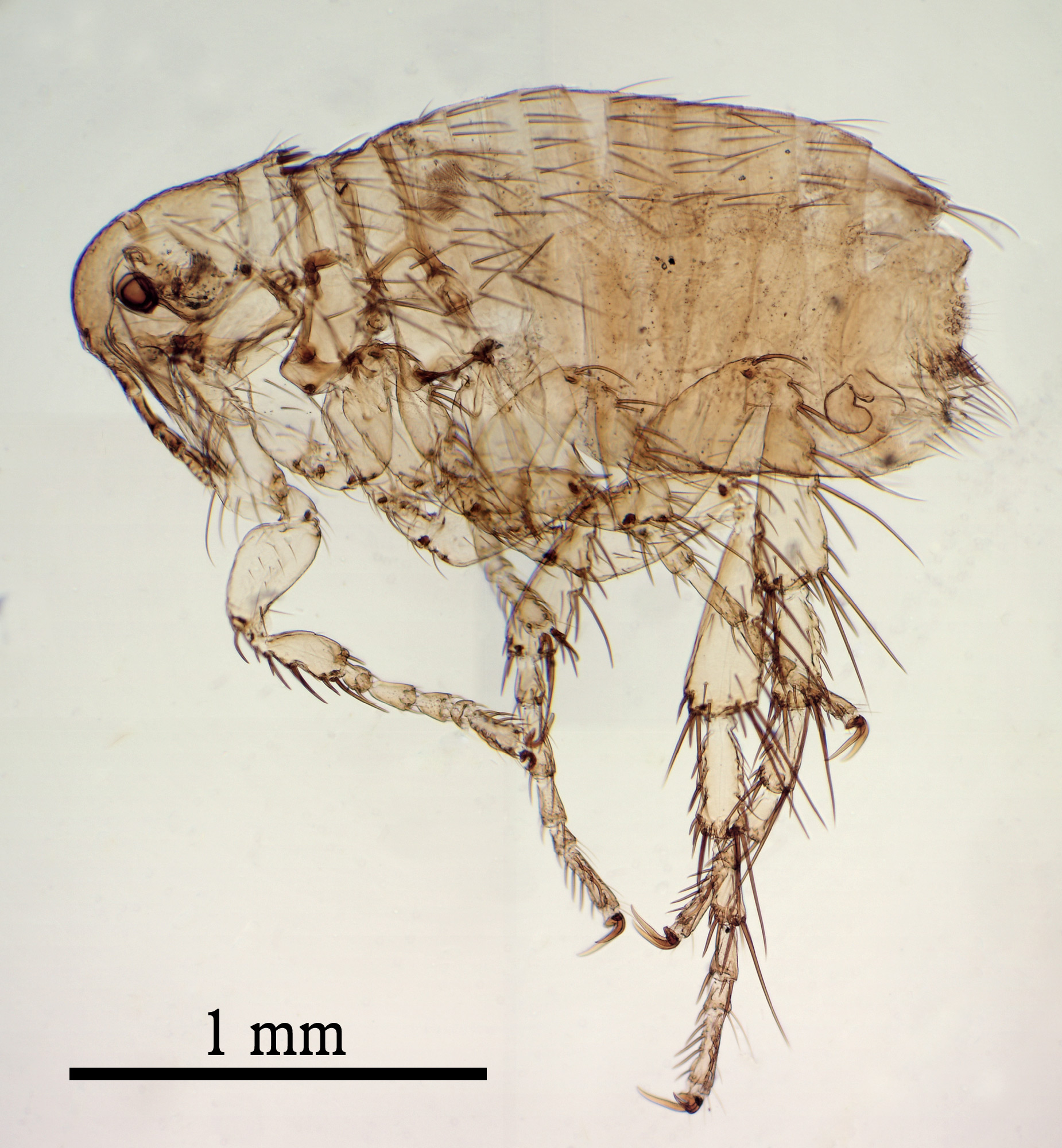
- Ctenocephalides canis

Scientific classification
- Kingdom: Animalia
- Phylum: Arthropoda
- Clade: Pancrustacea
- Class: Insecta
- Order: Siphonaptera
- Family: Pulicidae
- Subfamily: Archaeopsyllinae
- Genus: Ctenocephalides; Stiles & Collins, 1930

Species and subspecies
- Ctenocephalides canis; Ctenocephalides connatus; Ctenocephalides felis; Ctenocephalides felis damarensis; Ctenocephalides felis felis; Ctenocephalides felis strongylus; Ctenocephalides orientis

= Ctenocephalides =

Genus of fleas

Ctenocephalides is a flea genus in the subfamily Archaeopsyllinae which includes the cat flea, Ctenocephalides felis and the dog flea, C canis. Species and subspecies in the genus infest a wide variety of hosts, including sheep and goats, wild carnivores (such as foxes, civets and jackals), hares, hyraxes, ground squirrels and hedgehogs.
