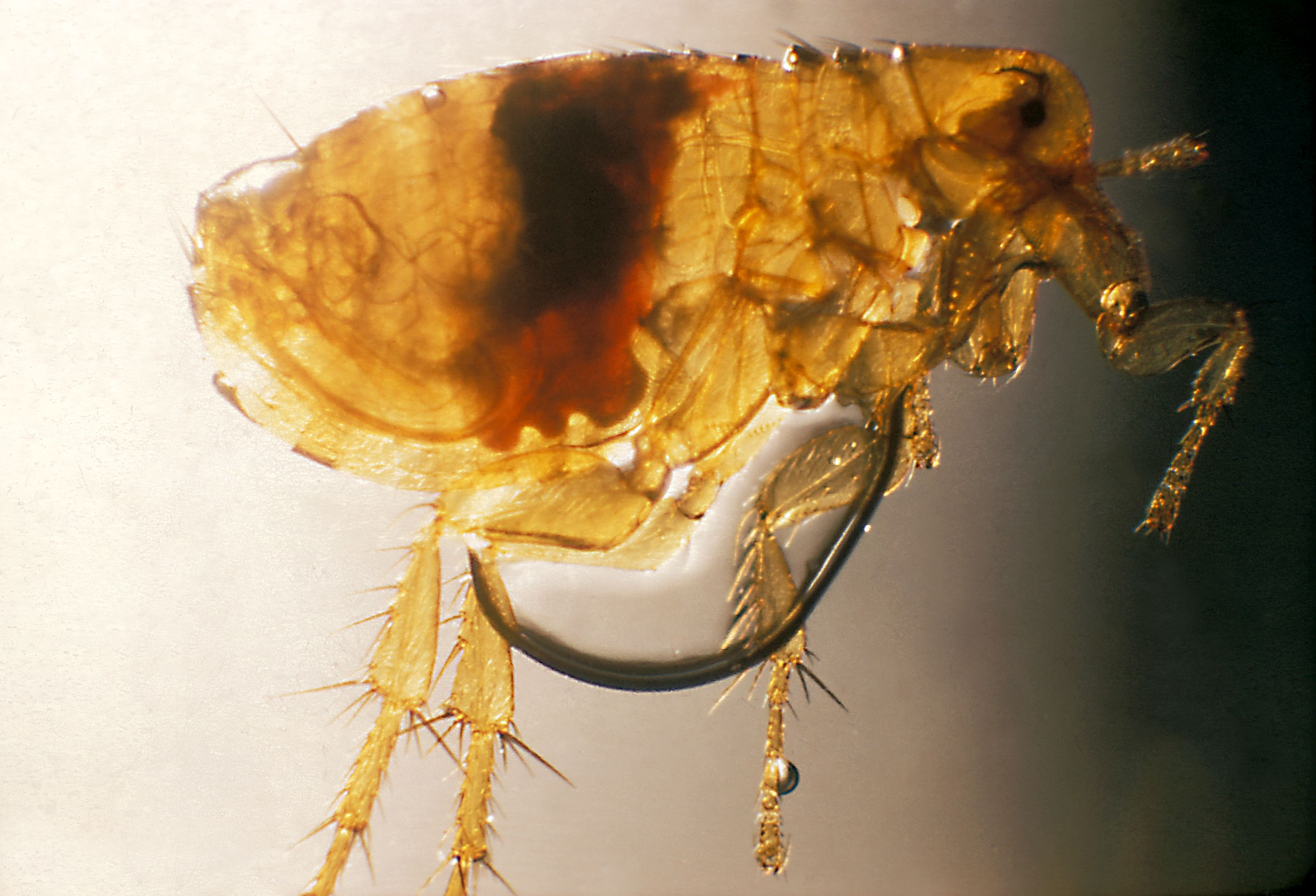

Scientific classification
- Kingdom: Animalia
- Phylum: Arthropoda
- Clade: Pancrustacea
- Class: Insecta
- Order: Siphonaptera
- Family: Pulicidae
- Genus: Xenopsylla
- Species: X. cheopis

Binomial name
- Xenopsylla cheopis (Rothschild, 1903)

= Oriental rat flea =

Species of flea

The Oriental rat flea (Xenopsylla cheopis), also known as the tropical rat flea or the rat flea, is a parasite of rodents, primarily of the genus Rattus, and is a primary vector for plague and murine typhus. This occurs when a flea that has fed on an infected rodent bites a human, although the flea can live on any warm blooded mammal.

== Body structure ==
The Oriental rat flea has no genal or pronotal combs. This characteristic can be used to differentiate the Oriental rat flea from the cat flea, dog flea, and other fleas. The flea's body is about one tenth of an inch long (about 2.5 mm). Its body is constructed to make it easier to jump long distances. The flea's body consists of three regions: head, thorax, and abdomen. The head and the thorax have rows of bristles (called combs), and the abdomen consists of eight visible segments. A flea's mouth has two functions: one for squirting saliva or partly digested blood into the bite, and one for sucking up blood from the host. This process mechanically transmits pathogens that may cause diseases it might carry. Fleas smell exhaled carbon dioxide from humans and animals and jump rapidly to the source to feed on the newly found host. The flea is wingless so it can not fly, but it can jump long distances with the help of small, powerful legs. A flea's leg consists of four parts: the part that is closest to the body is the coxa; next are the femur, tibia, and tarsus. A flea can use its legs to jump up to 200 times its own body length (about 20 in or 50 cm).

== Life cycle ==
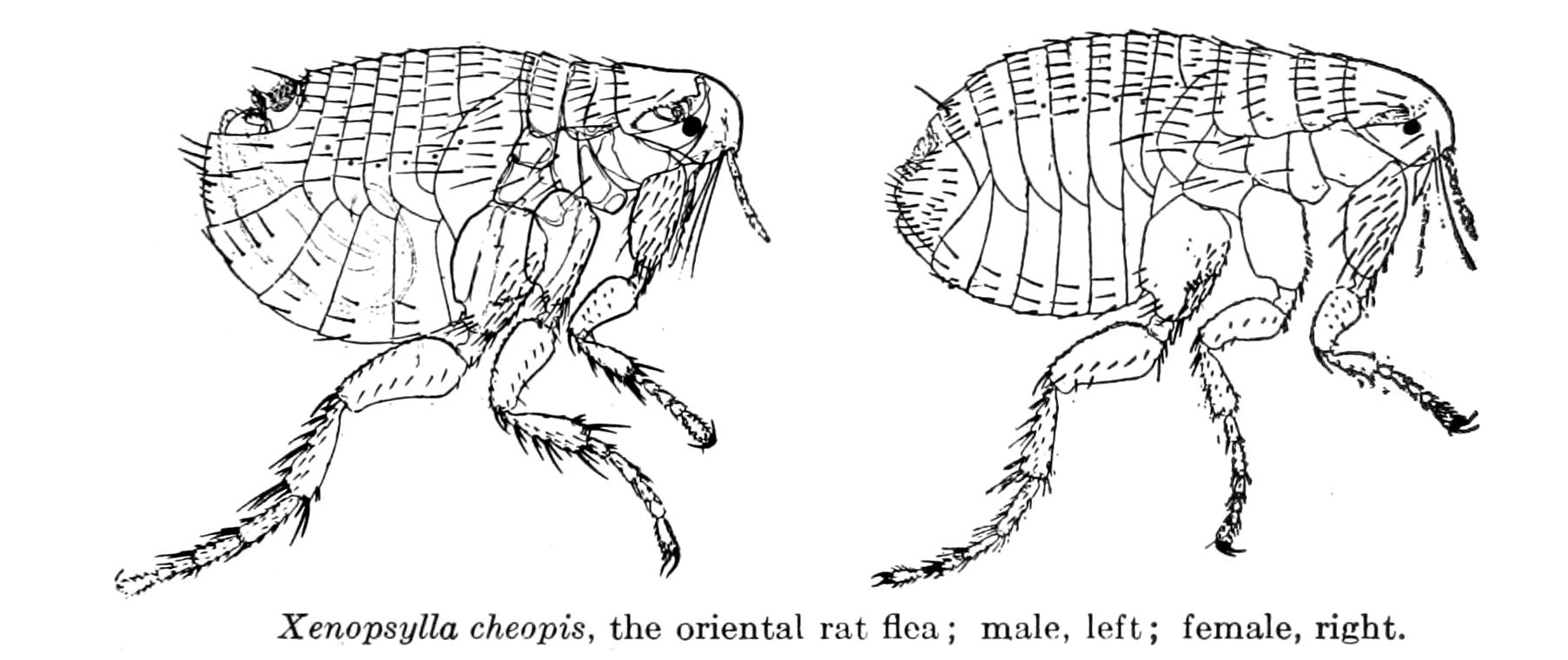
Male and female Xenopsylla cheopis

There are four stages in a flea's life. The first stage is the egg stage. Microscopic white eggs fall easily from the female to the ground or from the animal she lays on. If they are laid on an animal, they soon fall off in the dust or in the animal's bedding. If the eggs do fall immediately on the ground, then they fall into crevices on the floor where they will be safe until they hatch one to ten days later (depending on the environment that they live in, it may take longer to hatch). They hatch into a larva that looks very similar to a worm and is about two millimeters long. It only has a small body and a mouth part. At this stage, the flea does not drink blood; instead it eats dead skin cells, flea droppings, and other smaller parasites lying around them in the dust. When the larva is mature it makes a silken cocoon around itself and pupates. The flea remains a pupa from one week to six months changing in a process called metamorphosis. When the flea emerges, it begins the final cycle, called the adult stage. A flea can now suck blood from hosts and mate with other fleas. A single female flea can mate once and lay eggs every day with up to 50 eggs per day.

Experimentally, it has been shown that the fleas flourish in dry climatic conditions with temperatures of 20–25 °C (68–77 °F), they can live up to a year and can stay in the cocoon stage for up to a year if the conditions are not favourable.

== History ==
The Oriental rat flea was collected in Shendi, Sudan by Charles Rothschild along with Karl Jordan and described in 1903. He named it cheopis after the Cheops pyramids.

== Disease transmission ==
X. cheopis is the primary vector of Yersinia pestis (causative agent of plague) and Rickettsia typhi (causative agent of murine typhus) in tropical and subtropical countries. X. cheopis also acts as a host for the tapeworms Hymenolepis diminuta and Hymenolepis nana. Diseases can be transmitted from one generation of fleas to the next through the eggs.

== Hosts ==
The definitive host of X. cheopis is the Norwegian rat; however, X. cheopis can feed on humans, dogs, cats, chickens, and house mice amongst other hosts if there is a lack of rats to feed on.

== Gallery ==
Images of Xenopsylla cheopis
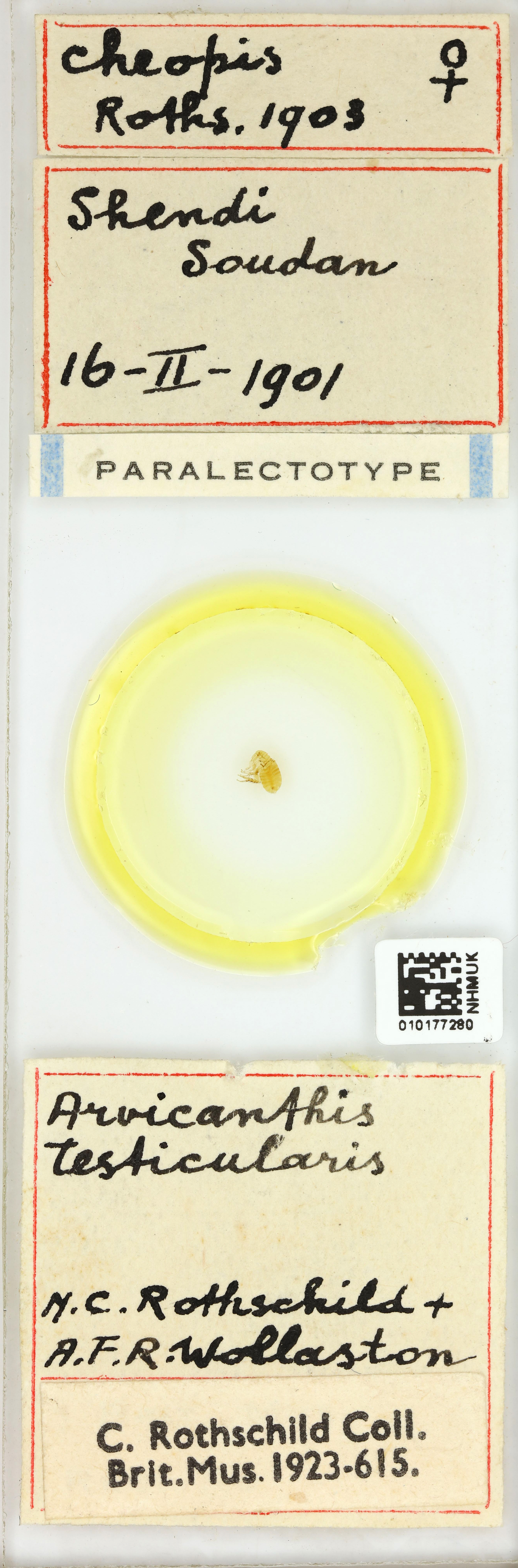
A whole slide image of the plague flea

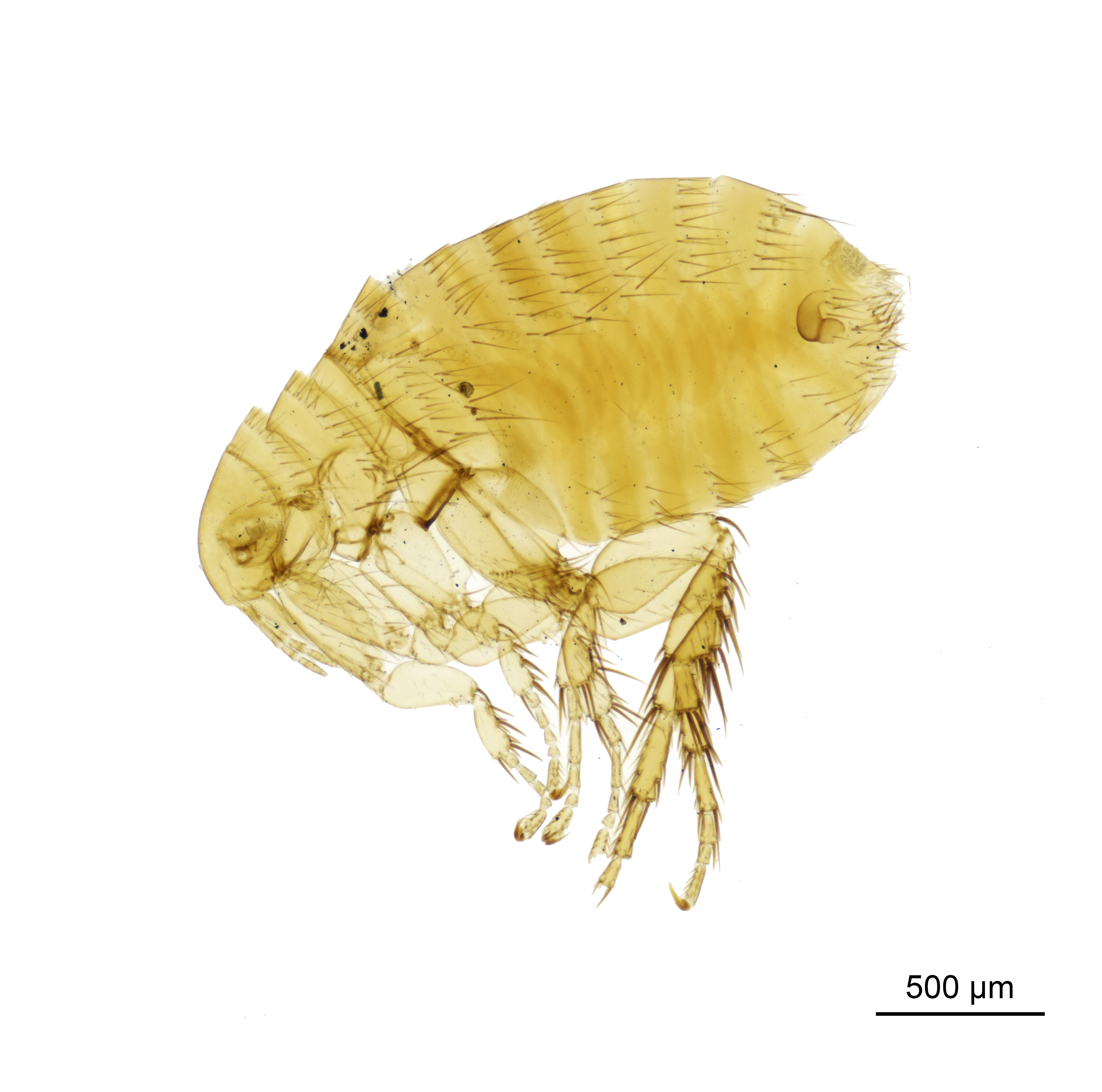
Close-up of a female slide-mounted plague flea

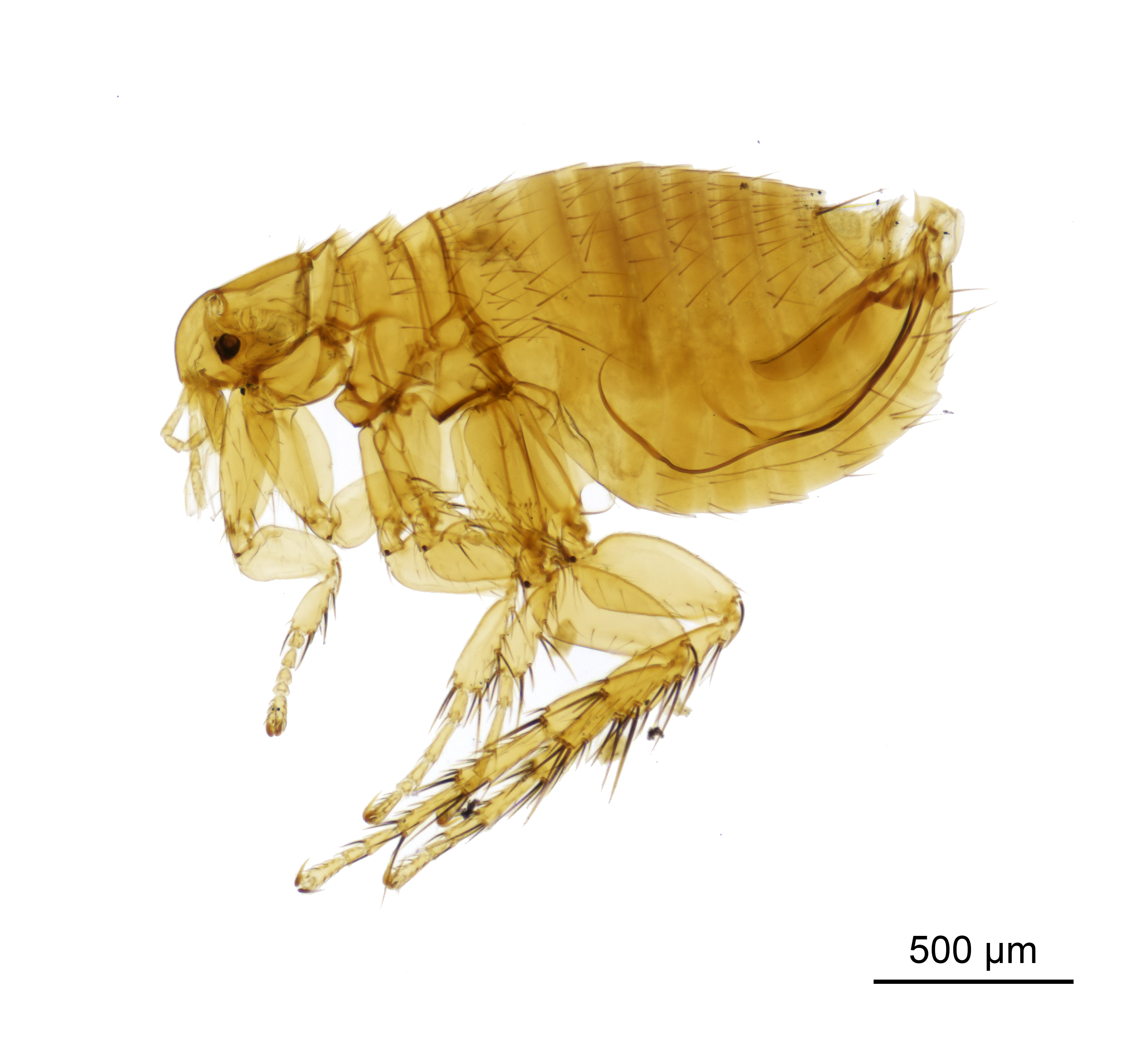
Close-up of a male slide-mounted plague flea
