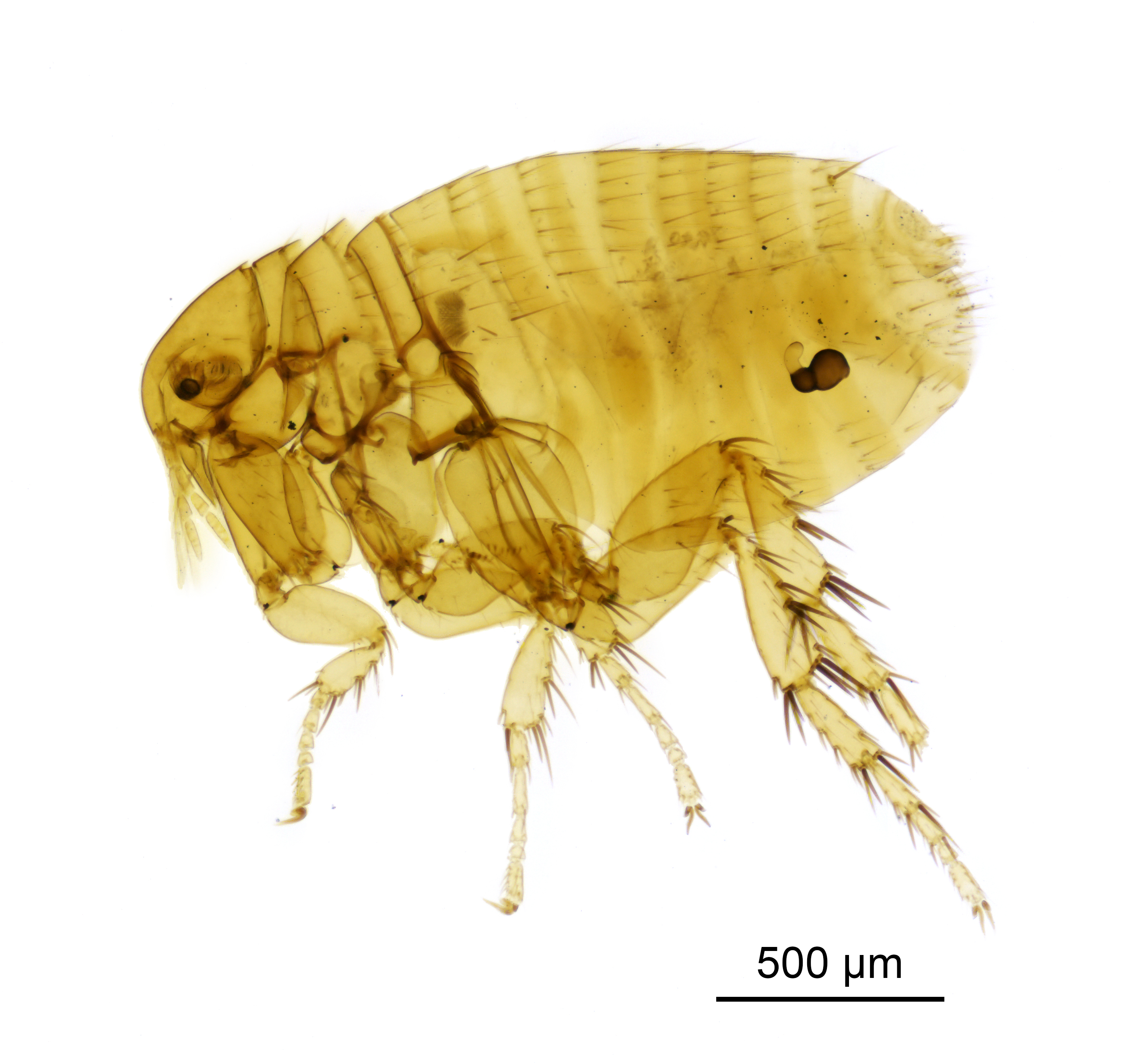
- Female rat flea

Scientific classification
- Domain: Eukaryota
- Kingdom: Animalia
- Phylum: Arthropoda
- Class: Insecta
- Order: Siphonaptera
- Family: Pulicidae
- Genus: Xenopsylla
- Species: X. brasiliensis

Binomial name
- Xenopsylla brasiliensis (Baker, 1904)

= Xenopsylla brasiliensis =

Species of flea

Xenopsylla brasiliensis is a species of flea found on rats. It is a vector of bubonic plague, and is found in South America, Africa, and India.
