= Spilopsyllinae =

Scientific classification
- Domain: Eukaryota
- Kingdom: Animalia
- Phylum: Arthropoda
- Class: Insecta
- Order: Siphonaptera
- Family: Pulicidae
- Subfamily: Spilopsyllinae; Oudemans, 1909

Genera
- Actenopsylla; Cediopsylla; Euchoplopsyllus (also spelt Euhoplopsyllus); Hoplopsyllus; Ornithopsylla; Spilopsyllus

Subfamily of fleas

The Spilopsyllinae form a flea subfamily (or depending on classifications a tribe called the Spilopsyllini) in the family Pulicidae.
