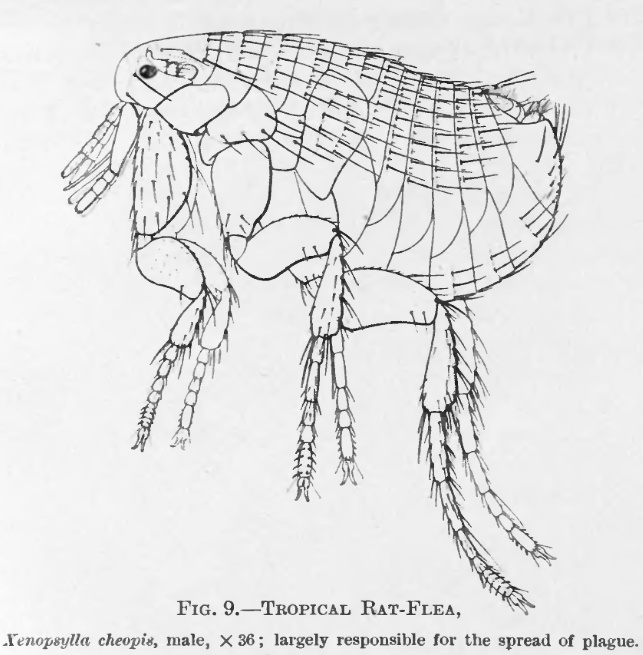
- Xenopsylla cheopis, the Oriental rat flea

Scientific classification
- Kingdom: Animalia
- Phylum: Arthropoda
- Clade: Pancrustacea
- Class: Insecta
- Order: Siphonaptera
- Family: Pulicidae
- Subfamily: Xenopsyllinae
- Genus: Xenopsylla; Glinkiewicz 1907

Species
- X. acomydis X. brasiliensis X. cheopis X. conformis X. cunicularis X. gratiosa X. guancha X. magdalinae X. ramensis X. vexabilis

= Xenopsylla =

Genus of fleas

Xenopsylla is a flea genus in the family Pulicidae.
