= Hedgehog flea =

Scientific classification
- Kingdom: Animalia
- Phylum: Arthropoda
- Clade: Pancrustacea
- Class: Insecta
- Order: Siphonaptera
- Family: Pulicidae
- Subfamily: Archaeopsyllinae
- Genus: Archaeopsylla; Bouché, 1835
- Species: A. erinacei

Binomial name
- Archaeopsylla erinacei Bouché, 1835

Species of flea

The hedgehog flea (Archaeopsylla erinacei) is a flea species which, as indicated by its common name, is an external parasite specifically adapted to living with the European hedgehog and the North African hedgehog, but it has also been found on other animals. It is the only member of the genus Archaeopsylla.

== Description ==
Named in 1835 by Peter Friedrich Bouché, A. erinacei is a common flea "found on every hedgehog, usually in large numbers". A typical number of fleas on a hedgehog is about a hundred, but up to a thousand have been reported on sick animals. The flea is occasionally found also on dogs and cats, but only temporarily, and has been known to cause allergic dermatitis in dogs. It has also been found on foxes. The flea's length is between 2 and 3.5 millimetres, and its food is the blood of the host.

=== Reproduction ===
The flea's reproductive cycle is closely connected with that of the host species. The female breeds only in the nest of a breeding hedgehog, and this is probably prompted by host hormones, as in the case of the rabbit flea, Spilopsyllus cuniculi.

The female flea lays eggs in the host's nesting material. Once hatched, larvae feed on faeces, which include dried blood, and on other material in the nest, then pupate, and adult fleas emerge from the pupae after several days, with variations which depend on temperature and other factors. The lifecycle can be repeated in weeks.

=== Range ===
The species is most commonly found on hedgehogs in western and northern Europe, including the British Isles, but it is also established in hedgehog populations in other European countries, including the Czech Republic, Croatia, Greece, and Ukraine, and in North Africa.

European hedgehogs are an invasive exotic species in New Zealand, but exceptionally the population there is entirely without the hedgehog flea. The fleas probably did not survive the long journey by sea from Europe.

The subspecies A. e. maura is the common stenoxenous flea of the North African hedgehog in the western Mediterranean regions of North Africa, from Morocco to Libya, and on the Mediterranean coast of Spain.

== Diseases ==
A. erinacei is the only flea known to be implicated in the zoonotic cycle of Boutonneuse fever.

== Subspecies ==
- A. e. erinacei Bouché, 1835
- A. e. maura Jordan & Rothschild, 1912

== Taxonomy ==
- Catalogue of Life, Archaeopsylla erinacei (Bouché, 1835)
- Fauna Europaea, Archaeopsylla erinacei
