= Moeopsyllini =

Scientific classification
- Kingdom: Animalia
- Phylum: Arthropoda
- Class: Insecta
- Order: Siphonaptera
- Family: Pulicidae
- Tribe: Moeopsyllini; Cheetham, 1988

Genera
- Moeopsylla

Tribe of fleas

The Moeopsyllini form a flea tribe in the family Pulicidae.
