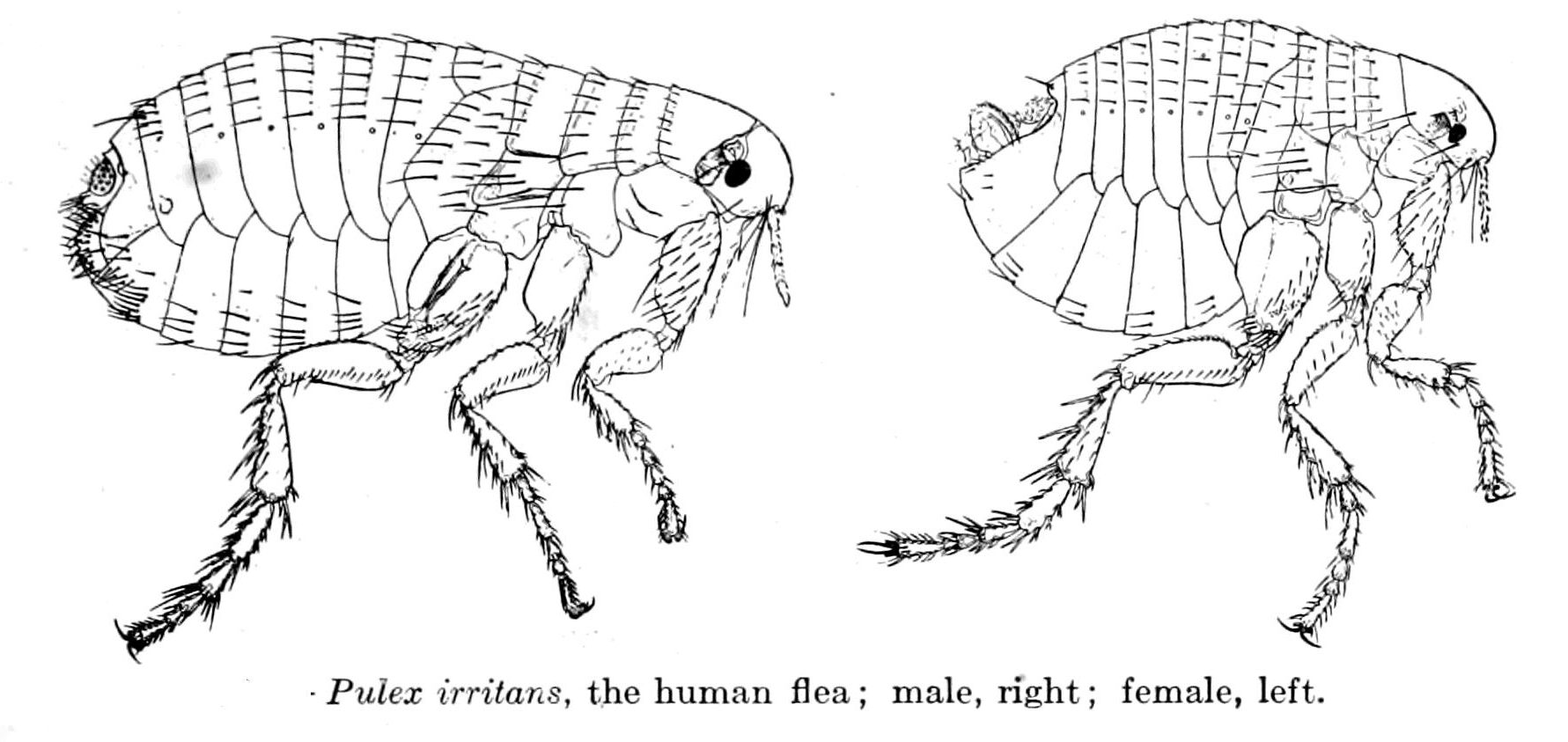
- female (left), male (right)

Scientific classification
- Kingdom: Animalia
- Phylum: Arthropoda
- Clade: Pancrustacea
- Class: Insecta
- Order: Siphonaptera
- Family: Pulicidae
- Genus: Pulex
- Species: P. irritans

Binomial name
- Pulex irritans Linnaeus, 1758

= Human flea =

Species of flea

The human flea (Pulex irritans) – once also called the house flea – is a cosmopolitan flea species that has, in spite of the common name, a wide host spectrum. It is one of six species in the genus Pulex; the other five are all confined to the Nearctic and Neotropical realms. The species is thought to have originated in South America, where its original host may have been the guinea pig or peccary.

== Morphology and behavior ==
Pulex irritans is a holometabolous insect with a four-part lifecycle consisting of eggs, larvae, pupae, and adults. Eggs are shed by the female in the environment and hatch into larvae in about 3–4 days. Larvae feed on organic debris in the environment. Larvae eventually form pupae, which are in cocoons that are often covered with debris from the environment (sand, pebbles, etc.). The larval and pupal stages are completed in about 3–4 weeks when the adults hatch from pupae, then must seek out a warm-blooded host for blood meals.

Adults lack genal and pronotal ctenidia.

The flea eggs are about 0.5 mm in length. They are oval-shaped and pearly white in color. Eggs are often laid on the body of the host, but they often fall off in many different places. The larvae are about 0.6 mm in length. They are creamy white or yellow in color. Larvae have 13 segments with bristles on each segment. The larvae feed on a variety of organic debris. The pupa are around 4 x 2 mm. After undergoing three separate molts, the larvae pupate, then emerge as adults. If conditions are unfavorable, a cocooned flea can remain dormant for up to a year in the pupal phase. The adults are roughly 1.5 to 4 mm in length and are laterally flattened. They are dark brown in color, are wingless, and have piercing-sucking mouthparts that aid in feeding on the host's blood. Both genal and pronotal combs are absent and the adult flea has a rounded head. Most fleas are distributed in the egg, larval, or pupal stages.

== Host species ==
The most common hosts for P. irritans are carnivores and less occasionally pigs. Humans are not frequently parasitised in the developed world.

== Relationship with host ==
=== Direct effects of bites ===
Fleas are a pest species to their hosts, causing an itching sensation that results in discomfort and leads to scratching in the vicinity of the bite. Flea bites generally cause the skin to raise, swell, and itch. The bite site has a single puncture point in the center. Bites often appear in clusters or small rows and can remain inflamed for up to several weeks.

This species bites many species of mammals and birds, including domesticated ones. It has been found on dogs and wild canids, monkeys in captivity, opossums, domestic cats, wild felids in captivity, chickens, black rats and Norwegian rats, wild rodents, pigs, free-tailed bats, and other species. It can also be an intermediate host for the flea tapeworm cestode Dipylidium caninum.

Fleas can spread rapidly and move between areas to include eyebrows, eyelashes, and pubic regions.

Hair loss as a result of itching is common, especially in wild and domestic animals. Anemia is also possible in extreme cases of high-volume infestations.

=== Vector capabilities ===
Plague, a disease that affects humans and other mammals, is caused by the bacterium Yersinia pestis. The human flea can be a carrier of the plague bacterium, although it is an exceptionally poor vector of transmission. P. irritans is likely to have been the main vector for plague epidemics in Northern Europe due to the Oriental rat flea having poor survival in cool climates.

== Treatment and prevention ==
Common treatments include body shaving and medicated shampoos and combing. When preventing fleas, it is important to treat both the host and the environment. Household pets should be treated to prevent being infested. Carpets, and other floor surfaces, should be shampooed and vacuumed regularly to prevent fleas. When dealing with an infestation, bedding and clothing that may have been exposed should be washed thoroughly in hot water and kept away from other materials that have not been exposed. In extreme cases, extermination by a professional is necessary.

== Phylogeny and distribution ==
Pulex irritans originated in Central and South America, where it evolved with only one host. Despite the origins of P. irritans, it is now a cosmopolitan species, most likely due to the fur trade after the 18th century, and pet transport in more recent decades. Due to the cosmopolitan distribution of this group, research has been conducted to show that P. irritans individuals, when sampled from Spain and Argentina, only showed significant differences when comparing molecular data. The use of morphometric data, which is often the method for flea identification, showed no significant levels of divergence between the two populations. Combining both morphological and molecular data has identified the possibility of cryptic species. This indicates a need to reconsider taxonomic classifications of these fleas. Studies in Europe and the Mediterranean also found this to be true. Human and cat fleas from Europe and the Mediterranean were studied and show such great variation within their own species that their taxonomy should be reevaluated based on mitochondrial gene heterogeneity.
