= Timms trap =

Device used to capture and kill animals

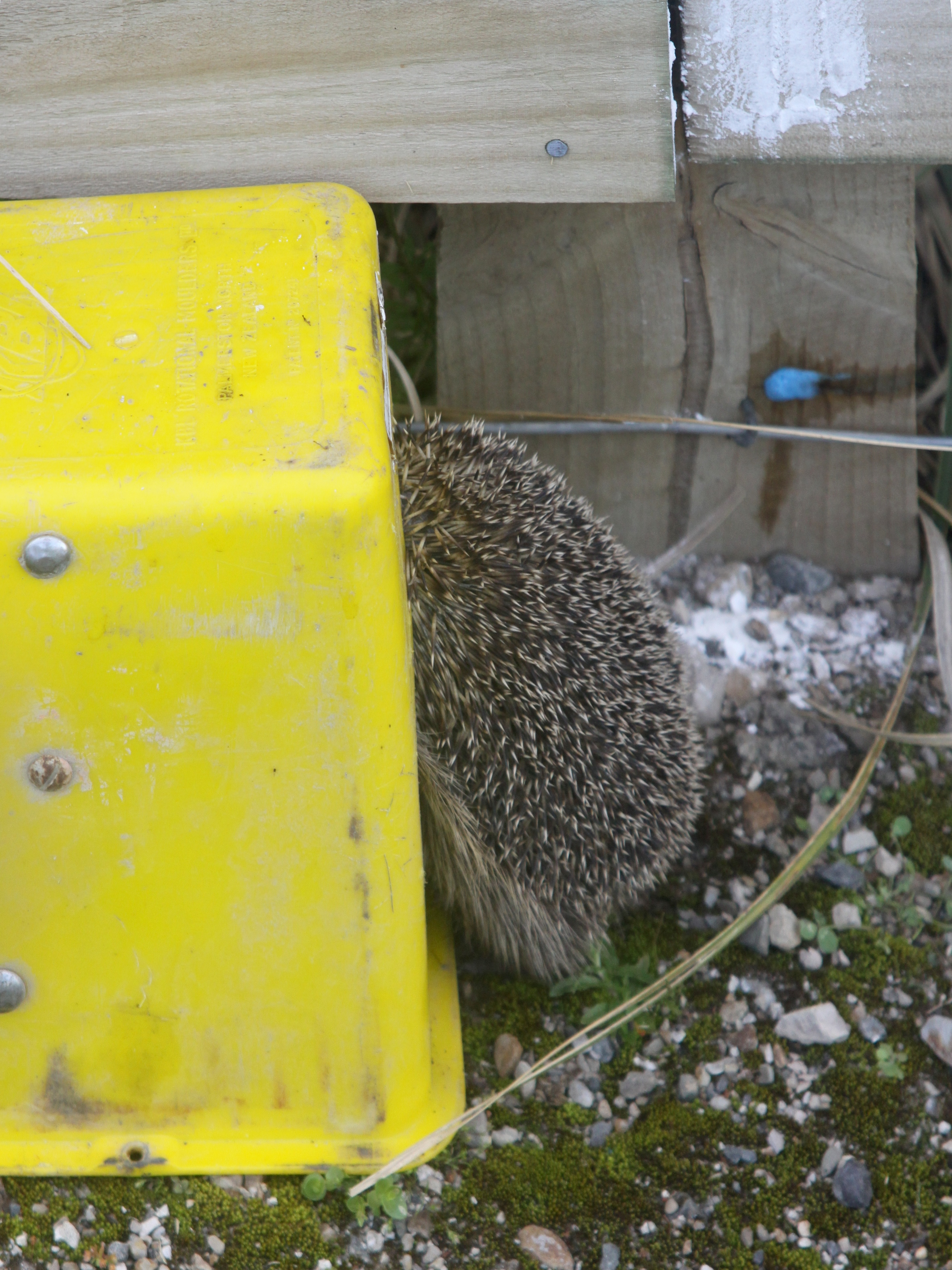
Hedgehog caught in a Timms trap

A Timms trap is a device used to capture and kill common brushtail possums. Their use is commonplace in New Zealand, where the possum is an introduced pest. In Australia, where the possum is a protected native species, the trap uses a spring-loaded metal mouth to break the neck of the animal, resulting in a rapid and humane death. It requires baiting with fresh fruit in order to attract a pest, which inserts its head through the hole at the front, springing the trap.

A Timms trap, as a form of kill trap, is inexpensive, and simple to use, and provides an effective means of pest control for gardens and similar-sized areas. The use of fruit as bait reduces the likelihood that a pet, such as a cat, will be caught.
