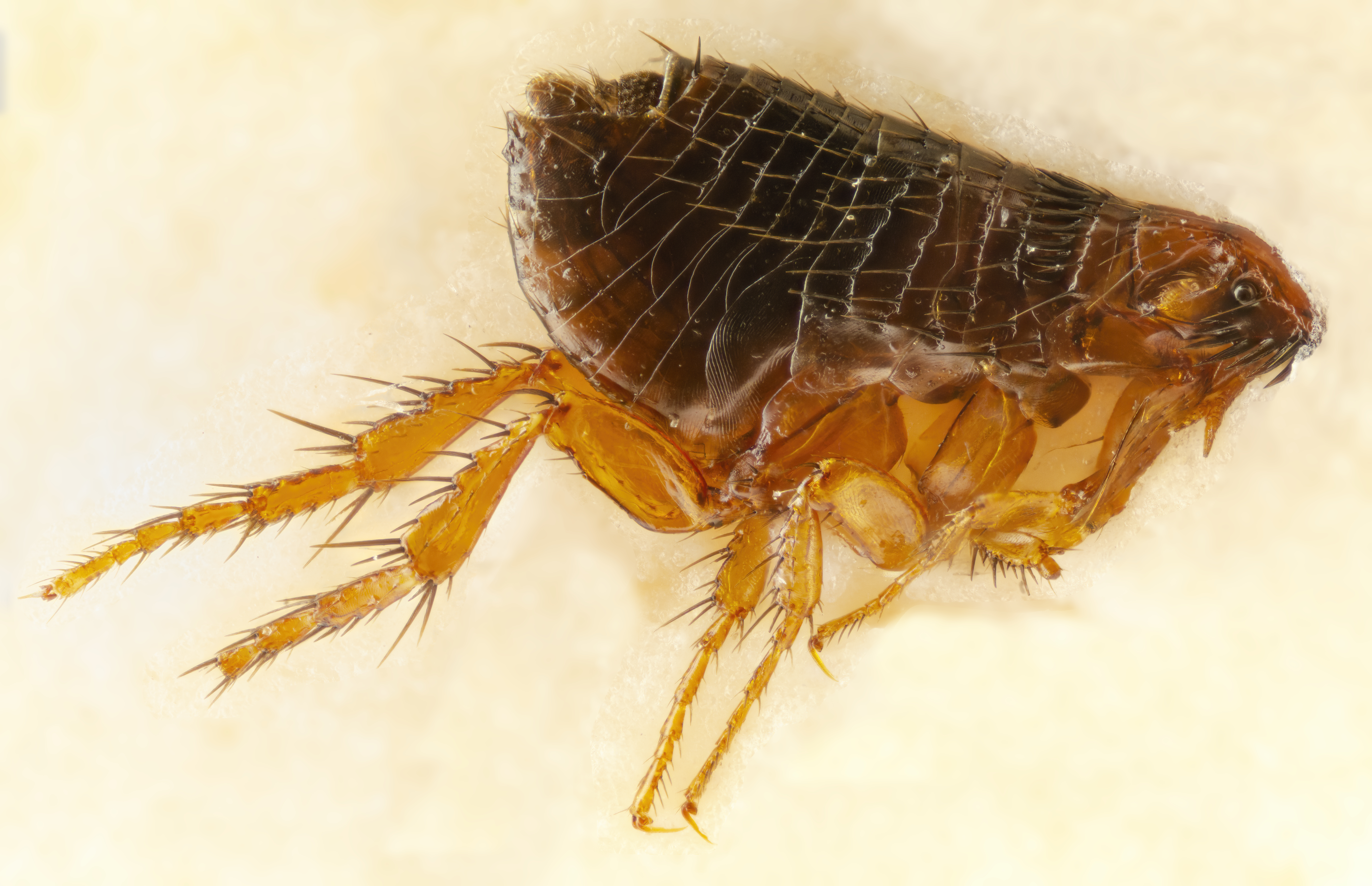

Conservation status
- Least Concern (IUCN 3.1)

Scientific classification
- Kingdom: Animalia
- Phylum: Arthropoda
- Clade: Pancrustacea
- Class: Insecta
- Order: Siphonaptera
- Family: Pulicidae
- Genus: Ctenocephalides
- Species: C. canis

Binomial name
- Ctenocephalides canis (Curtis, 1826)

= Dog flea =

Species of flea

The dog flea (Ctenocephalides canis) is a species of flea that lives as an ectoparasite on a wide variety of mammals, particularly the domestic dog and cat. It closely resembles the cat flea (Ctenocephalides felis), which can live on a wider range of animals and is generally more prevalent worldwide.

The dog flea is of veterinary importance because it can spread Dipylidium caninum.

Although they feed on the blood of dogs and cats, they sometimes bite humans. They can live without food for several months, but females must have a blood meal before they can produce eggs. They can deliver about 4,000 eggs on the host's fur. The eggs go through four lifecycle stages: embryo, larva, pupa, and imago (adult). This whole life cycle from egg to adult takes from two to three weeks, although this depends on the temperature. It may take longer in cool conditions.

== Anatomy ==
The dog flea's mouthparts are adapted for piercing skin and sucking blood. Dog fleas are external parasites, living by hematophagy off the blood of dogs. The dog often experiences severe itching in all areas where the fleas may reside.

Fleas do not have wings and their hard bodies are compressed laterally and have hairs and spines, which makes it easy for them to travel through hair. They have relatively long hind legs for jumping.

The dog flea can be distinguished from the very similar cat flea by its head, which is anteriorly rounded rather than elongate, and the tibiae of its hind legs, which exhibit eight setae-bearing notches rather than six.

== Signs and symptoms ==
Flea infestations can be not only annoying for both dogs and cats and humans, but also very dangerous. Problems caused by fleas may range from mild to severe itching and discomfort to skin problems and infections. Anemia may also result from flea bites in extreme circumstances. Furthermore, fleas can transmit tapeworms and diseases to pets.

When fleas bite humans, they may develop an itching rash with small bumps that may bleed. This rash is usually located on the armpit or fold of a joint such as the elbow, knee, or ankle. When the area is pressed, it turns white.

When dogs are troubled by fleas, they scratch and bite themselves, especially in areas such as the head, neck, and around the tail. Fleas normally concentrate in such areas. This incessant scratching and biting may cause the dog's skin to become red and inflamed. This is easily noticeable when the fur has been parted and the dog's skin is exposed.

Flea allergy dermatitis is developed by dogs allergic to flea saliva. In this case, the symptom previously mentioned are more pronounced. Because of compulsive scratching and biting, the dog may lose hair, get bald spots, exhibit hot spots due to extreme irritation, and develop infections that result in smelly skin.

== Treatment and prevention ==
Preventing and controlling flea infestations is a multi-step process. Prevention in the case of flea infestations can sometimes be difficult, but is the most effective way to ensure the dog will not get reinfected. Controlling flea infestations implies not only the pet has been cured and the fleas living on it are killed, but environment in which the pet lives is free of these parasites. Of all these, removing the fleas from the pet may be the easiest and simplest step given the many products especially designed to kill fleas available on the market.

Every female flea on the pet is likely to have laid eggs in the environment in which the pet lives. Therefore, effective prevention and control of flea infestations involves the removal of the fleas from both indoor and outdoor environments, from all pets, and not allowing immature forms of fleas to develop.

Removing the fleas in indoor environments consists of removing them mechanically. This can be done by a thorough vacuuming, especially in places where fleas are more likely to be found, such as below drapes, the place where the pet sleeps, and under furniture edges. Vacuuming can remove an estimated 50% of flea eggs. After vacuuming, using a specially designed product is recommended to kill the remaining fleas and to stop the development of eggs and larvae. The products available on the market may include carpet powders, sprays or foggers, which contain adult insecticides and insect growth regulators.

Special attention should be paid to the dog's bedding. This should be washed every week; also the bed and surrounding areas should be treated with adult insecticides and insect growth regulators. Cleaning should be done at the same time in the cars, garage, pet carrier, basement, or any other place where the dog is known to spend time.

Preventing flea infestations must include eliminating the parasites from the yard or kennel areas, the two places where fleas are most likely to live. Dog houses, patios or porches are some of the outdoor areas in which it is more likely to find fleas and those should be thoroughly cleaned. Fleas can also be carried by wild animals, such as opossums, chipmunks, and raccoons. One is recommended to discourage these wild animals from their property and pets by never feeding them.

Flea-control products are available in once-a-month topicals, dog collars, sprays, dips, powders, shampoos, and injectable and oral products. Many of these products contain an insecticide as an active ingredient which kills the adult fleas when coming into contact with them. Fleas absorb the insecticide which either paralyzes them or kills them. Other products do not target adult fleas at all, but instead prevent the flea eggs from hatching, thus breaking the life cycle.

A very important part of flea prevention is to persist with the same control measures for as long as possible. Though the initial cleaning process may be thorough, fleas in incipient stages likely still exist around the house or on the pet. The life cycle of fleas can take up to one year, so maintaining the prevention measures for as long as half a year is recommended.

== Epidemiology ==
Historically, the dog flea was the predominant flea for dogs worldwide. Since the early 21st century, the cat flea has supplanted the dog flea as the predominant flea found on dogs in the developed world. The dog flea remains predominant in the developing world.
