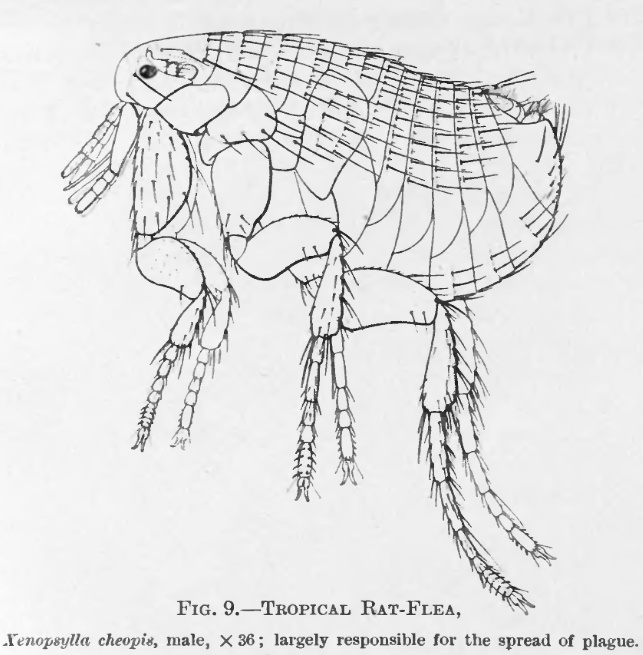
- Xenopsylla cheopis, the Oriental rat flea

Scientific classification
- Kingdom: Animalia
- Phylum: Arthropoda
- Class: Insecta
- Order: Siphonaptera
- Superfamily: Pulicoidea
- Family: Pulicidae; Billberg, 1820

Subfamilies
- Archaeopsyllinae; Pulicinae; Spilopsyllinae; Xenopsyllinae; Pulicidae incertae sedis; Moeopsyllini; Parapulex

= Pulicidae =

Family of fleas

The Pulicidae are a flea family in the order Siphonaptera. Currently, this family has 181 species in 27 genera. Of these, 16 are known from North America.

Like all 2,500 Siphonaptera, the Pulicidae are ectoparasites. These fleas are wingless, laterally flattened, and great jumpers. They must be able to jump quickly and at great relative heights in order to latch onto their host for feeding and for rapid escape from their host. They make incredible jumps using the protein, resilin. It charges the energy in their body, allowing more forceful and frequent jumps than would be possible relying on only their muscles. This also means that they can jump frequently without exhausting their muscles. They mainly feed on mammal blood, and many Siphonoptera families, including Pulicidae, transmit disease.

== Ecology ==
Pulicidae feed on mammalian blood. Ctenocephalides felis felis is also known as the cat flea, and is an extremely important parasite of domestic cats and dogs. They prefer to feed on areas round the head and neck of a cat, rather than the ventral part of the body. The transmission of dog tapeworm is a result of this flea, as well. As for their effect on humans, they are also responsible for flea bite allergy dermatitis. Additionally, Pulicidae transmit Yersinia pestis, the bacteria responsible for plague.
