= Zika fever =

Infectious disease caused by the Zika virus

- Other names: Zika virus disease, Zika, Zika virus infection
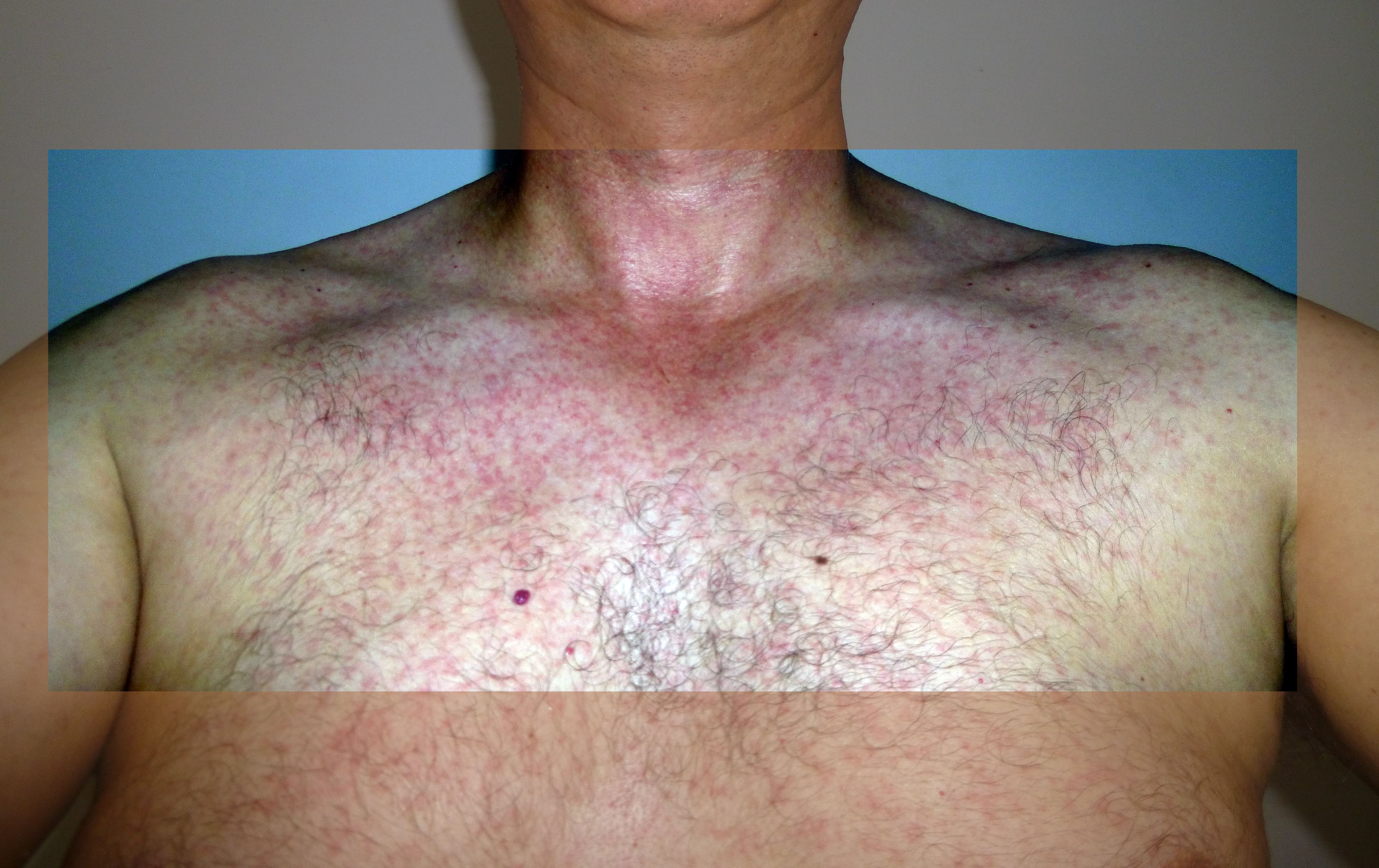
- Rash during Zika fever infection
- Pronunciation: Zika /ˈziːkə/
- Specialty: Infectious disease
- Symptoms: Fever, red eyes, joint pain, headache, maculopapular rash; some cases asymptomatic
- Complications: Guillain–Barré syndrome, during pregnancy can cause microcephaly in the baby
- Duration: Short-term
- Causes: Zika virus mainly spread by mosquitoes, can also be sexually transmitted
- Diagnostic method: Testing blood, urine, or saliva for viral RNA or blood for antibodies
- Differential diagnosis: Chikungunya, malaria, dengue, leptospirosis, measles
- Prevention: Permethrin, DEET, picaridin, male condoms
- Treatment: Supportive care, Generally not needed in mild cases
- Deaths: ≥ 51 (2016–19)

Zika fever, also known as Zika virus disease or simply Zika, is an infectious disease caused by the Zika virus. Most cases have no symptoms, but when present they are usually mild and can resemble dengue fever. Symptoms may include fever, red eyes, joint pain, headache, and a maculopapular rash. Symptoms generally last less than seven days. It has not caused any reported deaths during the initial infection. Mother-to-child transmission during pregnancy can cause microcephaly and other brain malformations in some babies. Infections in adults have been linked to Guillain–Barré syndrome (GBS).

Zika fever is mainly spread via the bite of mosquitoes of the Aedes type. It can also be sexually transmitted and potentially spread by blood transfusions. Infections in pregnant women can spread to the baby. Diagnosis is by testing the blood, urine, or saliva for the presence of the virus's RNA when the person is sick, or the blood for antibodies after symptoms are present more than a week.

Prevention involves decreasing mosquito bites in areas where the disease occurs and proper condom use. Efforts to prevent bites include the use of insect repellent, covering much of the body with clothing, mosquito nets, and getting rid of standing water where mosquitoes reproduce. There is no effective vaccine. Health officials recommended that women in areas affected by the 2015–16 Zika outbreak consider putting off pregnancy and that pregnant women not travel to these areas. While there is no specific treatment, paracetamol (acetaminophen) may help with the symptoms. Hospital admission is rarely necessary.

The virus that causes the disease was first isolated in Africa in 1947. The first documented outbreak among people occurred in 2007 in the Federated States of Micronesia. An outbreak started in Brazil in 2015, and spread to the Americas, Pacific, Asia, and Africa. This led the World Health Organization to declare it a Public Health Emergency of International Concern in February 2016. The emergency was lifted in November 2016, but 84 countries still reported cases as of March 2017. The last proven case of Zika spread in the Continental United States was in 2017.

== Signs and symptoms ==
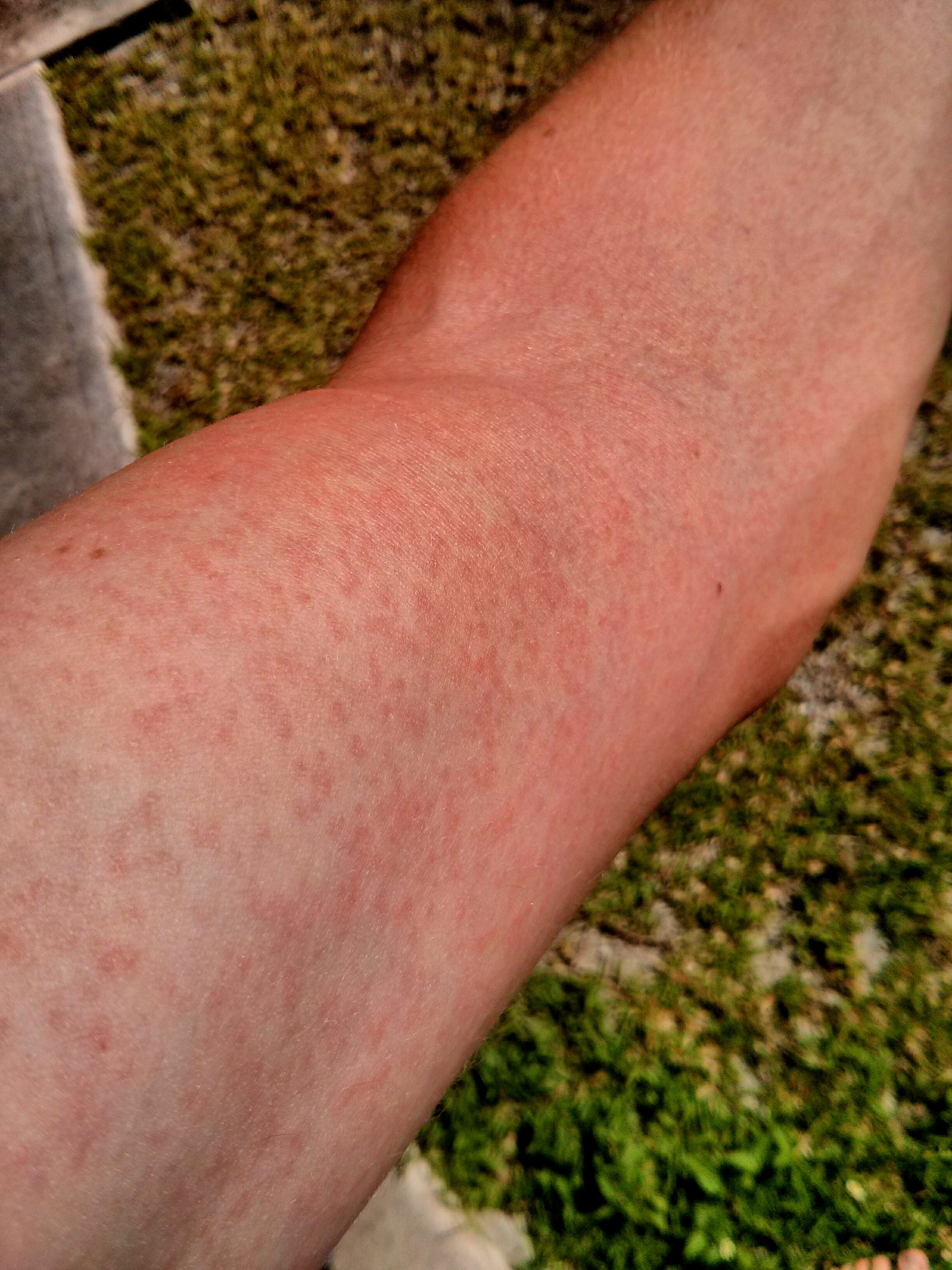
Rash on an arm due to Zika fever

Most people who are infected have no or few symptoms. Otherwise the most common signs and symptoms of Zika fever are fever, rash, conjunctivitis (red eyes), muscle and joint pain, and headache, which are similar to signs and symptoms of dengue and chikungunya fever. The time from a mosquito bite to developing symptoms is not yet known, but is probably a few days to a week. The disease lasts for several days to a week. It is usually mild enough for people not to go to a hospital.

Due to being in the same family as dengue, there has been concern that it could cause similar bleeding disorders. However that has only been documented in one case, with blood seen in semen, also known as hematospermia.

=== Guillain–Barré syndrome ===
Zika virus infections have been strongly associated with Guillain–Barré syndrome (GBS), which is a rapid onset of muscle weakness caused by the immune system damaging the peripheral nervous system, and which can progress to paralysis. While both GBS and Zika infection can simultaneously occur in the same individual, it is difficult to definitively identify Zika virus as the cause of GBS. Though Zika virus has been shown to infect human Schwann cells. Several countries affected by Zika outbreaks have reported increases in the rate of new cases of GBS. During the 2013–2014 outbreak in French Polynesia, there were 42 reported cases of GBS over three months, compared to between 3 and 10 annually before the outbreak.

=== Pregnancy ===
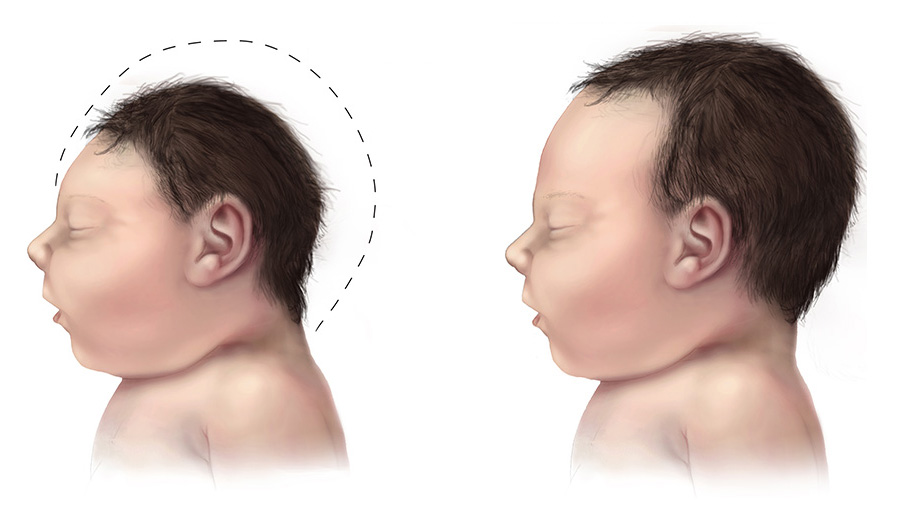
Microcephaly

The disease spreads from mother to child in the womb and can cause multiple problems, most notably microcephaly, in the baby. The full range of birth defects caused by infection during pregnancy is not known, but they appear to be common, with large-scale abnormalities seen in up to 42% of live births. The most common observed associations have been abnormalities with brain and eye development such as microcephaly and chorioretinal scarring. Less commonly there have been systemic abnormalities such as hydrops fetalis, where there is abnormal accumulation of fluid in the fetus. These abnormalities can lead to intellectual problems, seizures, vision problems, hearing problems, problems feeding and slow development.

Whether the stage of pregnancy at which the mother becomes infected affects the risk to the fetus is not well understood, nor is whether other risk factors affect outcomes. One group has estimated the risk of a baby developing microcephaly at about 1% when the mother is infected during the first trimester, with the risk of developing microcephaly becoming uncertain beyond the first trimester. Affected babies might appear normal but actually have brain abnormalities; infection in newborns could also lead to brain damage.

== Cause ==
=== Reservoir ===
Zika virus is a mosquito-borne flavivirus closely related to the dengue and yellow fever viruses. While mosquitoes are the vector, the main reservoir species remains unknown, though serological evidence has been found in both West African monkeys and rodents.

=== Transmission ===
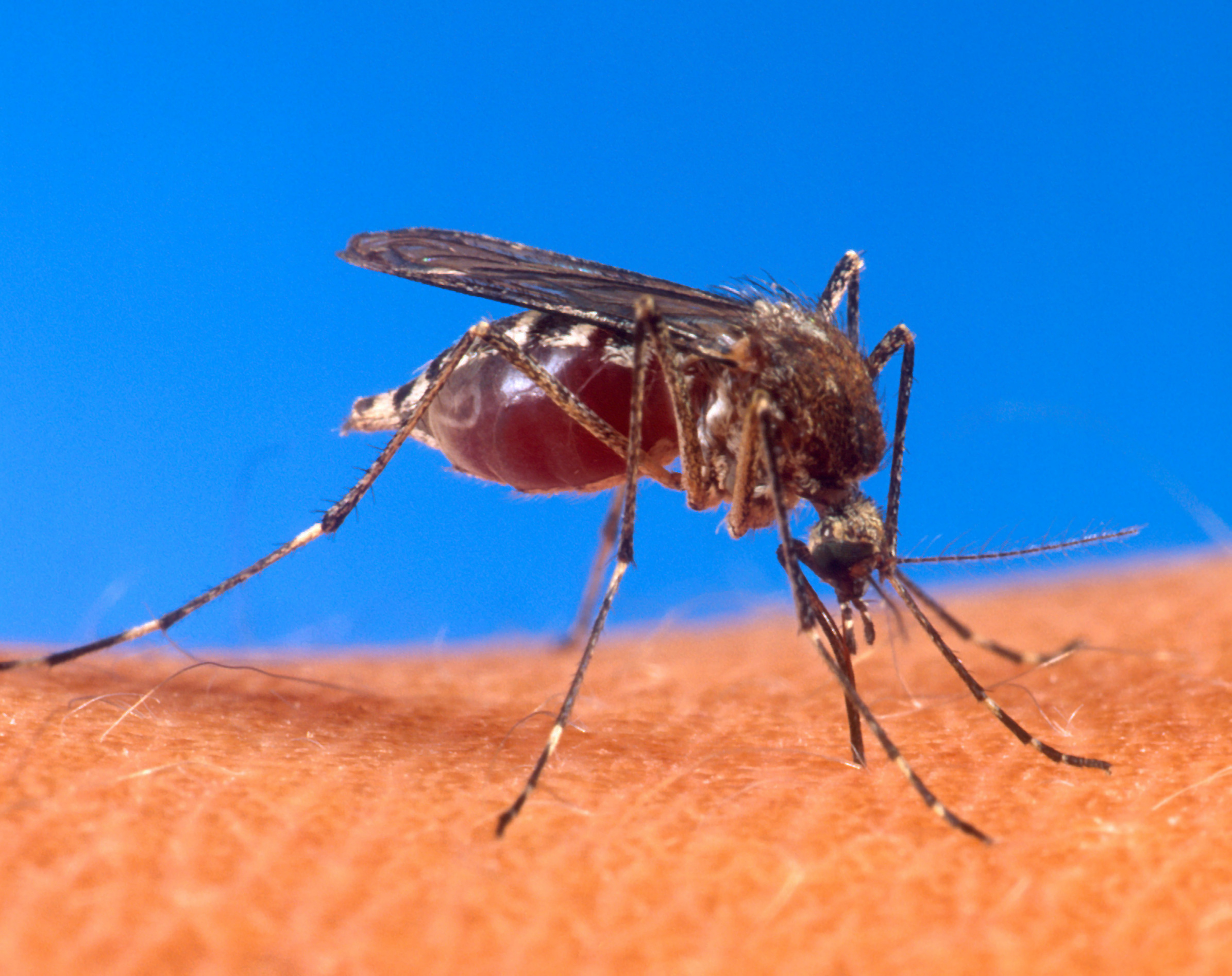
Aedes aegypti, a Zika disease vector, biting a human.

Transmission is via the bite of mosquitoes from the genus Aedes, primarily Aedes aegypti in tropical regions. It has also been isolated from Ae. africanus, Ae. apicoargenteus, Ae. luteocephalus, Ae. albopictus, Ae. vittatus and Ae. furcifer. During the 2007 outbreak on Yap Island in the South Pacific, Aedes hensilli was the vector, while Aedes polynesiensis spread the virus in French Polynesia in 2013.

Zika virus can also spread by sexual transmission from infected men to their partners. Zika virus has been isolated from semen samples, with one person having 100,000 times more virus in semen than blood or urine, two weeks after being infected. It is unclear why levels in semen can be higher than other body fluids, and it is also unclear how long infectious virus can remain in semen. There have also been cases of men with no symptoms of Zika virus infection transmitting the disease. The CDC has recommended that all men who have travelled to affected areas should wait at least 6 months before trying to attempt conception, regardless of whether they were ill. To date, there have been no reported sexual transmissions from women to their sexual partners. Oral, anal, or vaginal sex can spread the disease.

Cases of vertical perinatal transmission have been reported. The CDC recommends that women with Zika fever wait at least 8 weeks after they start having symptoms of the disease before attempting to conceive. There have been no reported cases of transmission from breastfeeding, but infectious virus has been found in breast milk.

Like other flaviviruses, it could potentially be transmitted by blood transfusion, and several affected countries have developed strategies to screen blood donors. The U.S. FDA has recommended universal screening of blood products for Zika. The virus is detected in 3% of asymptomatic blood donors in French Polynesia.

It is predicted that climate change will expose more than 1.3 billion new people to Zika by 2050, largely due to the expansion of habitats conducive to mosquito vector growth and life cycles, particularly areas with temperatures ranging from 23.9 °C to 34 °C.

== Pathophysiology ==
In fruit flies, microcephaly appears to be caused by the flavivirid virus protein NS4A, which can disrupt brain growth by hijacking a pathway that regulates the growth of new neurons.

== Diagnosis ==
It is difficult to diagnose Zika virus infection based on clinical signs and symptoms alone due to overlaps with other arboviruses that are endemic to similar areas. The US Centers for Disease Control and Prevention (CDC) advises that "based on the typical clinical features, the differential diagnosis for Zika virus infection is broad. In addition to dengue, other considerations include leptospirosis, malaria, rickettsia, group A streptococcus, rubella, measles, and parvovirus, enterovirus, adenovirus, and alphavirus infections (e.g., chikungunya, Mayaro, Ross River, Barmah Forest, O'nyong'nyong, and Sindbis viruses)."

In small case series, routine chemistry and complete blood counts have been normal in most patients. A few have been reported to have mild leukopenia, thrombocytopenia, and elevated liver transaminases.

Zika virus can be identified by reverse transcriptase PCR (RT-PCR) in acutely ill patients. However, the period of viremia can be short and the World Health Organization (WHO) recommends RT-PCR testing be done on serum collected within 1 to 3 days of symptom onset or on saliva samples collected during the first 3 to 5 days. When evaluating paired samples, Zika virus was detected more frequently in saliva than serum. Urine samples can be collected and tested up to 14 days after the onset of symptoms, as the virus has been seen to survive longer in the urine than either saliva or serum. The longest period of having a detectable level of the virus has been 11 days, and the Zika virus does not appear to establish latency.

Later on, serology for the detection of specific IgM and IgG antibodies to the Zika virus can be used. IgM antibodies can be detectable within 3 days of the onset of illness. Serological cross-reactions with closely related flaviviruses such as dengue and West Nile virus as well as vaccines to flaviviruses are possible. As of 2019, the FDA has authorized two tests to detect Zika virus antibodies.

=== Screening in pregnancy ===
The CDC recommends screening some pregnant women even if they do not have symptoms of infection. Pregnant women who have traveled to affected areas should be tested between two and twelve weeks after their return from travel. Due to the difficulties with ordering and interpreting tests for Zika virus, the CDC also recommends that healthcare providers contact their local health department for assistance. For women living in affected areas, the CDC has recommended testing at the first prenatal visit with a doctor as well as in the mid-second trimester, though this may be adjusted based on local resources and the local burden of Zika virus. Additional testing should be done for any signs of Zika virus disease. Women with positive test results for Zika virus infection should have their fetus monitored by ultrasound every three to four weeks to monitor fetal anatomy and growth.

=== Infant testing ===
For infants with suspected congenital Zika virus disease, the CDC recommends testing with both serologic and molecular assays such as RT-PCR, IgM ELISA and plaque reduction neutralization test (PRNT). RT-PCR of the infant's serum and urine should be performed in the first two days of life. Newborns with a mother who was potentially exposed and who have positive blood tests, microcephaly or intracranial calcifications should have further testing including a thorough physical investigation for neurologic abnormalities, dysmorphic features, splenomegaly, hepatomegaly, and rash or other skin lesions. Other recommended tests are cranial ultrasound, hearing evaluation, and eye examination. Testing should be done for any abnormalities encountered as well as for other congenital infections such as syphilis, toxoplasmosis, rubella, cytomegalovirus infection, lymphocytic choriomeningitis virus infection, and herpes simplex virus. Some tests should be repeated up to 6 months later, as there can be delayed effects, particularly with hearing.

=== Infant feeding in areas of Zika virus transmission ===
In response to the widespread transmission of the Zika virus during the 2016 outbreak and concerns about viral genetic material detected in breast milk the World Health Organization (WHO) released a Guideline for infant feeding in areas of Zika virus transmission, first in 2016 and updated in 2021, where the evidence showed that despite the detection of Zika virus in breast milk, there is unclear evidence of transmission to the infant, and considering that Zika virus infection among infants is mild, the balance between desirable and undesirable effects favors breastfeeding versus not breastfeeding. According to the 2021WHO guidelines:

- Infants born to mothers with suspected, probable, or confirmed Zika virus infection or who reside in or have traveled to areas of ongoing Zika virus transmission should be fed according to normal infant feeding guidelines. They should start breastfeeding within one hour of birth, be exclusively breastfed for six months, and have a timely introduction of adequate, safe, and properly fed complementary foods while continuing breastfeeding up to two years of age or beyond.
- Infants fed with expressed breast milk from mothers with suspected, probable, or confirmed Zika virus infection or who reside in or have traveled to areas of ongoing Zika virus transmission should be fed according to normal infant feeding guidelines (strong recommendation, very-low certainty of evidence).
- Among infants (0–12 months) affected by complications associated with Zika virus infection, infant feeding practices should be modified (such as adjusting the environment, postural correction, or thickening feeds) to achieve and maintain optimal possible infant growth and development (strong recommendation, very- low certainty of evidence).
- Mothers and caregivers of infants affected by complications associated with Zika virus (such as feeding difficulties) should receive skilled support from health-care workers to initiate and sustain optimal infant feeding practices

== Prevention ==
The virus is spread by mosquitoes, making mosquito avoidance an important element of disease control. The CDC recommends that individuals:

- Cover exposed skin by wearing long-sleeved shirts and long pants treated with permethrin.
- Use an insect repellent containing DEET, picaridin, oil of lemon eucalyptus (OLE), or ethyl butylacetylaminopropionate (IR3535)
- Always follow product directions and reapply as directed
- If you are also using sunscreen, apply sunscreen first, let it dry, then apply insect repellent
- Follow package directions when applying repellent to children. Avoid applying repellent to their hands, eyes, or mouth
- Stay and sleep in screened-in or air-conditioned rooms
- Use a bed net if the area where you are sleeping is exposed to the outdoors
- Cover cribs, strollers, and carriers with mosquito netting for babies under 2 months old.

The CDC also recommends strategies for controlling mosquitoes, such as eliminating standing water, repairing septic tanks, and using screens on doors and windows. Spraying insecticide is used to kill flying mosquitoes and larvicide can be used in water containers.

Because Zika virus can be sexually transmitted, men who have gone to an area where Zika fever is occurring should be counseled to either abstain from sex or use condoms for 6 months after travel if their partner is pregnant or could potentially become pregnant. Breastfeeding is still recommended by the WHO, even by women who have had Zika fever. There have been no recorded cases of Zika transmission to infants through breastfeeding, though the replicative virus has been detected in breast milk.

When returning from travel, with or without symptoms, it is suggested that prevention of mosquito bites continue for 3 weeks to reduce the risk of virus transmission to uninfected mosquitoes.

=== CDC travel alert ===
Because of the "growing evidence of a link between Zika and microcephaly", in January 2016, the CDC issued a travel alert advising pregnant women to consider postponing travel to countries and territories with ongoing local transmission of Zika virus. Later, the advice was updated to caution pregnant women to avoid these areas entirely if possible and, if travel is unavoidable, to protect themselves from mosquito bites. Male partners of pregnant women and couples contemplating pregnancy who must travel to areas where Zika is active are advised to use condoms or abstain from sex. The agency also suggested that women thinking about becoming pregnant should consult with their physicians before traveling.

In September 2016, the CDC travel advisories included:

- Cape Verde
- Many parts of the Caribbean: Anguilla, Antigua and Barbuda, Aruba, The Bahamas, Barbados, Bonaire, British Virgin Islands, Cayman Islands, Cuba, Curaçao, Dominica, Dominican Republic, Grenada, Guadeloupe, Haiti, Jamaica, Martinique, Puerto Rico, Saba, Saint Saint Barthélemy, Saint Lucia, Saint Martin, Saint Vincent and the Grenadines, Sint Eustatius, Sint Maarten, Trinidad and Tobago, and the U.S. Virgin Islands
- Central America: Belize, Costa Rica, El Salvador, Guatemala, Honduras, Nicaragua, and Panama
- Mexico
- Most of South America: Argentina, Bolivia, Brazil, Colombia, Ecuador, French Guiana, Guyana, Paraguay, Peru, Suriname, and Venezuela
- Several Pacific Islands: American Samoa, Fiji, Marshall Islands, Micronesia, New Caledonia, Papua New Guinea, Samoa, and Tonga
- In Asia: Singapore, Malaysia, Brunei

In December 2020, no active Zika outbreaks were reported by the CDC.

=== WHO response ===
Both the regional Pan American Health Organization (PAHO) as well as the WHO have issued statements of concern about the widespread public health impact of the Zika virus and its links to GBS and microcephaly. The WHO Director-General, Margaret Chan, issued a statement in February 2016 "declaring that the recent cluster of microcephaly cases and other neurological disorders reported in Brazil, following a similar cluster in French Polynesia in 2014, constitutes a Public Health Emergency of International Concern." The declaration allowed the WHO to coordinate international response to the virus as well as gave its guidance the force of international law under the International Health Regulations. The declaration was ended in November 2016.

=== Vaccine ===
As of 2016, there was no available vaccine. Development was a priority of the US National Institutes of Health (NIH), but officials stated that development of a vaccine could take years. To speed new drug development regulatory strategies were proposed by the WHO and NIH. Animal and early human studies were underway as of September 2016. As of December 2019, there were several vaccine candidates in various stages of development.

=== Mosquito control ===
Disease control in the affected countries currently centers around mosquito control. Several approaches are available for the management of Aedes aegypti mosquito populations, including the destruction of larval breeding sites (the aquatic pools in which eggs are laid and larvae hatch before mosquito development into flying adults); and, insecticides targeting either the larval stages, adult mosquitoes or both. Additionally, a whole host of novel technologies are under current development for mosquito control and the World Health Organization has recently lent its support for the accelerated development of modern methods for mosquito control such as the use of Wolbachia bacteria to render mosquitoes resistant to the virus, and, the release of sterilized male mosquitoes that breed with wild female mosquitoes to give rise to non-viable offspring (offspring that do not survive to the biting, adult stage).

Oxitec's genetically modified OX513A mosquito was approved by Brazil's National Biosecurity Technical Commission (CTNBio) in April 2014 and it was being used to try to combat mosquitoes carrying the Zika virus in the town of Piracicaba, São Paulo in 2016.

In the 1940s and 1950s, the Aedes aegypti mosquito was eradicated on some Caribbean islands and in at least eighteen Latin American countries. Decreasing political will and presumably available money, mosquito resistance to insecticide, and a pace of urbanization that exceeded eradication efforts led to this mosquito's comeback.

== Treatment ==
There is currently no specific treatment for Zika virus infection. Care is supportive with the treatment of pain, fever, and itching. Some authorities have recommended against using aspirin and other NSAIDs as these have been associated with hemorrhagic syndrome when used for other flaviviruses. Additionally, aspirin use is generally avoided in children when possible due to the risk of Reye syndrome.

Zika virus was poorly studied until the major outbreak in 2015, and no specific antiviral treatments are available as yet. Advice to pregnant women is to avoid any risk of infection so far as possible, as once infected, there is little that can be done beyond supportive treatment.

== Outcomes ==
Most of the time, Zika fever resolves on its own in two to seven days, but rarely, some people develop Guillain–Barré syndrome. The fetus of a pregnant woman who has Zika fever may die or be born with congenital central nervous system malformations, like microcephaly.

== Epidemiology ==
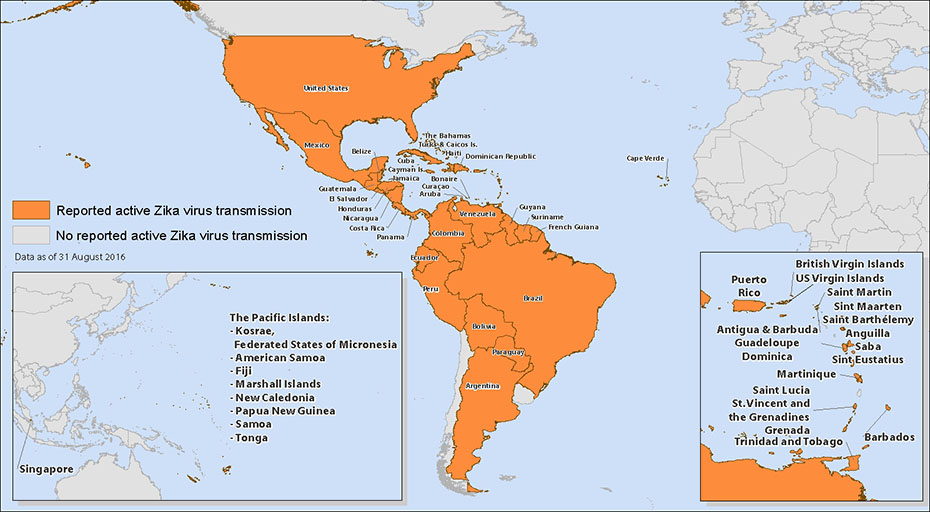
Countries with active Zika virus transmission as of September 2016

In April 1947, as part of studies sponsored by the Rockefeller Foundation into yellow fever, 6 caged rhesus monkeys were placed in the canopy of the Zika Forest of Uganda. On April 18 one of the monkeys (no. 776) developed a fever and blood samples revealed the first known case of Zika fever. Population surveys at the time in Uganda found 6.1% of individuals to be seropositive for Zika. The first human cases were reported in Nigeria in 1954. A few outbreaks have been reported in tropical Africa and some areas in Southeast Asia. Until recently there were no documented cases of Zika virus in the Indian subcontinent, however, the first cases were reported in 2017 from Gujarat state and Tamil Nadu, more cases were reported in Rajasthan state involving an outbreak of 153 reported cases and in a pregnant women living in Kerala state. A 1954 study assessing blood samples from several people from different states found antibodies to Zika in healthy people in India which could indicate past exposure, though it could also be due to cross-reaction with other flaviviruses.

By using phylogenetic analysis of Asian strains, it was estimated that Zika virus had moved to Southeast Asia by 1945. In 1977–1978, Zika virus infection was described as a cause of fever in Indonesia. Before 2007, there were only 13 reported natural infections with Zika virus, all with a mild, self-limited febrile illness. As of July 2019, evidence of local transmission from mosquitoes to humans has been reported in a total of 87 countries from four of six WHO Regions; African, Americas, South-East Asia and Western Pacific.

=== Yap Islands ===
The first major outbreak, with 185 confirmed cases, was reported in 2007 in the Yap Islands of the Federated States of Micronesia. A total of 108 cases were confirmed by PCR or serology, and 72 additional cases were suspected. The most common symptoms were rash, fever, arthralgia, and conjunctivitis, and no deaths were reported. The mosquito Aedes hensilli, which was the predominant species identified in Yap during the outbreak, was probably the main transmission vector. While the way of introduction of the virus on Yap Island remains uncertain, it is likely to have happened through the introduction of infected mosquitoes or a human infected with a strain related to those in Southeast Asia. This was also the first time Zika fever had been reported outside Africa and Asia. Before the Yap Island outbreak, only 14 human cases had ever been reported.

=== Oceania ===
In 2013–2014, several outbreaks of Zika were reported in French Polynesia, New Caledonia, Easter Island, and the Cook Islands. The source of the virus was thought to be an independent introduction of the virus from Southeast Asia, unrelated to the Yap Islands outbreak.

=== Americas ===
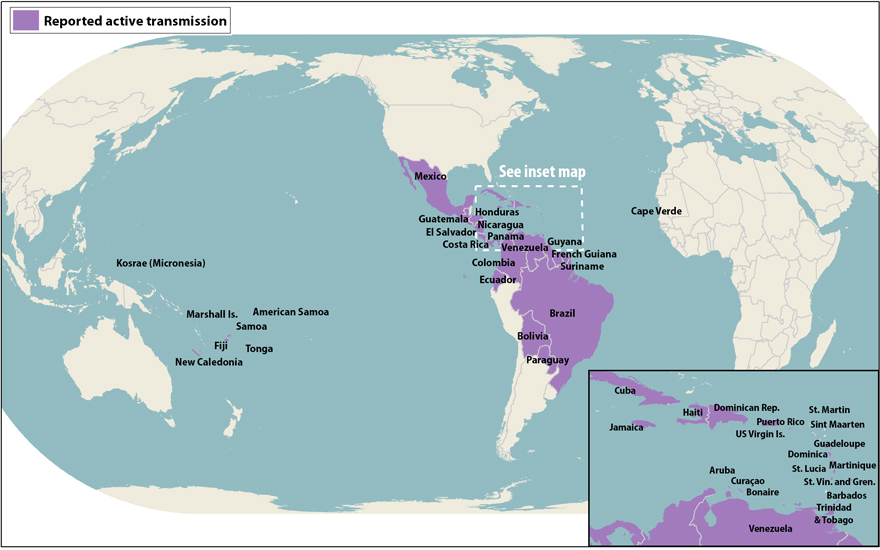
Areas of active Zika virus transmission, April 2016

Genetic analyses of Zika virus strains suggest that Zika first entered the Americas between May and December 2013. It was first detected in the Western Hemisphere in February 2014, and rapidly spread throughout South and Central America, reaching Mexico in November 2015. In 2016 it established local transmission in Florida and Texas. The first death in the United States due to Zika occurred in February 2016.

In May 2015, Brazil officially reported its first 16 cases of the illness. Although, a case of illness was reported in March 2015 in a returning traveller. According to the Brazilian Health Ministry, as of November 2015 there was no official count of the number of people infected with the virus in Brazil, since the disease is not subject to compulsory notification. Even so, cases were reported in 14 states of the country. Mosquito-borne Zika virus is suspected to be the cause of 2,400 possible cases of microcephaly and 29 infant deaths in Brazil in 2015 (of the 2400 or so notified cases in 2015, 2165 were under investigation in December 2015, 134 were confirmed, and 102 were ruled out for microcephaly).

The Brazilian Health Ministry has reported at least 2,400 suspected cases of microcephaly in the country in 2015 as of 12 December, and 29 fatalities. Before the Zika outbreak, only an average of 150 to 200 cases per year were reported in Brazil. In the state of Pernambuco the reported rates of microcephaly in 2015 are 77 times higher than in the previous 5 years. A model using data from a Zika outbreak in French Polynesia estimated the risk of microcephaly in children born to mothers who acquired Zika virus in the first trimester to be 1%.

On 24 January 2016, the WHO warned that the virus is likely to spread to nearly all countries of the Americas, since its vector, the mosquito Aedes aegypti, is found in all countries in the region, except for Canada and continental Chile. The mosquito and dengue fever have been detected in Chile's Easter Island, some 3,500 km (2,200 mi) away from its closest point in mainland Chile, since 2002.

In February 2016, WHO declared the outbreak a Public Health Emergency of International Concern as evidence grew that Zika is a cause of birth defects and neurological problems. In April 2016, WHO stated there is a scientific consensus, based on preliminary evidence, that Zika is a cause of microcephaly in infants and Guillain–Barré syndrome in adults. Studies of this and prior outbreaks have found Zika infection during pregnancy to be associated with early pregnancy loss and other pregnancy problems. In the Americas the number of cases peaked during the first half of 2016 and declined through 2017–2018, with a total of 31,587 suspected, probable, and confirmed cases of ZIKV disease were reported in the Region of the Americas. Of these, 3,473 (11%) were laboratory-confirmed. Transmission persists at low levels in some areas and is not uniformly distributed within countries.

=== Asia ===
In 2016, imported or locally transmitted Zika was reported in all the countries of Asia except Brunei, Hong Kong, Myanmar and Nepal. Serological surveys have indicated that Zika virus is endemic in most areas of Asia, though at a low level. While there was a sharp rise in the number of cases of Zika detected in Singapore after the 2016 Summer Olympics in Brazil, genetic analysis revealed that the strains were more closely related to strains from Thailand than from those causing the epidemic in the Americas.

== History ==
=== Origin of the name ===
It is named after the Zika Forest near Entebbe, Uganda, where the Zika virus was first identified.

=== Microcephaly and other infant disorders ===
Zika virus was first identified in the late 1940s in Kampala, Uganda, Africa, but was first confirmed in Brazil. Since it was first identified, Zika has been found in more than 27 countries and territories. Following the initial Zika outbreak in Northeastern Brazil in May 2015, physicians observed a tremendous surge of reports of infants born with microcephaly, with 20 times the number of expected cases. Many of these cases have since been confirmed, leading WHO officials to project that approximately 2,500 infants will be found to have been born in Brazil with Zika-related microcephaly.

Proving that Zika causes these effects was difficult and complex for several reasons. For example, the effects on an infant might not be seen until months after the mother's initial infection, long after the time when Zika is easily detected in the body. In addition, research was needed to determine the mechanism by which Zika produced these effects.

Since the initial outbreak, studies that use several different methods have found evidence of a link, leading public health officials to conclude that it appears increasingly likely the virus is linked to microcephaly and miscarriage. On 1 February 2016, the World Health Organization declared recently reported clusters of microcephaly and other neurological disorders a Public Health Emergency of International Concern (PHEIC). On 8 March 2016, the WHO Committee reconfirmed that the association between Zika and neurological disorders is of global concern.

The Zika virus was first linked with newborn microcephaly during the Brazilian Zika virus outbreak. In 2015, there were 2,782 suspected cases of microcephaly compared with 147 in 2014 and 167 in 2013. Confirmation of many of the recent cases is pending, and it is difficult to estimate how many cases went unreported before the recent awareness of the risk of virus infections.

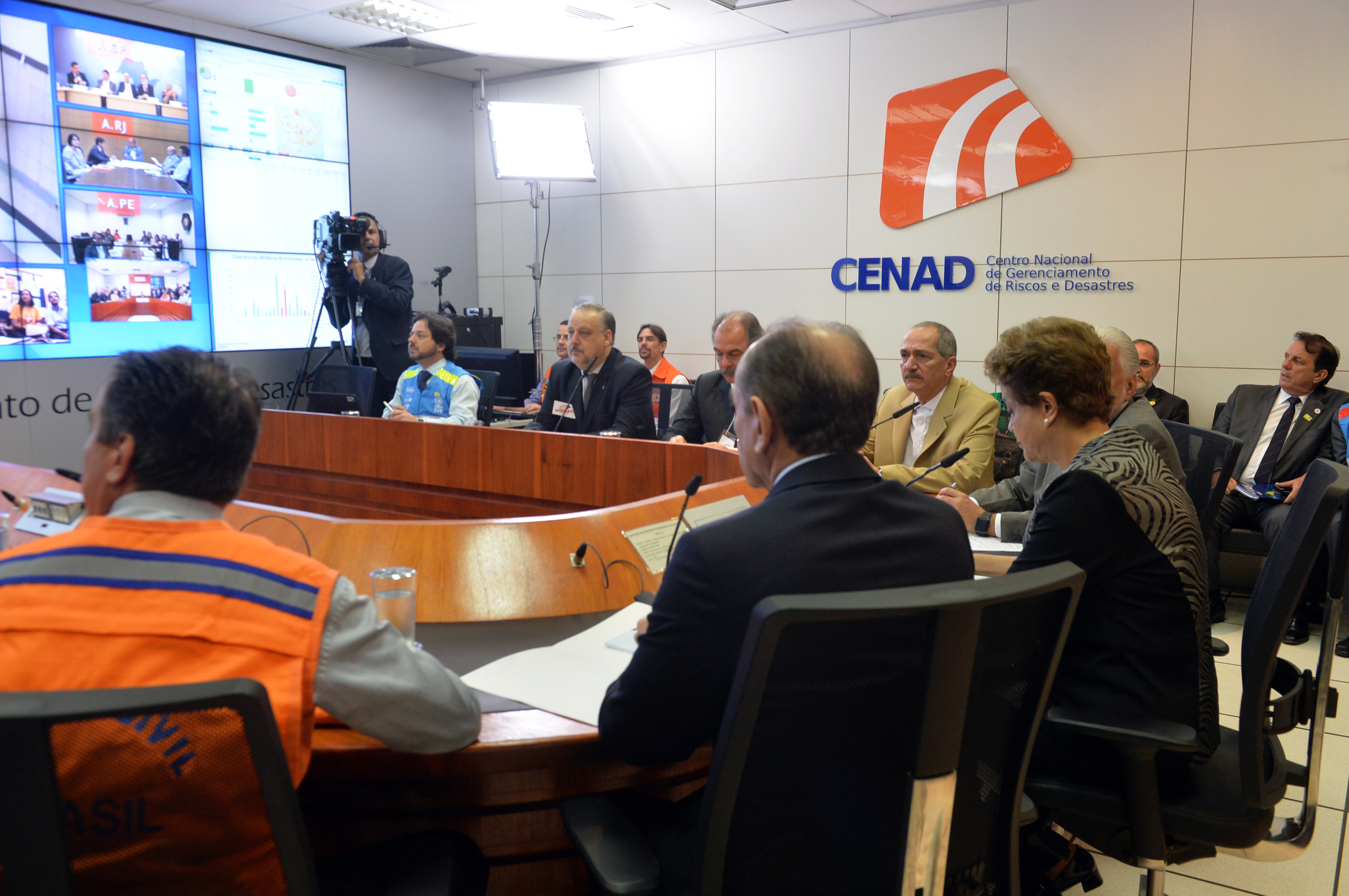
Brazilian President Dilma Rousseff in a videoconference about the Zika virus at the National Center for Disaster Management

In November 2015, the Zika virus was isolated in a newborn baby from the northeastern state of Ceará, Brazil, with microcephaly and other congenital disorders. The Lancet medical journal reported in January 2016 that the Brazilian Ministry of Health had confirmed 134 cases of microcephaly "believed to be associated with Zika virus infection" with an additional 2,165 cases in 549 counties in 20 states remaining under investigation. An analysis of 574 cases of microcephaly in Brazil during 2015 and the first week of 2016, reported in March 2016, found an association with maternal illness involving rash and fever during the first trimester of pregnancy. During this period, 12 Brazilian states reported increases of at least 3 standard deviations (SDs) in cases of microcephaly compared with 2000–14, with the northeastern states of Bahia, Paraíba and Pernambuco reporting increases of more than 20 SDs.

In January 2016, a baby in Oahu, Hawaii, was born with microcephaly, the first case in the United States of brain damage linked to the virus. The baby and mother tested positive for a past Zika virus infection. The mother, who had probably acquired the virus while traveling in Brazil in May 2015 during the early stages of her pregnancy, had reported her bout of Zika. She recovered before relocating to Hawaii. Her pregnancy had progressed normally, and the baby's condition was not known until birth.

In February 2016, ocular disorders in newborns have been linked to Zika virus infection. In one study in Pernambuco state in Brazil, about 40 percent of babies with Zika-related microcephaly also had scarring of the retina with spots, or pigment alteration. On 20 February 2016, Brazilian scientists announced that they had successfully sequenced the Zika virus genome and expressed hope that this would help in both developing a vaccine and in determining the nature of any link to birth defects.

Also in February 2016, rumors that microcephaly is caused by the use of the larvicide pyriproxyfen in drinking water were refuted by scientists. "It's important to state that some localities that do not use pyriproxyfen also had reported cases of microcephaly", read a Brazilian government statement. The Brazilian government also refuted conspiracy theories that chickenpox and rubella vaccinations or genetically modified mosquitoes were causing increases in microcephaly.

Researchers also suspected that the Zika virus could be transmitted by a pregnant woman to her baby ("vertical transmission"). This remained unproven until February 2016, when a paper by Calvet et al. was published, showing not only the Zika virus genome found in the amniotic fluid but also IgM antibodies against the virus. This means that not only can the virus cross the placental barrier, but also the antibodies produced by the mother can reach the fetus, which suggests that vertical transmission is plausible in these cases. One other study published in March 2016 by Mlakar and colleagues analyzed autopsy tissues from a fetus with microcephaly that was probably related to Zika virus; researchers found ZIKV in the brain tissue and suggested that the brain injuries were probably associated with the virus, which also shed light on the vertical transmission theory. Also in March 2016, first solid evidence was reported on how the virus affects the development of the brain, indicating that it appears to preferentially kill developing brain cells.

The first cases of birth defects linked to Zika in Colombia and in Panama were reported in March 2016. In the same month, researchers published a prospective cohort study that found profound impacts in 29 percent of infants of mothers infected with Zika, some of whom were infected late in pregnancy. This study did not suffer from some of the difficulties of studying Zika: the study followed women who presented to a Rio de Janeiro clinic with fever and rash within the last five days. The women were then tested for Zika using PCR, and then the progress of the pregnancies was followed using ultrasound.

=== Guillain–Barré syndrome ===
A high rate of the autoimmune disease Guillain–Barré syndrome (GBS), noted in the French Polynesia outbreak, has also been found in the outbreak that began in Brazil. Laboratory analysis found Zika infections in some patients with GBS in Brazil, El Salvador, Suriname, and Venezuela, and the WHO declared on 22 March 2016 that Zika appeared to be "implicated" in GBS infection and that if the pattern was confirmed it would represent a global public health crisis.

== Research ==
=== Mechanism ===
Early in the 2015–16 Zika virus epidemic, research was begun to understand how the Zika virus causes microcephaly and other neurological disorders. However, with the 2019 election of Jair Bolsonaro in Brazil, who cut funding for research, and the emergence of the COVID-19 pandemic in early 2020, most Zika-related research projects were abandoned or reduced.

It may involve infection of the primary neural stem cells of the fetal brain, known as neural progenitor cells. The main roles of brain stem cells are to proliferate until the correct number is achieved, and then to produce neurons through the process of neurogenesis. Zika proteins NS4A and NS4B have also been shown to directly suppress neurogenesis. Infection of brain stem cells can cause cell death, which reduces the production of future neurons and leads to a smaller brain. Zika also appears to have an equal tropism for cells of the developing eye, leading to high rates of eye abnormalities as well.

In addition to inducing cell death, infection of neural progenitor cells may alter the process of cell proliferation, causing a depletion in the pool of progenitor cells. A large number of cases of microcephaly have been associated with inherited gene mutations, and specifically with mutations that lead to dysfunction of the mitotic spindle. There is some evidence that the Zika virus may directly or indirectly interfere with mitotic function, which may play a role in altering cell proliferation.

Another line of research considers that Zika, unlike other flaviviruses, may target developing brain cells after it crosses the placenta, and considers the resulting damage likely to be the result of inflammation as a byproduct of the immune response to the infection of those cells.

=== Mosquito control ===
Some experimental prevention methods include breeding and releasing mosquitoes that have been genetically modified to prevent them from transmitting pathogens, or have been infected with the Wolbachia bacterium, believed to inhibit the spread of viruses. A strain of Wolbachia helped to reduce the vector competence of the Zika virus in infected Aedes aegypti released in Medellin, Colombia.

Gene drive is a technique for changing wild populations, for instance to combat insects so they cannot transmit diseases (in particular mosquitoes in the cases of malaria and Zika). Another method which been researched aims to render male mosquitoes infertile by nuclear radiation in the hope to reduce populations; this is done with a cobalt-60 gamma cell irradiator. In 2016 the World Health Organization encouraged field trials of transgenic male Aedes aegypti mosquitoes developed by Oxitec to try to halt the spread of the Zika virus.

== See also ==
- Climate change and infectious diseases
