= Sandfly =

Name of several types of blood-sucking fly

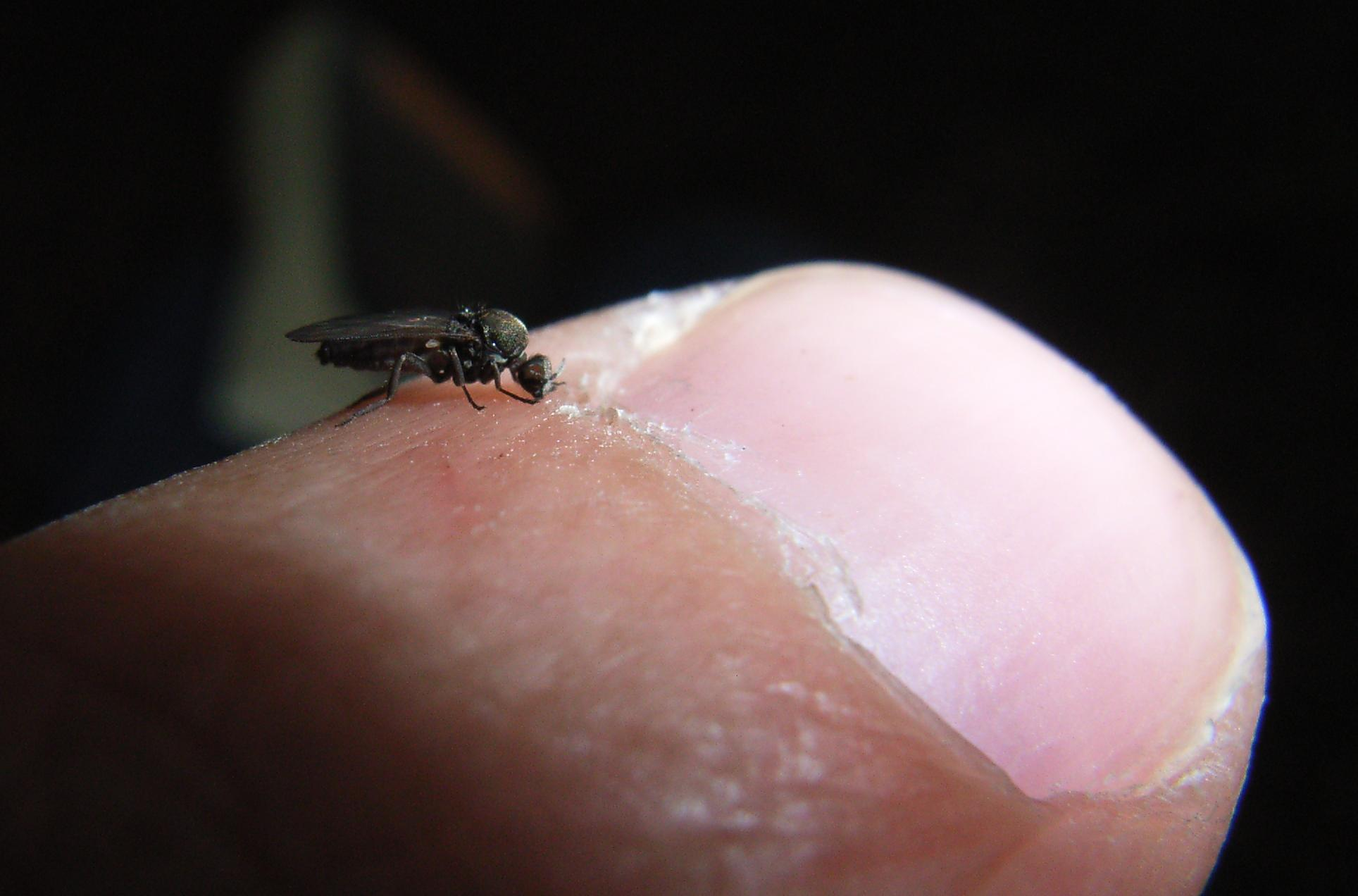
New Zealand sandfly biting a human's thumb

Sandfly or sand fly is a colloquial name for any species or genus of flying, biting, blood-sucking dipteran (fly) encountered in sandy areas. In the United States, sandfly may refer to certain horse flies that are also known as "greenheads" (family Tabanidae), or to members of the family Ceratopogonidae. The bites usually result in a small, intensely itchy bump or welt, the strength of which intensifies over a period of 5–7 days before dissipating. Sandfly bites can be distinguished from mosquito bites as sandfly bites are usually found in clusters as they attack animals in groups. Moderate relief is achieved with varying success through the application of over-the-counter products such as Benadryl (ingested) or an analgesic cream such as After Bite (applied topically). Outside the United States, sandfly may refer to members of the subfamily Phlebotominae within the Psychodidae. Biting midges (Ceratopogonidae) are sometimes called sandflies or no-see-ums (no-see-em, noseeum). New Zealand sandflies are in the genus of sand fly Austrosimulium, a type of black fly.

In the various sorts of sandfly only the female is responsible for biting and sucking the blood of mammals, reptiles and birds; the protein in the blood is necessary for the production of eggs, making the sandfly an anautogenous reproducer.

Some sandfly genera of the subfamily Phlebotominae are the primary vectors of leishmaniasis and pappataci fever; both diseases are confusingly referred to as sandfly fever. In Asia, Africa, and Europe, leishmaniasis is spread by sand flies of the genus Phlebotomus; in the Americas, the disease is spread by sandflies of the genus Lutzomyia. Belize and Honduras are notorious in the Caribbean for their sandfly populations and travel pages frequently warn tourists to bring bug spray containing high concentrations of DEET.

== Viruses ==
Among the viruses that sandflies can carry is the Chandipura virus, which, as a cousin of rabies, is deadly. There was an outbreak in India in 2010, followed by an endemic outbreak recorded in Gujarat in 2024.

== Protozoa ==
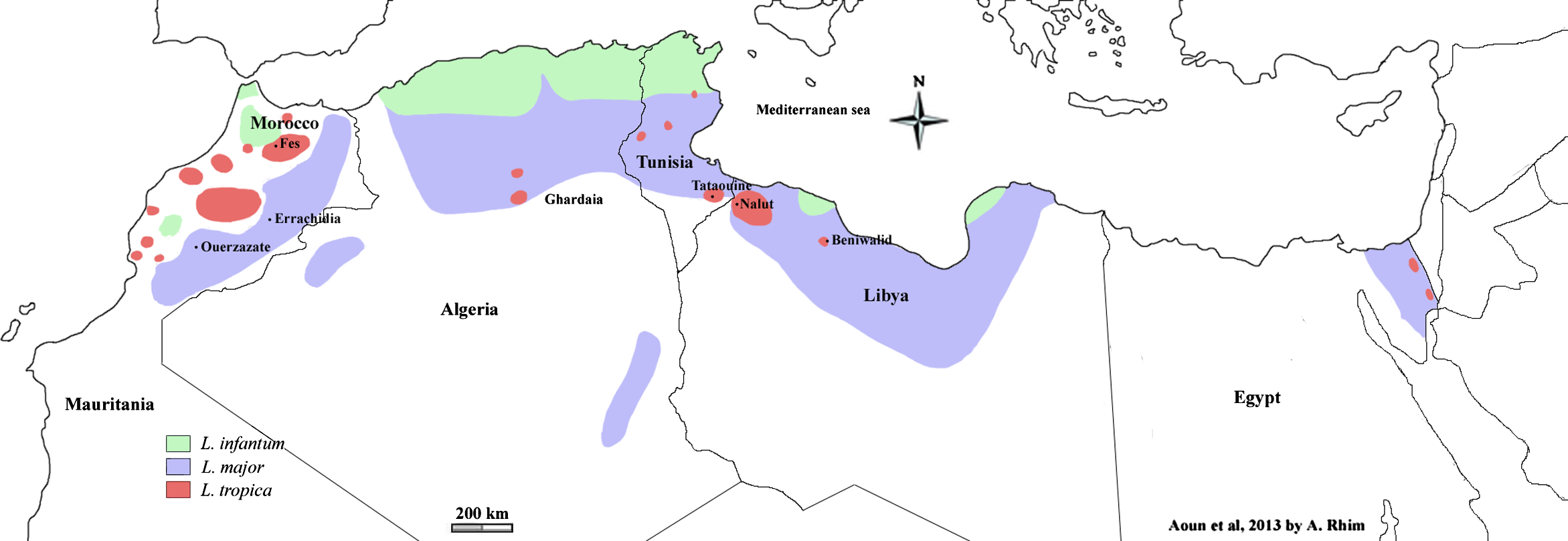
Cutaneous leishmaniasis, a disease transmitted by sandflies, in North Africa; Leishmania infantum = green, Leishmania major = blue, Leishmania tropica = red

Leishmaniasis, a disease caused by several species of the genus Leishmania, is transmitted by various sandflies.

Leishmania donovani causes spiking fevers, hepatosplenomegaly, and pancytopenia. It can be diagnosed through microscopic review by visualizing amastigotes in containing macrophages, and is treatable with sodium stibogluconate.

== Bacteria ==
Bartonella bacilliformis, the causal agent of Carrion's disease, is transmitted by different members of the genus Lutzomyia. This disease is restricted to Andean areas of Peru and Ecuador, with historical reports in Southern Colombia.

== Prevention ==
Over-the-counter repellents with high concentrations of DEET or picaridin are proven to work; however effectiveness seems to differ among individuals with some people reporting better results with one product over another while other people finding neither product effective for them. This may be partially due to various species living in different areas.

A particular extract of lemon eucalyptus oil (not the essential oil) has now been shown to be as effective as DEET in various studies.

Most information on repellents focuses on mosquitoes, but mosquito repellents are effective for sandflies and midges as well.

== Cultural views ==
New Zealand sandflies (which are taxonomically blackflies—Simuliidae) have a native Māori legend wherein "the god Tu-te-raki-whanoa had just finished creating the landscape of Fiordland, it was absolutely stunning... so stunning that it stopped people from working. They just stood around gazing at the beauty instead. The goddess Hine-nui-te-pō became angry at these unproductive people, so she created the sandfly to bite them and get them moving".

These sand flies were able, according to another Māori legend, to revive the dead hero Ha-tupatu.

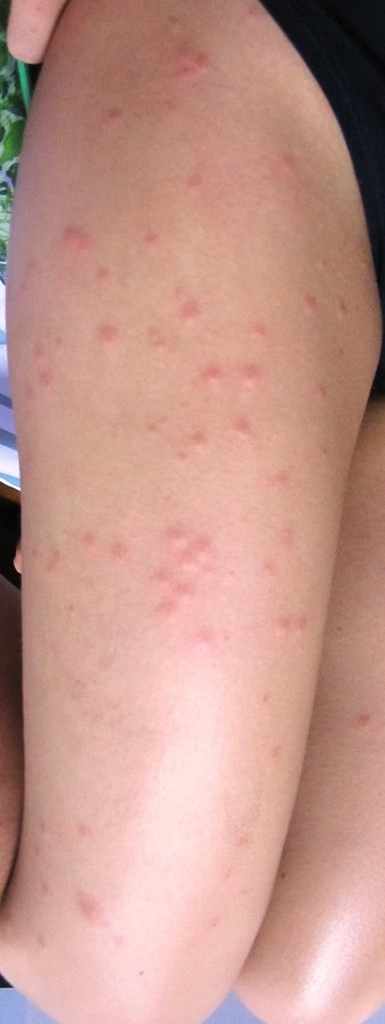
Indonesian sandfly bites on leg

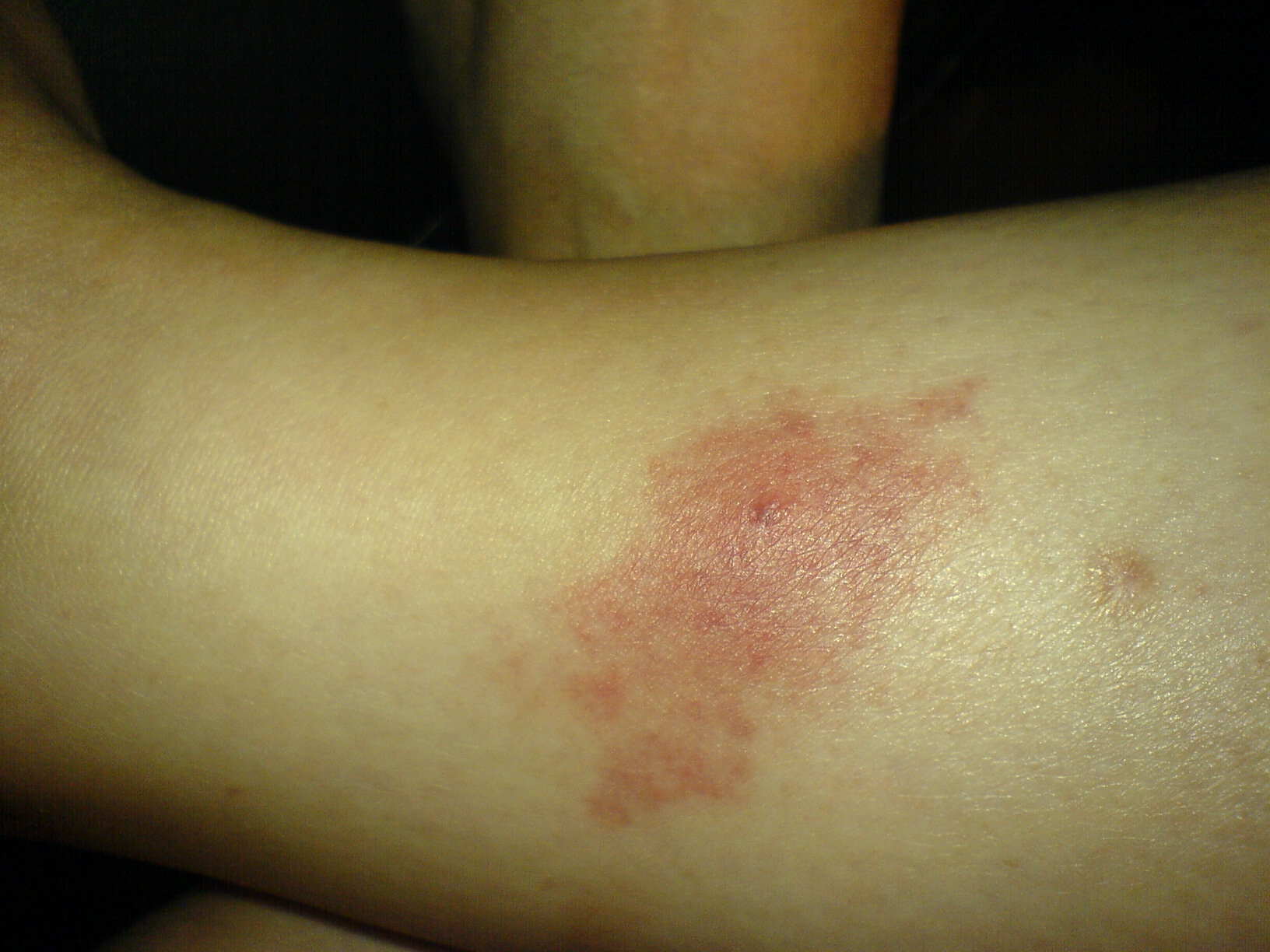
Sandfly bite

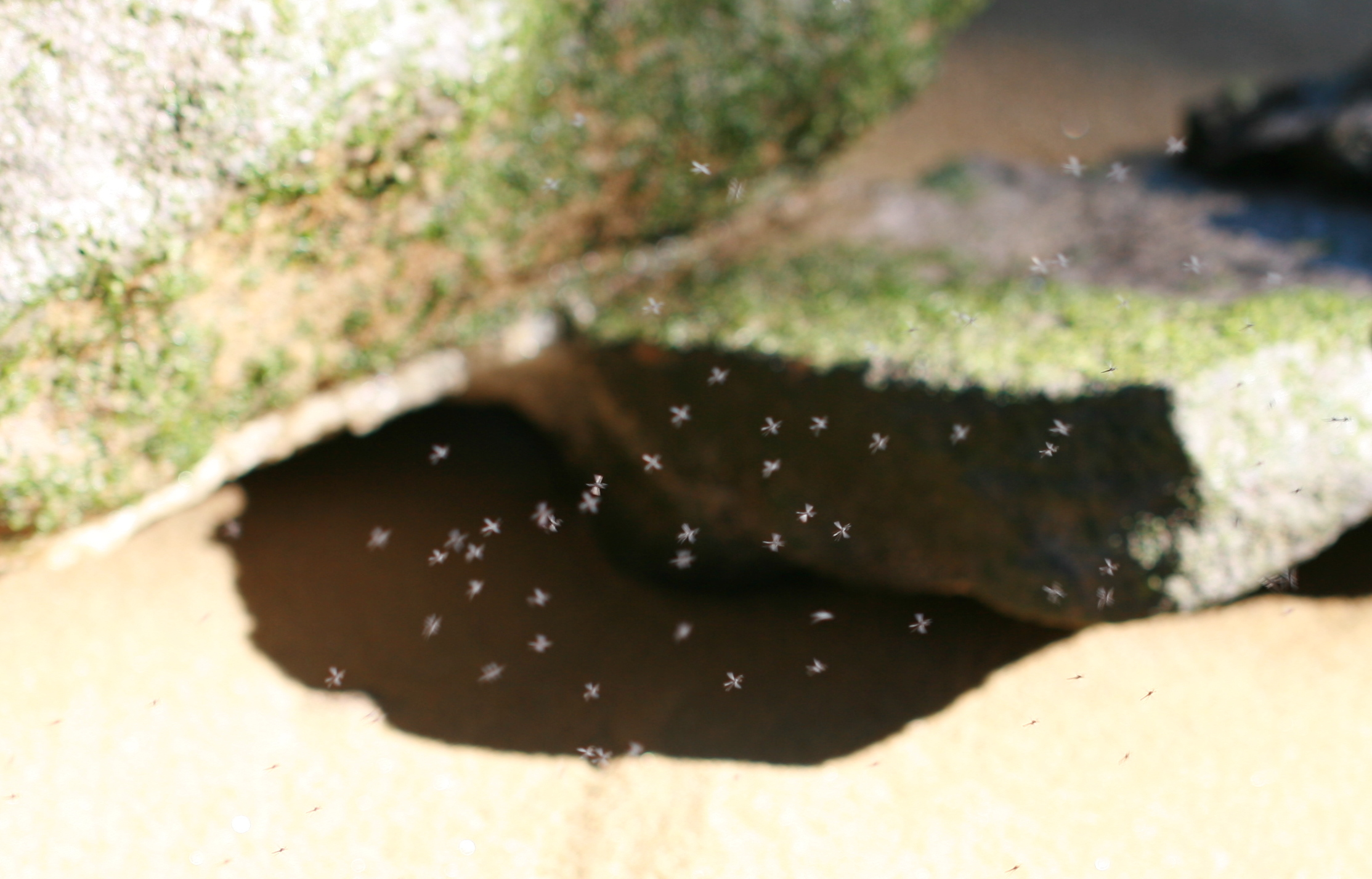
A swarm of sandflies at Georges River National Park (Australia)

== See also ==
- Prevention of sand fly-borne diseases
