= SS220 =

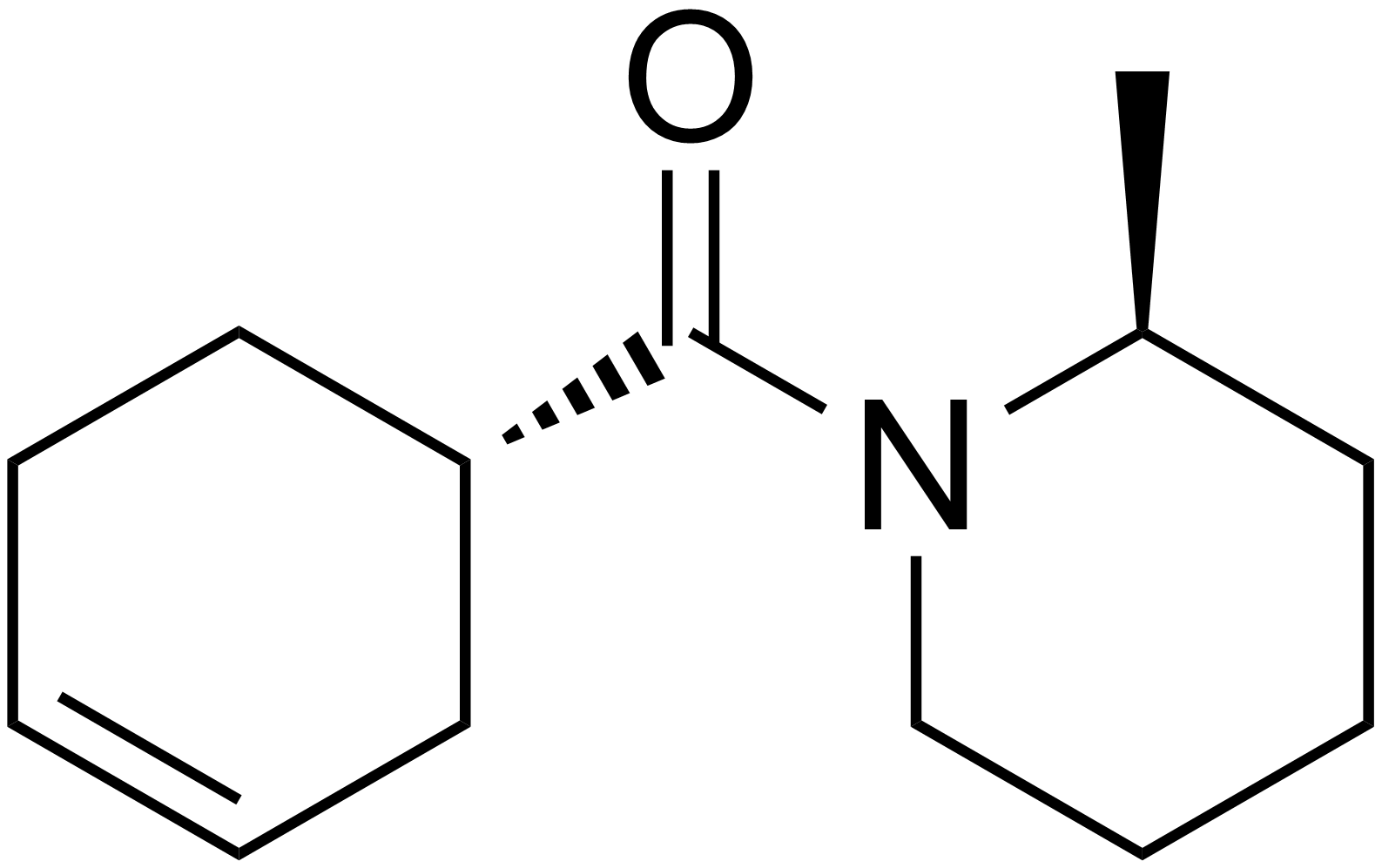

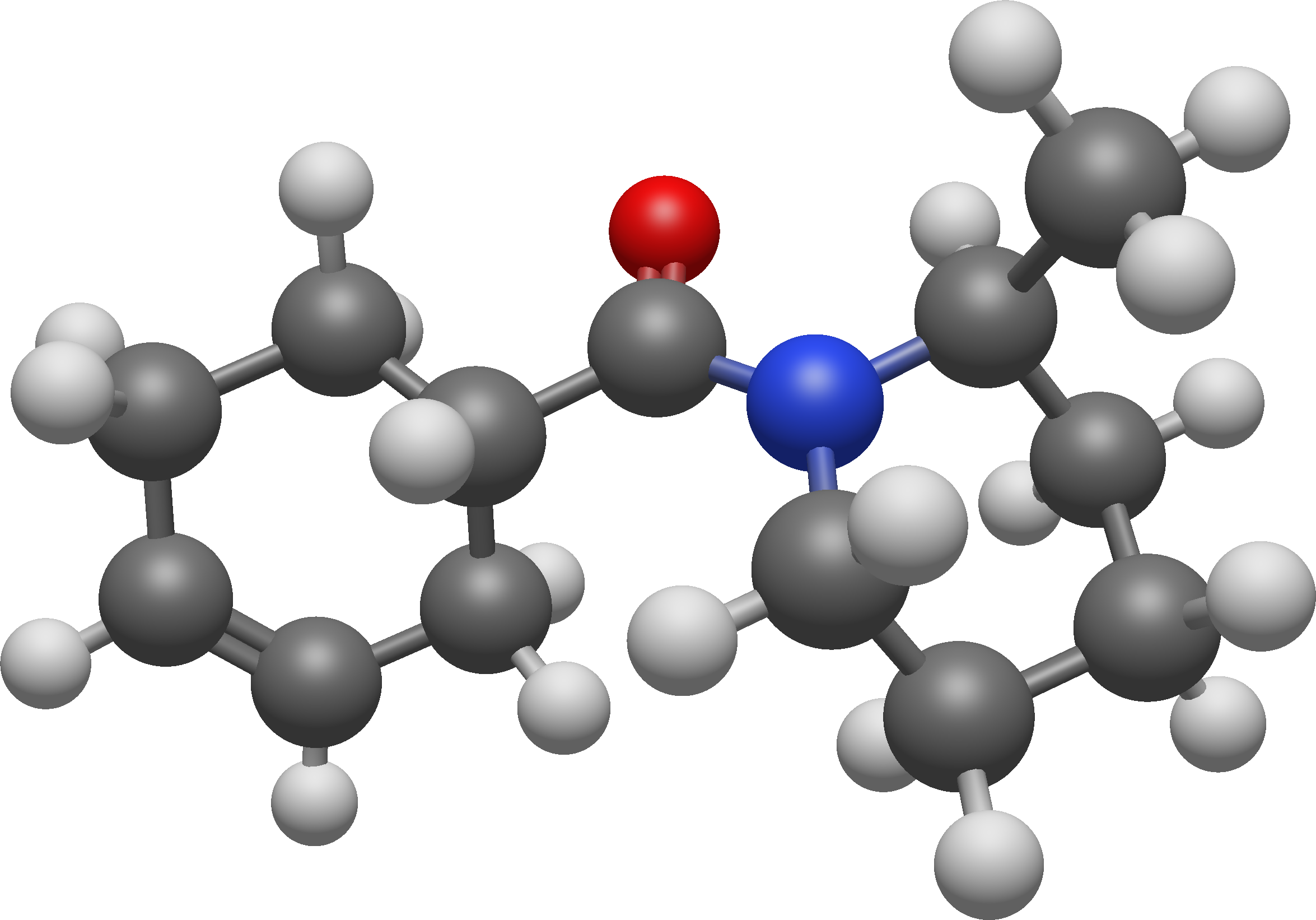

Names
- IUPAC name N-(2-methylpiperidin-1-yl)cyclohex-3-ene-1-carboxamide
- Other names (1S,2'S)-Methylpiperidinyl-3-cyclohexen- 1-carboxamide (2S)-1-[(1S)-Cyclohex-3-en-1-ylcarbonyl]-2-methylpiperidine

Identifiers
CAS Number	298207-27-9
3D model (JSmol)	Interactive image
ChemSpider	32787838
PubChem CID	40579125
UNII	A8MXE67MXB
CompTox Dashboard (EPA)	DTXSID101186531
- InChI: InChI=1S/C13H21NO/c1-11-7-5-6-10-14(11)13(15)12-8-3-2-4-9-12/h2-3,11-12H,4-10H2,1H3/t11-,12+/m0/s1 Key: KRHYGGFLEBNTHQ-NWDGAFQWSA-N
- SMILES: C[C@H]1CCCCN1C(=O)[C@H]2CCC=CC2

Properties
Chemical formula	C_{13}H_{21}NO
Molar mass	207.317 g·mol^{−1}
- Except where otherwise noted, data are given for materials in their standard state (at 25 °C [77 °F], 100 kPa). Infobox references

SS220 is an insect repellent with a broad range of efficacy.

It was developed in 2002 at the Chemicals Affecting Insect Behavior Laboratory of the United States Department of Agriculture and has been found to "exert repellent and deterrent effects upon the behavior of mosquitoes and sand flies". In the field, it has been shown to provide significantly better protection than DEET. SS220 has a slightly fruity odor, tends not to provoke allergic skin reactions, lasts longer on the skin than other repellents, does not have an oily consistency, and does not tend to plasticize. Its principal disadvantage is that only one stereoisomer of the molecule is active, meaning it will be much more costly to produce than picaridin. As of 2007 the chemical had not been registered, as the costs involved in registration are prohibitive.

== See also ==
- Icaridin, another substituted-piperidine insect-repellent
- VUAA1, Experimental insect repellent
