= (−)-menthol monooxygenase =

Class of enzymes

Identifiers
- EC no.: 1.14.13.46
- CAS no.: 117590-75-7

Databases
- IntEnz: IntEnz view
- BRENDA: BRENDA entry
- ExPASy: NiceZyme view
- KEGG: KEGG entry
- MetaCyc: metabolic pathway
- PRIAM: profile
- PDB structures: RCSB PDB PDBe PDBsum
- Gene Ontology: AmiGO / QuickGO
Search
- PMC: articles
- PubMed: articles
- NCBI: proteins

(−)-menthol monooxygenase (EC 1.14.13.46) is an enzyme that catalyzes the chemical reaction

menthol
+ NADPH + H^{+}
O_{2}
H_{2}O
p-menthane-3,8-diol
+ NADP^{+}

The four substrates of this enzyme are (−)-menthol, reduced nicotinamide adenine dinucleotide phosphate (NADPH), oxygen, and a proton. Its products are p-menthane-3,8-diol, oxidised NADP^{+}, and water.

This enzyme is an oxidoreductase, acting on paired donors, with molecular oxygen as oxidant and incorporating one of its atoms. The systematic name of this enzyme class is (−)-menthol,NADPH:oxygen oxidoreductase (8-hydroxylating). This enzyme is also called l-menthol monooxygenase.

== Uses ==
Use of (−)-menthol monooxygenase has been explored by several companies including Procter & Gamble for cleaning products.
