= RID =

RID may refer to:

- Isaiah ben Mali di Trani (the Elder), an Italian Talmudist
- Radial immunodiffusion, a scientific technique for measuring the quantity of an antigen
- Radionuclide identification device, a hand-held instrument for the detection and identification of radioactive sources
- Reactor Institute Delft, a nuclear research facility in the Netherlands
- Refractive index detector, a type of chromatography detector
- Registry of Interpreters for the Deaf, an American Sign Language interpreters' organization
- Relative identifier, a component of Microsoft Windows NT security
- RID (insect repellent), an Australian brand
- Rivista Italiana Difesa, an Italian magazine related to military and geo-strategic issues
- Robots in Disguise, an English electro band
- Royal Institute Dictionary, a prescriptive dictionary of Thailand
- Real-time Inter-network Defense, a reporting method for sharing incident-handling data between networks
- Rock Island District, commuter rail line between Chicago and Joliet, Illinois
