= 3-oxolaurate decarboxylase =

Class of enzymes

Identifiers
- EC no.: 4.1.1.56
- CAS no.: 37290-49-6

Databases
- BRENDA: enzyme data
- ExPASy: NiceZyme view
- KEGG: enzyme entry
- MetaCyc: metabolic pathway
- Rhea: reactions
- PDB structures: RCSB PDB PDBe PDBsum
- Gene Ontology: AmiGO / QuickGO
Search
- PMC: articles
- PubMed: articles
- NCBI: proteins

The enzyme 3-oxolaurate decarboxylase (EC 4.1.1.56), characterised from a fungus, catalyzes the decarboxylation of 3-oxolauric acid to 2-undecanone and carbon dioxide:

3-oxolauric acid
CO_{2}
2-undecanone

This enzyme is a lyase, specifically a carboxy-lyase, which cleave carbon-carbon bonds. The systematic name of this enzyme class is 3-oxododecanoate carboxy-lyase (2-undecanone-forming). Other names in use include beta-ketolaurate decarboxylase, beta-ketoacyl decarboxylase, and 3-oxododecanoate carboxy-lyase.
