= Bug spray =

Bug spray may refer to:

- Insect repellent
- Insecticides or other pesticides that kill "bugs" or arthropods.
- It can also mean some kind of fumigant
