= Ethyl butylacetylaminopropionate =

Names
- IUPAC name Ethyl N-acetyl-N-butyl-β-alaninate
- Preferred IUPAC name Ethyl 3-(N-butylacetamido)propanoate
- Other names: EBAAP; β-alanine, N-acetyl-N-butyl-, ethyl ester; IR3535; Insect Repellent 3535; BAAPE

Identifiers
CAS Number	52304-36-6
3D model (JSmol)	Interactive image
ChemSpider	94028
ECHA InfoCard	100.052.560
PubChem CID	104150
UNII	65GQA237EH
CompTox Dashboard (EPA)	DTXSID9035753
- InChI: InChI=1S/C11H21NO3/c1-4-6-8-12(10(3)13)9-7-11(14)15-5-2/h4-9H2,1-3H3 Key: VZRKEAFHFMSHCD-UHFFFAOYSA-N
- SMILES: CCCCN(CCC(=O)OCC)C(=O)C

Properties
Chemical formula	C_{11}H_{21}NO_{3}
Molar mass	215.293 g·mol^{−1}
Appearance	Colorless liquid
Odor	Almost odorless
Density	0.998 g/cm^{3} (at 20 °C)
Melting point	< −90 °C
Boiling point	141 °C (decomposes)
Solubility in water	70 g/L (at 20 °C)
Solubility in Acetone, ethyl acetate, dichloromethane, n-heptane, methanol, p-xylene	>250 g/L (at RT)
log P	1.7 (at 23 °C)

Hazards
- GHS labelling
Pictograms	(GHS07: Exclamation mark)
Signal word	Warning
Hazard statements	H319
Precautionary statements	P280, P305+P351+P338, P337+P313
Flash point	159 °C (318 °F; 432 K)
- Lethal dose or concentration (LD, LC)
LD_{50} (median dose)	>5000 mg/kg (rat, oral); 10000 mg/kg (rate, dermal); >5.1 mg/L (rat, inhalation)
- Except where otherwise noted, data are given for materials in their standard state (at 25 °C [77 °F], 100 kPa). verify (what is ?) Infobox references

Ethyl butylacetylaminopropionate is an insect repellent whose trade name is IR3535 and was developed and commercialized by Merck KGaA (Germany). It is a colorless and odorless oil with a good skin feel in final products, and it is biodegradable.

Unlike icaridin, IR3535 can dissolve some plastics and synthetic fabrics, except polyethylene and polypropylene.

== Effectiveness ==
IR3535 is effective in repelling several different insects such as mosquitoes species and also midges, ticks and head lice. It is as effective as DEET against Aedes and Culex mosquitoes, but may be less effective than DEET against Anopheles mosquitoes, vectors of malaria.

A 2013 review concluded that IR3535 is as effective as 20% DEET against Anopheles, citing that some studies reported possibly shorter protection of just 3.8 hours. In areas with malaria, the NHS recommends 50% DEET or at least 30% DEET or 20% icaridin instead of IR3535. IR3535, among other repellents, is included in the World Health Organization (WHO) recommendation for areas with malaria. The WHO also notes that it may be necessary to reapply repellents every 3-4 hours in hot and humid climates.

IR3535 also helps prevent bites from ticks that may transmit Lyme disease.

== Interactions ==
Few if any studies have evaluated possible interactions when using IR3535 with sunscreens.

== Mechanism of action ==
The mechanism of action is still under investigation, but it probably related to the intolerance of mosquitos and other invertebrate animals to its odor.

IR3535 is applied topically in human skin and prevent bites from mosquitos and ticks that might cause serious diseases, such as dengue, malaria, zika, West Nile virus, Lyme disease, among others.

== Chemistry ==
Comparison of ethyl butylacetylaminopropionate and beta-alanine

IR3535 is a derivative of the non-proteinogenic amino acid beta-alanine.

== Approval ==
IR3535 is approved by several authorities around the world, including ECHA (Europe) and the EPA (US) where it is considered a biopesticide.

== See also ==
- DEET
- Icaridin
- p-Menthane-3,8-diol (PMD)
- Permethrin, a pyrethroid insecticide that can be applied to clothing to help prevent bites
