= 2-Undecanone =

- 2-undecanone

Names
- Preferred IUPAC name Undecan-2-one
- Other names Methyl nonyl ketone (MNK); Nonyl methyl ketone Methyldecananone; 2-Hendecanone; Undecanone; IBI-246

Identifiers
CAS Number	112-12-9
3D model (JSmol)	Interactive image
ChEBI	CHEBI:17700
ChEMBL	ChEMBL1236582
ChemSpider	7871
DrugBank	DB08688
ECHA InfoCard	100.003.579
EC Number	203-937-5
KEGG	C01875
PubChem CID	8163
RTECS number	YQ2820000
UNII	YV5DSO8CY9
CompTox Dashboard (EPA)	DTXSID2021943
- InChI: InChI=1S/C11H22O/c1-3-4-5-6-7-8-9-10-11(2)12/h3-10H2,1-2H3 Key: KYWIYKKSMDLRDC-UHFFFAOYSA-N; InChI=1/C11H22O/c1-3-4-5-6-7-8-9-10-11(2)12/h3-10H2,1-2H3 Key: KYWIYKKSMDLRDC-UHFFFAOYAV
- SMILES: O=C(CCCCCCCCC)C

Properties
Chemical formula	C_{11}H_{22}O
Molar mass	170.296 g·mol^{−1}
Appearance	Colorless liquid
Density	0.829 g/cm^{3}, liquid
Melting point	15 °C (59 °F; 288 K)
Boiling point	231 °C (448 °F; 504 K)
Solubility in water	0.00179 g/100 mL (25 °C)

Hazards
- GHS labelling
Pictograms	(GHS09: Environmental hazard)
Signal word	Warning
Hazard statements	H400
Precautionary statements	P273, P391, P501
NFPA 704 (fire diamond)	1 2
Flash point	88 °C (190 °F; 361 K)
Safety data sheet (SDS)	External MSDS

Related compounds
Related Ketones	Acetone; Butan-2-one; 3-pentanone
- Except where otherwise noted, data are given for materials in their standard state (at 25 °C [77 °F], 100 kPa). verify (what is ?) Infobox references

2-Undecanone, also known as methyl nonyl ketone and IBI-246, is an organic compound with the formula CH_{3}C(O)C_{9}H_{19}. It is a colorless oil. 2-Undecanone is usually produced synthetically, but it can also be extracted from various plant sources, including from essential oil of rue. It is found naturally in bananas, cloves, ginger, guava, strawberries, wild-grown tomatoes, and the perennial leaf vegetable Houttuynia cordata.

== Uses ==
Because of its strong odor it is primarily used as an insect repellent or animal repellent. Typically, 1–2% concentrations of 2-undecanone are found in dog and cat repellents in the form of a liquid, aerosol spray, or gel. 2-Undecanone is also used in the perfumery and flavoring industries.

It has been investigated as a mosquito repellant, like DEET.

== Chemical properties ==
2-Undecanone is a ketone that is soluble in organic solvents but insoluble in water. Like most methyl ketones, 2-undecanone undergoes a haloform reaction when in the presence of a basic solution of hypochlorite. For example, the reaction between 2-undecanone and sodium hypochlorite yields sodium decanoate, chloroform, and sodium hydroxide.

CH_{3}CO(CH_{2})_{8}CH_{3} + 3 NaOCl → CH_{3}(CH_{2})_{8}COONa + CHCl_{3} + 2 NaOH

== See also ==
- Perfume allergy
