= VUAA1 =

Names
- Preferred IUPAC name N-(4-Ethylphenyl)-2-{[4-ethyl-5-(pyridin-3-yl)-4H-1,2,4-triazol-3-yl]sulfanyl}acetamide

Identifiers
CAS Number	525582-84-7
3D model (JSmol)	Interactive image
ChemSpider	1105882
PubChem CID	1319135
UNII	ZZ52US95LQ
CompTox Dashboard (EPA)	DTXSID401029734
- InChI: InChI=1S/C19H21N5OS/c1-3-14-7-9-16(10-8-14)21-17(25)13-26-19-23-22-18(24(19)4-2)15-6-5-11-20-12-15/h5-12H,3-4,13H2,1-2H3,(H,21,25) Key: UWCCKVJVOHTHAF-UHFFFAOYSA-N
- SMILES: CCN1C(C2=CN=CC=C2)=NN=C1SCC(NC3=CC=C(CC)C=C3)=O

Properties
Chemical formula	C_{19}H_{21}N_{5}OS
Molar mass	367.47 g·mol^{−1}

Hazards
- GHS labelling
Pictograms	(GHS07: Exclamation mark)
Signal word	Warning
Hazard statements	H315, H319, H335
Precautionary statements	P261, P264, P271, P280, P302+P352, P304+P340, P305+P351+P338, P312, P321, P332+P313, P337+P313, P362, P403+P233, P405, P501
- Except where otherwise noted, data are given for materials in their standard state (at 25 °C [77 °F], 100 kPa). verify (what is ?) Infobox references

VUAA1 is a chemical compound that works by over activating an insect's olfactory senses causing a repellent effect. It is considered to be an Orco allosteric agonist. It was discovered at Vanderbilt University with research being partially funded by the Bill and Melinda Gates Foundation.

VUAA1 is an agonist believed to work by overloading an insect's odorant receptors. It may be 1000 times stronger than DEET and may lead to, "a powerful new family of compounds that can be used to disrupt the destructive behaviors of nuisance insects, agricultural pests, and disease vectors alike."

VUAA1 has also been shown to stimulate mosquito sperm motility, thus showing a link between a mosquito's sense of smell and reproduction.
