= Insect repellent =

Substance which repels insects

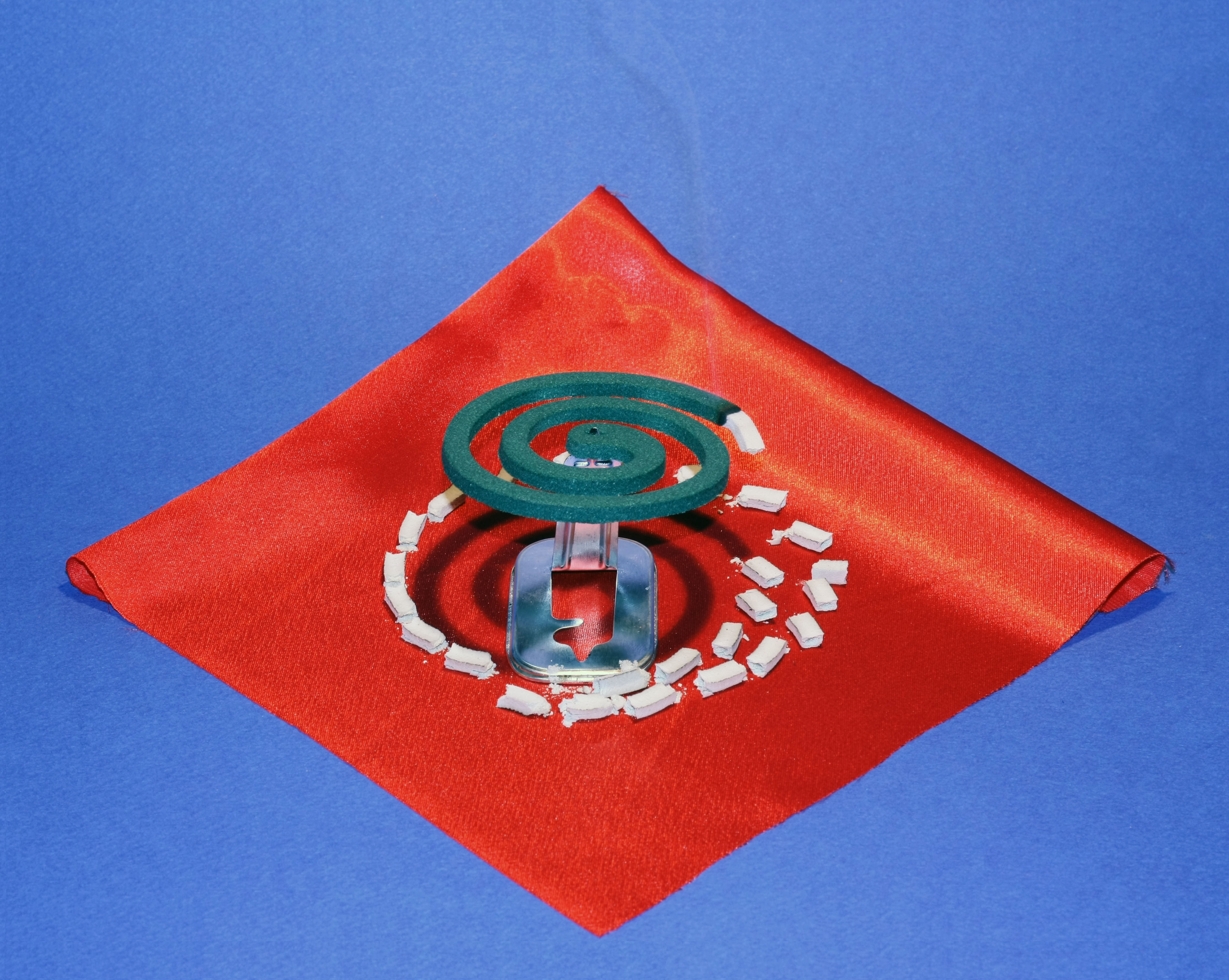
A mosquito coil

An insect repellent (also commonly called "bug spray" or "bug deterrent") is a substance applied to the skin, clothing, or other surfaces to discourage insects (and arthropods in general) from landing or climbing on that surface. Insect repellents help prevent and control the outbreak of insect-borne (and other arthropod-borne) diseases such as malaria, Lyme disease, dengue fever, bubonic plague, river blindness, and West Nile fever. Pest animals commonly serving as vectors for disease include insects such as flea, fly, and mosquito; and arachnids such as ticks .

Some insect repellents are insecticides (bug killers), but most simply discourage insects and send them flying or crawling away.

== Effectiveness ==
Synthetic repellents tend to be more effective and/or longer lasting than "natural" repellents.

For protection against ticks and mosquito bites, the U.S. Centers for Disease Control (CDC) recommends DEET, icaridin (picaridin, KBR 3023), oil of lemon eucalyptus (OLE), para-menthane-diol (PMD), IR3535 and 2-undecanone with the caveat that higher percentages of the active ingredient provide longer protection.

In 2015, researchers at New Mexico State University tested 10 commercially available products for their effectiveness at repelling mosquitoes. The known active ingredients tested included DEET (at various concentrations), geraniol, p-menthane-3-8-diol (found in lemon eucalyptus oil), thiamine, and several oils (soybean, rosemary, cinnamon, lemongrass, citronella, and lemon eucalyptus). Two of the products tested were fragrances where the active ingredients were unknown. On the mosquito Aedes aegypti, only one repellent that did not contain DEET had a strong effect for the duration of the 240 minutes test: a lemon eucalyptus oil repellent. However, Victoria's Secret Bombshell, a perfume not advertised as an insect repellent, performed effectively during the first 120 minutes after application.

In one comparative study from 2004, IR3535 was as effective or better than DEET in protection against Aedes aegypti and Culex quinquefasciatus mosquitoes. Other sources (official publications of the associations of German physicians as well as of German druggists) suggest the contrary and state DEET is still the most efficient substance available and the substance of choice for stays in malaria regions, while IR3535 has little effect. However, some plant-based repellents may provide effective relief as well. Essential oil repellents can be short-lived in their effectiveness.

A test of various insect repellents by an independent consumer organization found that repellents containing DEET or icaridin are more effective than repellents with "natural" active ingredients. All the synthetics gave almost 100% repellency for the first 2 hours, where the natural repellent products were most effective for the first 30 to 60 minutes, and required reapplication to be effective over several hours.

Although highly toxic to cats, permethrin is recommended as protection against mosquitoes for clothing, gear, or bed nets. In an earlier report, the CDC found oil of lemon eucalyptus to be more effective than other plant-based treatments, with a similar effectiveness to low concentrations of DEET. However, a 2006 published study found in both cage and field studies that a product containing 40% oil of lemon eucalyptus was just as effective as products containing high concentrations of DEET. Research has also found that neem oil is mosquito repellent for up to 12 hours. Citronella oil's mosquito repellency has also been verified by research, including effectiveness in repelling Aedes aegypti, but requires reapplication after 30 to 60 minutes.

There are also products available based on sound production, particularly ultrasound (inaudibly high-frequency sounds) which purport to be insect repellents. However, these electronic devices have been shown to be ineffective based on studies done by the United States Environmental Protection Agency and many universities.

== Safety issues ==
=== For humans ===
DEET

Icaridin

p-Menthane-3,8-diol (PMD)

Children may be at greater risk for adverse reactions to repellents, in part, because their exposure may be greater. Children can be at greater risk of accidental eye contact or ingestion. As with chemical exposures in general, pregnant women should take care to avoid exposures to repellents when practical, as the fetus may be vulnerable.

Some experts also recommend against applying chemicals such as DEET and sunscreen simultaneously since that would increase DEET penetration. Canadian researcher, Xiaochen Gu, a professor at the University of Manitoba's faculty of Pharmacy who led a study about mosquitos, advises that DEET should be applied 30 or more minutes later. Gu also recommends insect repellent sprays instead of lotions which are rubbed into the skin "forcing molecules into the skin".

Regardless of which repellent product used, it is recommended to read the label before use and carefully follow directions. Usage instructions for repellents vary from country to country. Some insect repellents are not recommended for use on younger children.

In the DEET Reregistration Eligibility Decision (RED) the United States Environmental Protection Agency (EPA) reported 14 to 46 cases of potential DEET associated seizures, including 4 deaths. The EPA states: "... it does appear that some cases are likely related to DEET toxicity", but observed that with 30% of the US population using DEET, the likely seizure rate is only about one per 100 million users.

The Pesticide Information Project of Cooperative Extension Offices of Cornell University states that, "Everglades National Park employees having extensive DEET exposure were more likely to have insomnia, mood disturbances and impaired cognitive function than were lesser exposed co-workers".

The EPA states that citronella oil shows little or no toxicity and has been used as a topical insect repellent for 60 years. However, the EPA also states that citronella may irritate skin and cause dermatitis in certain individuals. Canadian regulatory authorities concern with citronella based repellents is primarily based on data-gaps in toxicology, not on incidents.

Within countries of the European Union, implementation of Regulation 98/8/EC, commonly referred to as the Biocidal Products Directive, has severely limited the number and type of insect repellents available to European consumers. Only a small number of active ingredients have been supported by manufacturers in submitting dossiers to the EU Authorities.

In general, only formulations containing DEET, icaridin (sold under the trade name Saltidin and formerly known as Bayrepel or KBR3023), IR3535 and citriodiol (p-menthane-3,8-diol) are available. Most "natural" insect repellents such as citronella, neem oil, and herbal extracts are no longer permitted for sale as insect repellents in the EU due to their lack of effectiveness; this does not preclude them from being sold for other purposes, as long as the label does not indicate they are a biocide (insect repellent).

=== Toxicity for other animals ===
A 2018 study found that icaridin is highly toxic to salamander larvae, in what the authors described as conservative exposure doses. The LC50 standard was additionally found to be completely inadequate in the context of finding this result.

Permethrin is highly toxic to cats but not to dogs or humans.

== Common insect repellents ==
=== Common synthetic insect repellents ===
- Benzaldehyde, for bees
- Butopyronoxyl (trade name Indalone). Widely used in a "6-2-2" mixture (60% Dimethyl phthalate, 20% Indalone, 20% Ethylhexanediol) during the 1940s and 1950s before the commercial introduction of DEET
- DEET (N,N-diethyl-m-toluamide) the most common and effective insect repellent
- Dimethyl carbate
- Dimethyl phthalate, not as common as it once was but still occasionally an active ingredient in commercial insect repellents
- Ethyl butylacetylaminopropionate (IR3535 or 3-[N-Butyl-N-acetyl]-aminopropionic acid, ethyl ester)
- Ethylhexanediol, also known as Rutgers 612 or "6–12 repellent", discontinued in the US in 1991 due to evidence of causing developmental defects in animals
- Icaridin, also known as picaridin, Bayrepel, and KBR 3023 considered equal in effectiveness to DEET
- Methyl anthranilate and other anthranilate-based insect repellents
- Metofluthrin
- Permethrin is a contact insecticide rather than a repellent
- SS220 is a repellent being researched that has shown promise to provide significantly better protection than DEET
- Tricyclodecenyl allyl ether, a compound often found in synthetic perfumes

=== Common natural insect repellents ===
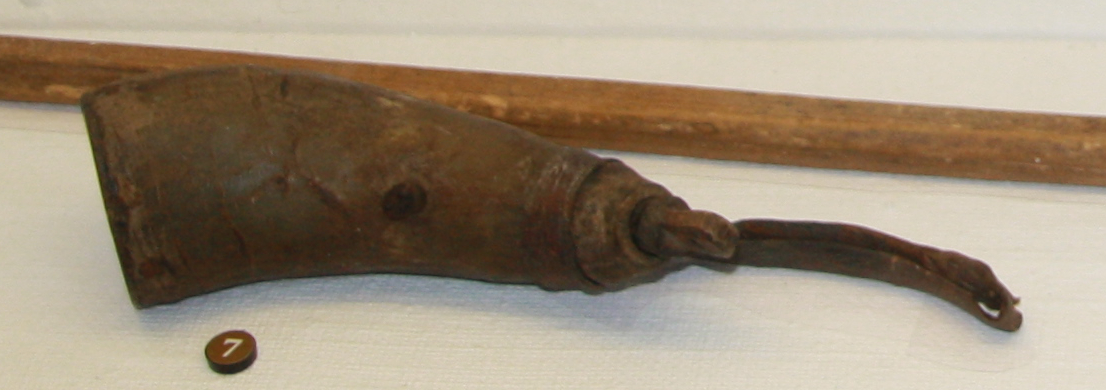
A cowhorn container for mosquito-repelling pitch oil (a by-product of the distillation of wood tar) on display at the Nordiska museum, Stockholm.

- Beautyberry (Callicarpa) leaves
- Birch tree bark is traditionally made into tar. Combined with another oil (e.g., fish oil) at 1/2 dilution, it is then applied to the skin for repelling mosquitos
- Bog myrtle (Myrica gale)
- Catnip oil whose active compound is Nepetalactone
- Citronella oil (citronella candles are not effective)
- Essential oil of the lemon eucalyptus (Corymbia citriodora) and its active compound p-menthane-3,8-diol (PMD)
- Lemongrass
- Neem oil
- Tea tree oil from the leaves of Melaleuca alternifolia
- Tobacco

=== Insect repellents from natural sources ===
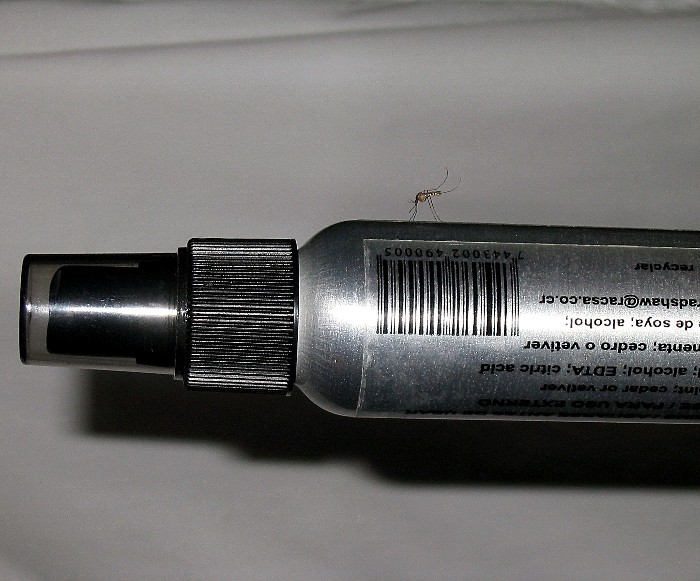
A mosquito on a bottle of "natural" insect repellent

Several natural ingredients are certified by the United States Environmental Protection Agency as insect repellents, namely catnip oil, oil of lemon eucalyptus (OLE) (and its active ingredient p-Menthane-3,8-diol), oil of citronella, and 2-Undecanone, which is usually produced synthetically but has also been isolated from many plant sources.

Many other studies have also investigated the potential of natural compounds from plants as insect repellents. Moreover, there are many preparations from naturally occurring sources that have been used as a repellent to certain insects. Some of these act as insecticides while others are only repellent. Below is a list of some natural products with repellent activity:

- Achillea alpina (mosquitos)
- alpha-terpinene (mosquitos)
- Andrographis paniculata extracts (mosquito)
- Basil
  - Sweet basil (Ocimum basilicum)
- Breadfruit (Insect repellent, including mosquitoes)
- Callicarpa americana (beautyberry)
- Camphor (mosquitoes)
- Carvacrol (mosquitos)
- Castor oil (Ricinus communis) (mosquitos)
- Catnip oil (Nepeta species) (nepetalactone against mosquitos)
- Cedar oil (mosquitos, moths)
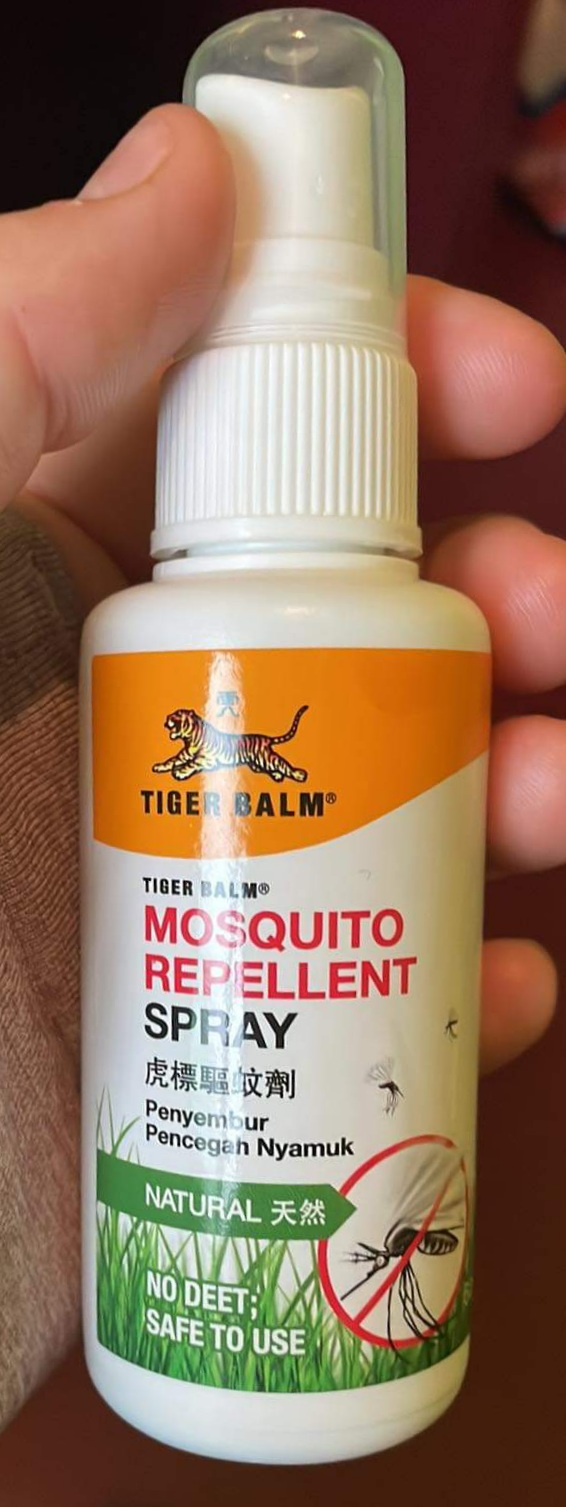
- Insect repellent made with natural, plant-based active ingredients is less effective than conventional repellents
  Celery extract (Apium graveolens) (mosquitos) In clinical testing an extract of celery was demonstrated to be at least equally effective to 25% DEET, although the commercial availability of such an extract is not known.
- Cinnamon (leaf oil kills mosquito larvae)
- Citronella oil (repels mosquitos) (contains insect repelling substances, such as citronellol and geraniol)
- Clove oil (mosquitos)
- D-Limonene (ticks, fleas, flies, mosquitoes, and other insects) (widely used in insect repellents for pets)
- Eucalyptus oil (70%+ eucalyptol), (cineol is a synonym), mosquitos, flies, dust mites In the U.S., eucalyptus oil was first registered in 1948 as an insecticide and miticide.
- Fennel oil (Foeniculum vulgare) (mosquitos)
- Garlic (Allium sativum) (Mosquito, rice weevil, wheat flour beetle)
- Geranium oil (also known as Pelargonium graveolens)
- Hinokitiol (ticks, mosquitos, larvae)
- Lavender (ineffective alone, but measurable effect in certain repellent mixtures)
- Lemon eucalyptus (Corymbia citriodora) essential oil and its active ingredient p-menthane-3,8-diol (PMD)
- Lemongrass oil (Cymbopogon species) (mosquitos)
  - East-Indian lemon grass (Cymbopogon flexuosus)
- Linalool (ticks, fleas, mites, mosquitoes, spiders, cockroach)
- Marjoram (spider mites Tetranychus urticae and Eutetranychus orientalis)
- Mint (menthol is active chemical.) (Mentha sp.)
- Neem oil (Azadirachta indica) (Repels or kills mosquitos, their larvae and a plethora of other insects including those in agriculture)
- Nootkatone (ticks, mosquitoes and other insects)
- Oleic acid, repels bees and ants by simulating the "smell of death" produced by their decomposing corpses.
- Pennyroyal (Mentha pulegium) (mosquitos, fleas,) but very toxic to pets
- Peppermint (Mentha x piperita) (mosquitos)
- Pyrethrum (from Chrysanthemum species, particularly C. cinerariifolium and C. coccineum)
- Rosemary (Rosmarinus officinalis) (mosquitos)
- Spanish Flag (Lantana camara) (against Tea Mosquito Bug, Helopeltis theivora)
- Tea tree oil from the leaves of Melaleuca alternifolia
- Thyme (Thymus species) (mosquitos)
- Yellow nightshade (Solanum villosum), berry juice (against Stegomyia aegypti mosquitos)

=== Less effective methods ===
Some old studies suggested that the ingestion of large doses of thiamine (vitamin B_{1}) could be effective as an oral insect repellent against mosquito bites. However, there is now conclusive evidence that thiamin has no efficacy against mosquito bites. Some claim that plants such as wormwood or sagewort, lemon balm, lemon grass, lemon thyme, and the mosquito plant (Pelargonium) will act against mosquitoes. However, scientists have determined that these plants are "effective" for a limited time only when the leaves are crushed and applied directly to the skin.

There are several, widespread, unproven theories about mosquito control, such as the assertion that vitamin B, in particular B_{1} (thiamine), garlic, ultrasonic devices or incense can be used to repel or control mosquitoes. Moreover, manufacturers of "mosquito repelling" ultrasonic devices have been found to be fraudulent, and their devices were deemed "useless" according to a review of scientific studies.

== Alternatives to repellent ==
People can reduce the number of mosquito bites they receive (to a greater or lesser degree) by:

- Using a mosquito net
- Wearing long clothing that covers the skin and is tucked in to seal up holes
- Avoiding the outdoors during dawn and dusk, when mosquitos are most active
- Keeping air moving to prevent mosquitos from landing, such as by using a fan
- Wearing light-colored clothing (light objects are harder for mosquitos to detect)
- Reducing exercise, which reduces output of carbon dioxide used by mosquitos for detection

== History ==
Testing and scientific certainty were desired at the end of the 1940s. To that end products meant to be used by humans were tested with model animals to speed trials. Eddy & McGregor 1949 and Wiesmann & Lotmar 1949 used mice, Wasicky et al. 1949 canaries and guinea pigs, Kasman et al. 1953 also guinea pigs, Starnes & Granett 1953 rabbits, and many used cattle.

== See also ==
- Fly spray (insecticide)
- Mosquito coil
- Mosquito control
- Mosquito net
- Pest control
- RID Insect Repellent
- Slug tape
- VUAA1
- Chemical ecology
