= Anthranilate-based insect repellents =

Anthranilate-based insect repellents include methyl anthranilate, N,N-dimethylanthranilic acid (DMA), ethyl anthranilate (EA), and butyl anthranilate (BA). Chemically, they are esters of anthranilic acid. While the United States Food and Drug Administration (FDA) has approved some of these compounds for use as food additives, cinnamyl anthranilate is banned by the FDA. The compounds repel both fruit flies and mosquitos, and target the same neurons that respond to DEET. The receptors are located on part of the antennae known as the sacculus.

DMA and EA repel mosquitos from feeding on humans, while EA and BA repel them from depositing eggs in water.

== Identification ==
The compounds were the only ones among approximately 500,000 that activated those receptors and were from natural sources that were already approved by the FDA for use as food additives.

== Applications ==
The compounds are being evaluated for human use as mosquito repellents and also for use in agriculture.
