= Picaridin =

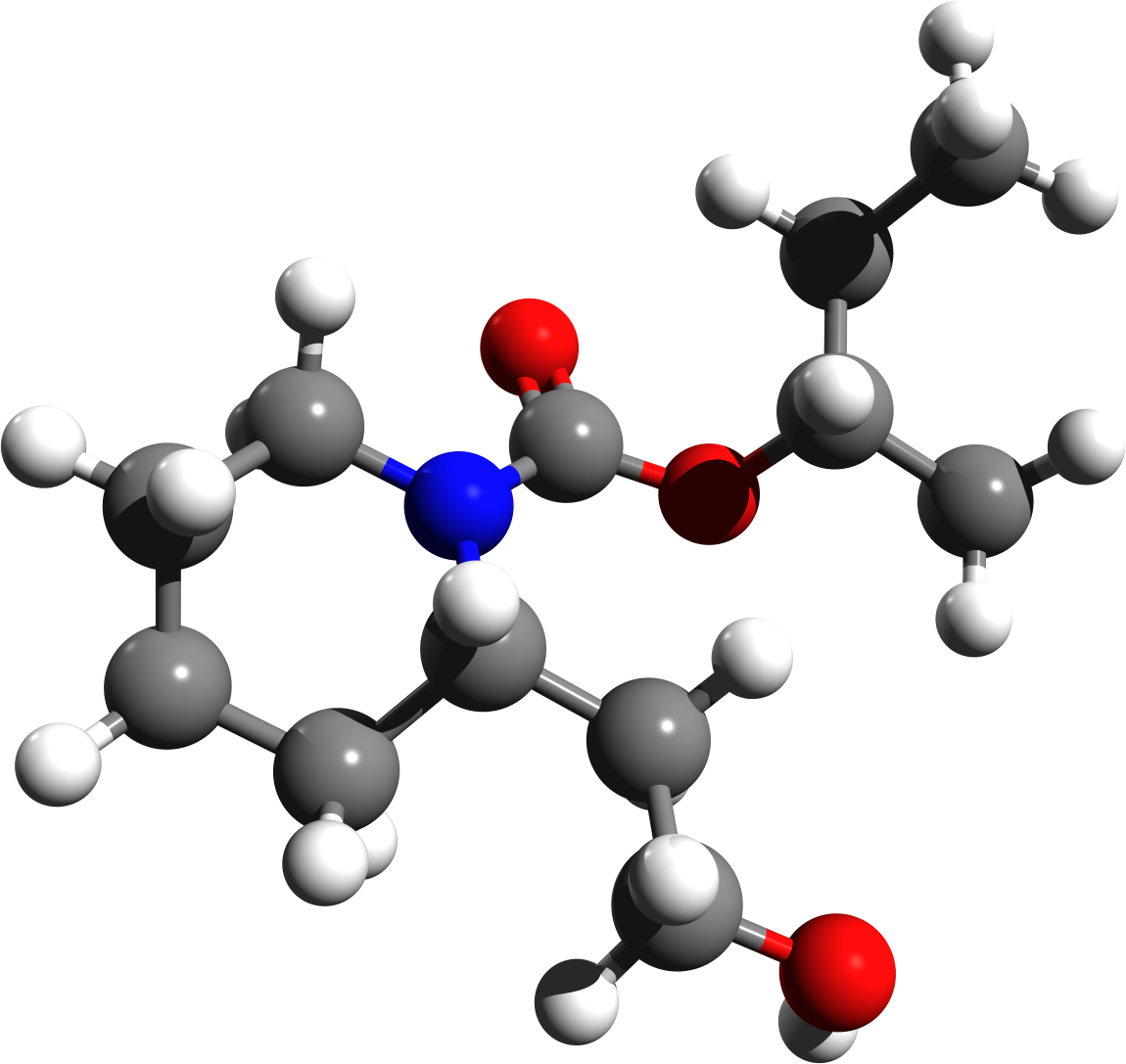

Names
- Preferred IUPAC name Butan-2-yl 2-(2-hydroxyethyl)piperidine-1-carboxylate
- Other names: KBR 3023; Hydroxyethyl isobutyl piperidine carboxylate; sec-Butyl 2-(2-hydroxyethyl)piperidine-1-carboxylate

Identifiers
CAS Number	119515-38-7
3D model (JSmol)	Interactive image
ChEMBL	ChEMBL2104314
ChemSpider	111359
ECHA InfoCard	100.102.177
PubChem CID	125098
UNII	N51GQX0837
CompTox Dashboard (EPA)	DTXSID0034227
- InChI: InChI=1S/C12H23NO3/c1-3-10(2)16-12(15)13-8-5-4-6-11(13)7-9-14/h10-11,14H,3-9H2,1-2H3 Key: QLHULAHOXSSASE-UHFFFAOYSA-N; InChI=1/C12H23NO3/c1-3-10(2)16-12(15)13-8-5-4-6-11(13)7-9-14/h10-11,14H,3-9H2,1-2H3 Key: QLHULAHOXSSASE-UHFFFAOYAQ
- SMILES: O=C(OC(C)CC)N1C(CCO)CCCC1

Properties
Chemical formula	C_{12}H_{23}NO_{3}
Molar mass	229.320 g·mol^{−1}
Appearance	colorless liquid
Odor	odorless
Density	1.07 g/cm^{3}
Melting point	−170 °C (−274 °F; 103 K)
Boiling point	296 °C (565 °F; 569 K)
Solubility in water	0.82 g/100 mL
Solubility	752 g/100mL (acetone)
Refractive index (n_{D})	1.4717
- Except where otherwise noted, data are given for materials in their standard state (at 25 °C [77 °F], 100 kPa). verify (what is ?) Infobox references

Picaridin, also known as icaridin, is an insect repellent that can be used directly on skin or clothing. It has broad efficacy against various arthropods such as mosquitos, ticks, gnats, flies and fleas, and is almost colorless and odorless. A study performed in 2010 showed that picaridin spray and cream at the 20% concentration provided 12 hours of protection against ticks. Unlike DEET, picaridin does not dissolve plastics, synthetics or sealants, is odorless and non-greasy and presents a lower risk of toxicity when used with sunscreen, as it may reduce skin absorption of both compounds.

The name picaridin was proposed as an International Nonproprietary Name (INN) to the World Health Organization (WHO), but the official name that has been approved by the WHO is icaridin. The chemical is part of the piperidine family, along with many pharmaceuticals and alkaloids such as piperine, which gives black pepper its spicy taste.

Trade names include Bayrepel and Saltidin among others. The compound was developed by the German chemical company Bayer in the 1980s and was given the name Bayrepel. In 2005, Lanxess AG and its subsidiary Saltigo GmbH were spun off from Bayer and the product was renamed Saltidin in 2008.

Picaridin has been sold in Europe, where it is the best-selling insect repellent, since 1998. On 23 July 2020, the EU Commission approved it again for use in repellent products. The approval entered into force on 1 February 2022 and is valid for ten years.

== Effectiveness ==
Picaridin and DEET are the most effective insect repellents available. A 2018 systematic review of field studies found “it reasonable to offer [either] DEET or picaridin as a first choice” in outlier countries such as Canada that ban the sale of insect repellents with DEET concentrations above 30%. For most of the world, the 2018 review considers >50% DEET products “as first choice repellents”.

The US Center For Disease Control (CDC) states that “insect repellents that contain DEET offer the best protection against mosquito bites” on the webpage intended to inform US residents how to prevent Malaria when traveling.

The online Health Encyclopedia published by Kaiser Permanente also identifies DEET as the most effective insect (Mosquito, Tick, and Fly) repellent for preventing the spread of infection and reducing disease. By contrast, the authors allowed more uncertainty on Picaridin by writing it “may work as well as DEET in repelling insects”.

Picaridin has been reported to not cause the irritation associated with DEET.

Picaridin-based products have been evaluated by Consumer Reports in 2016 as among the most effective insect repellents when used at a 20% concentration. Picaridin was earlier reported to be effective by Consumer Reports (7% solution) and the Australian Army (20% solution). Consumer Reports retests in 2006 gave as result that a 7% solution of picaridin offered little or no protection against Aedes mosquitoes (vector of dengue fever) and a protection time of about 2.5 hours against Culex (vector of West Nile virus), while a 15% solution was good for about one hour against Aedes and 4.8 hours against Culex.

== Adverse effects ==
Picaridin can cause mild to moderate eye irritation on contact and is slightly toxic if ingested.

== Environmental impact ==
A 2018 study found that a commercial repellent product containing 20% picaridin, in what the authors described as "conservative exposure doses", is highly toxic to larval salamanders, a major predator of mosquito larvae. The study observed high larval salamander mortality occurring delayed after the four days of exposure. Because the widely used LC50 test for assessing a chemical's environmental toxicity is based on mortality within four days, the authors suggested that picaridin would be incorrectly deemed as "safe" under the test protocol. However, picaridin was also non-toxic in a 21-day reproduction test on the water flea Daphnia magna and a 32-day early life-stage test in zebrafish.

Since only the picaridin content of the tested repellent product is known, the observed effects cannot be readily attributed to picaridin. Furthermore, the effects of the repellent product showed no dose-response relationship, i.e., there was neither an increase of the magnitude or severity of the observed effects (mortality, tail deformation), nor did the effects occur at earlier time points. The study has been regarded as invalid by the Danish Environmental Protection Agency, which has evaluated picaridin prior to its approval under the EU Biocidal Product Regulation. The reasons for rejection were the testing of a mixture of undisclosed composition, the use of a non-standard test organism, the lack of analytical verification of actual test concentrations, and the fact that the test solution was never renewed with the 25 days of study duration.

== Mechanism of action ==
In 2014, a potential odorant receptor for picaridin (and DEET), CquiOR136•CquiOrco, was suggested for Culex quinquefasciatus mosquito.

Recent crystal and solution studies showed that picaridin binds to Anopheles gambiae odorant binding protein 1 (AgamOBP1). The crystal structure of AgamOBP1•picaridin complex (PDB: 5EL2) revealed that picaridin binds to the DEET-binding site in two distinct orientations and also to a second binding site (sIC-binding site) located at the C-terminal region of the AgamOBP1.

Research on Anopheles coluzzii mosquitoes suggests picaridin does not strongly activate their olfactory receptor neurons, but instead reduces the volatility of the odorants with which it is mixed. By reducing their volatility, picaridin effectively "masks" odorants attractive to mosquitoes on the skin, preventing them from reaching the olfactory receptors to some extent.

== Chemistry ==
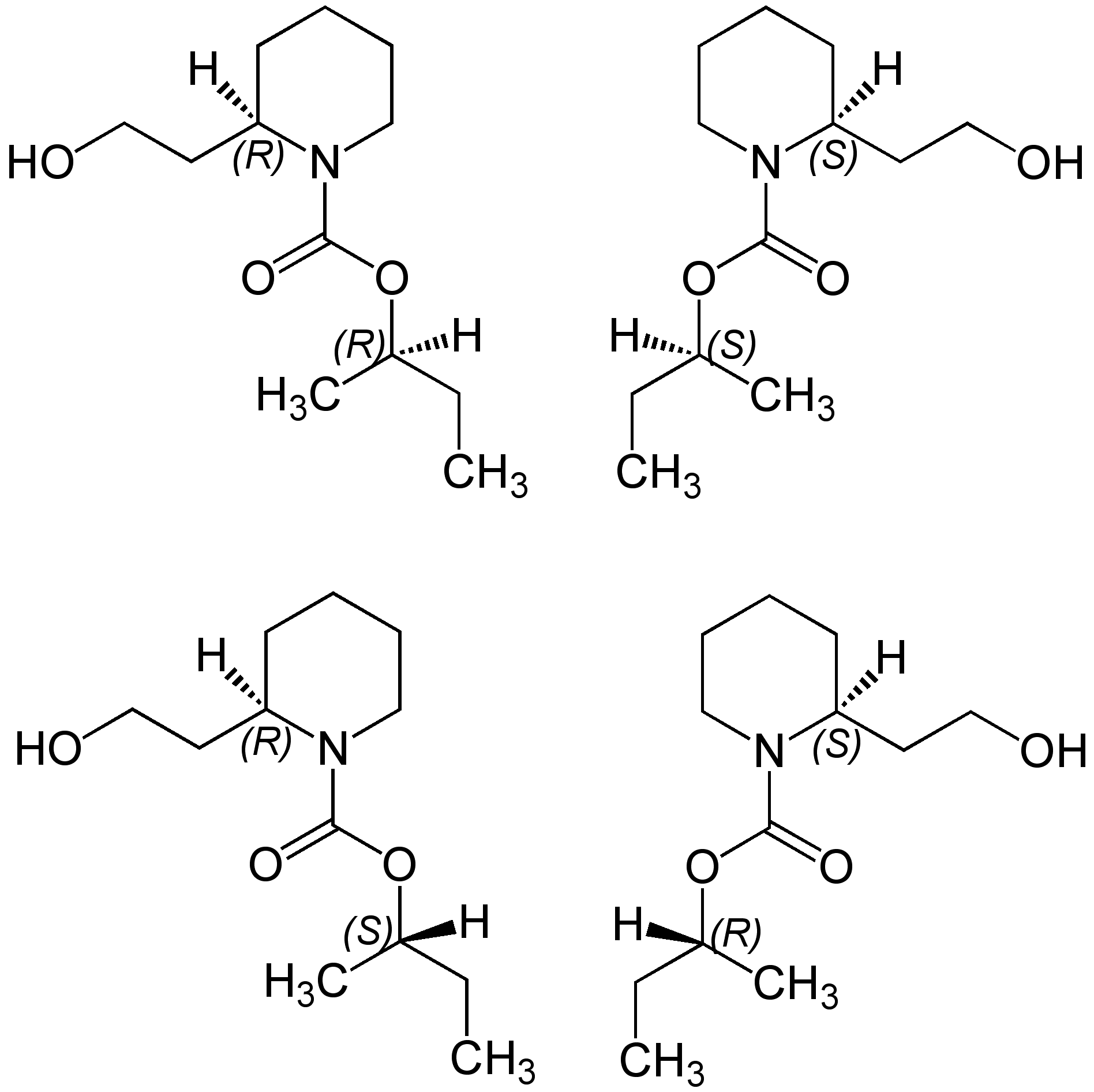
Stereoisomers of picaridin

Picaridin contains two stereocenters: one where the hydroxyethyl chain attaches to the ring, and one where the sec-butyl attaches to the oxygen of the carbamate. The commercial material contains a mixture of all four stereoisomers.

== Commercial products ==
Commercial products containing picaridin include Hedgewitch Icaridin, Cutter Advanced, Muskol, Repeltec, Skin So Soft Bug Guard Plus, Sawyer Picaridin Insect Repellent, Off! FamilyCare, Autan, Smidge, PiActive and MOK.O.

== See also ==
- DEET
- Ethyl butylacetylaminopropionate (IR3535)
- Permethrin, a pyrethroid insecticide that can be applied to clothing to help prevent bites
- p-Menthane-3,8-diol (PMD)
- SS220, another substituted-piperidine insect repellent
