= P-Menthane-3,8-diol =

Chemical compound found in oil of lemon eucalyptus

p-Menthane-3,8-diol

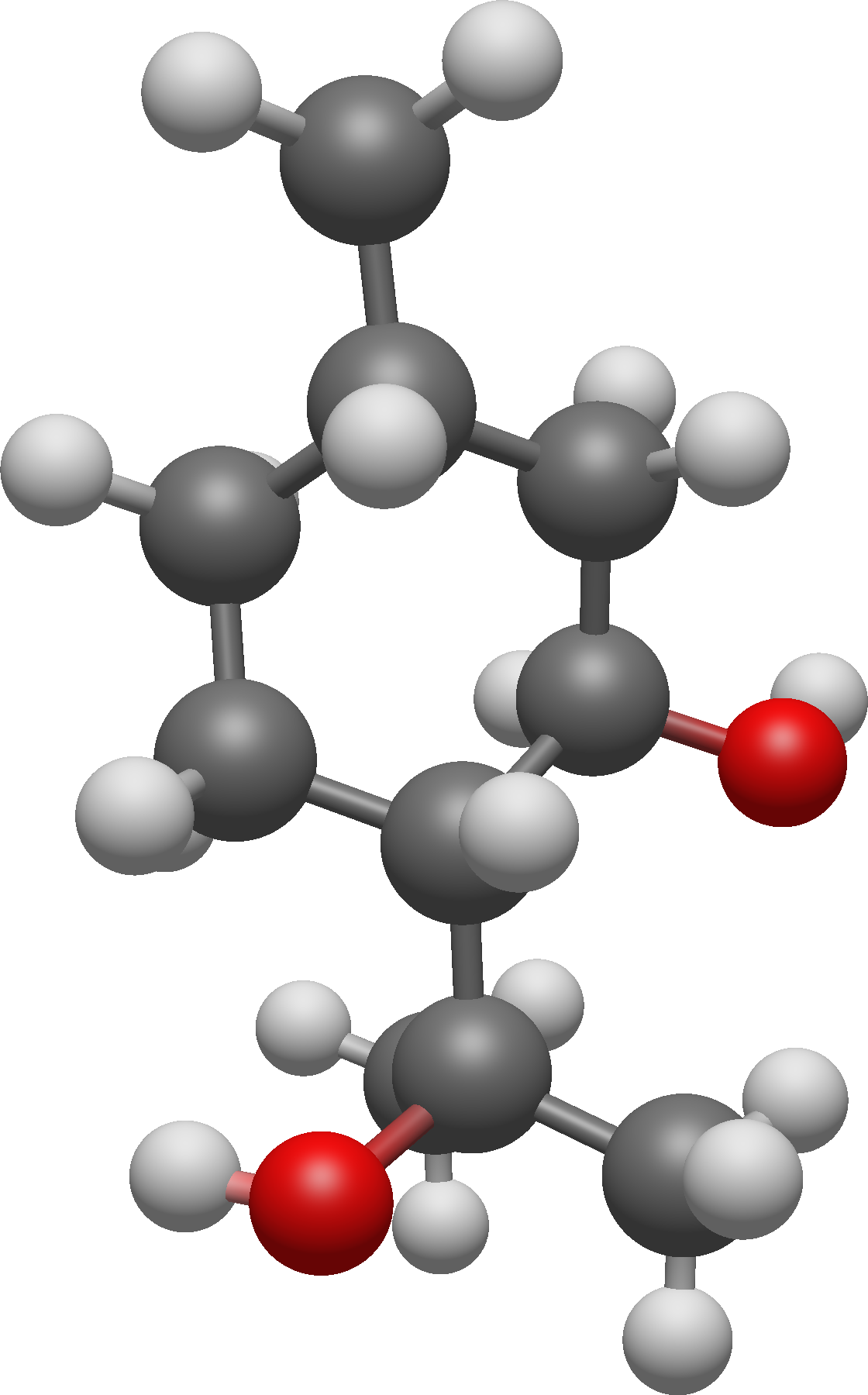

Names
- Preferred IUPAC name 2-(2-Hydroxypropan-2-yl)-5-methylcyclohexan-1-ol
- Other names 2-(1-Hydroxy-1-methylethyl)-5-methylcyclohexanol para-Menthane-3,8-diol; 2-Hydroxy-α,α,4-trimethylcyclohexanemethanol

Identifiers
CAS Number	42822-86-6
3D model (JSmol)	Interactive image
Beilstein Reference	2552262
ChEBI	CHEBI:48250
ChEMBL	ChEMBL3120644
ChemSpider	484204
ECHA InfoCard	100.050.849
EC Number	255–9537
KEGG	C02904
PubChem CID	556998
UNII	6T6Z1Z1NC4
CompTox Dashboard (EPA)	DTXSID0035744
- InChI: InChI=1S/C10H20O2/c1-7-4-5-8(9(11)6-7)10(2,3)12/h7-9,11-12H,4-6H2,1-3H3 Key: LMXFTMYMHGYJEI-UHFFFAOYSA-N; InChI=1/C10H20O2/c1-7-4-5-8(9(11)6-7)10(2,3)12/h7-9,11-12H,4-6H2,1-3H3 Key: LMXFTMYMHGYJEI-UHFFFAOYAL
- SMILES: OC(C1CCC(CC1O)C)(C)C

Properties
Chemical formula	C_{10}H_{20}O_{2}
Molar mass	172.268 g·mol^{−1}
Density	1.009 g/cm^{3}
- Except where otherwise noted, data are given for materials in their standard state (at 25 °C [77 °F], 100 kPa). verify (what is ?) Infobox references

p-Menthane-3,8-diol, also known as para-menthane-3,8-diol, PMD, citriodiol or geranodyle, is an organic compound classified as a diol and a terpenoid. It is colorless. Its name reflects the hydrocarbon backbone, which is that of p-menthane. A total of eight stereoisomers are possible, based on the three stereocenters of the ring. Depending on the source, one or more may predominate.

PMD is the active ingredient in some insect repellents. Its odor and chemical structure are similar to menthol, and it has a cooling feel. It is found in small quantities in the essential oil from the leaves of Corymbia citriodora, formerly known as Eucalyptus citriodora. This tree is native to Australia, but is now cultivated in many warm places around the world. C. citriodora oil, when refined to increase its PMD content for use in insect repellents, is known in the United States as oil of lemon eucalyptus (OLE) as well as Citriodiol. Citriodora oil contains only 1–2% PMD, while refined OLE contains approximately up to 70% PMD. Some commercial PMD products are not made from C. citriodora oil, but rather from synthetic citronellal.

== Effectiveness ==
A 2006 study showed that PMD used as a repellent is as effective as DEET when used in like quantities.

== Contraindications ==
PMD should not be used on children under 3 years of age.

== Interactions ==
Few if any studies have evaluated possible interactions when using PMD with sunscreens.

== Chemistry ==
There are eight possible stereoisomers. The exact composition is rarely specified and is commonly assumed to be a complex mixture. PMD can be synthesized by a Prins reaction of citronellal.

Refined OLE contains approximately up to 70% PMD, a mixture of the cis and trans isomers of p-menthane-3,8-diol, commonly known as citriodiol or geranodyle.

== History ==
Beginning in China in 1960, many plants were examined to find competent repellents. It was discovered that a waste material from the extraction of lemon eucalyptus oil functioned as an effective mosquito repellent. The main component of this material was p-menthene-diol-3,8.

OLE has been notified under the European Biocidal Products Directive (BPD) 98/8/EC (now BPR Regulation (EU) No. 528/212) under its generic name "PMD rich botanic oil" and is currently proceeding through the registration process with the Health and Safety Executive in the UK. It is also registered with Canada's Pest Management Regulatory Agency under the generic name "PMD and related oil of lemon eucalyptus compounds".

== See also ==
- DEET
- Ethyl butylacetylaminopropionate (IR3535)
- Icaridin
- Permethrin, a pyrethroid insecticide that can be applied to clothing to help prevent bites
