= DEET =

Insect repellent

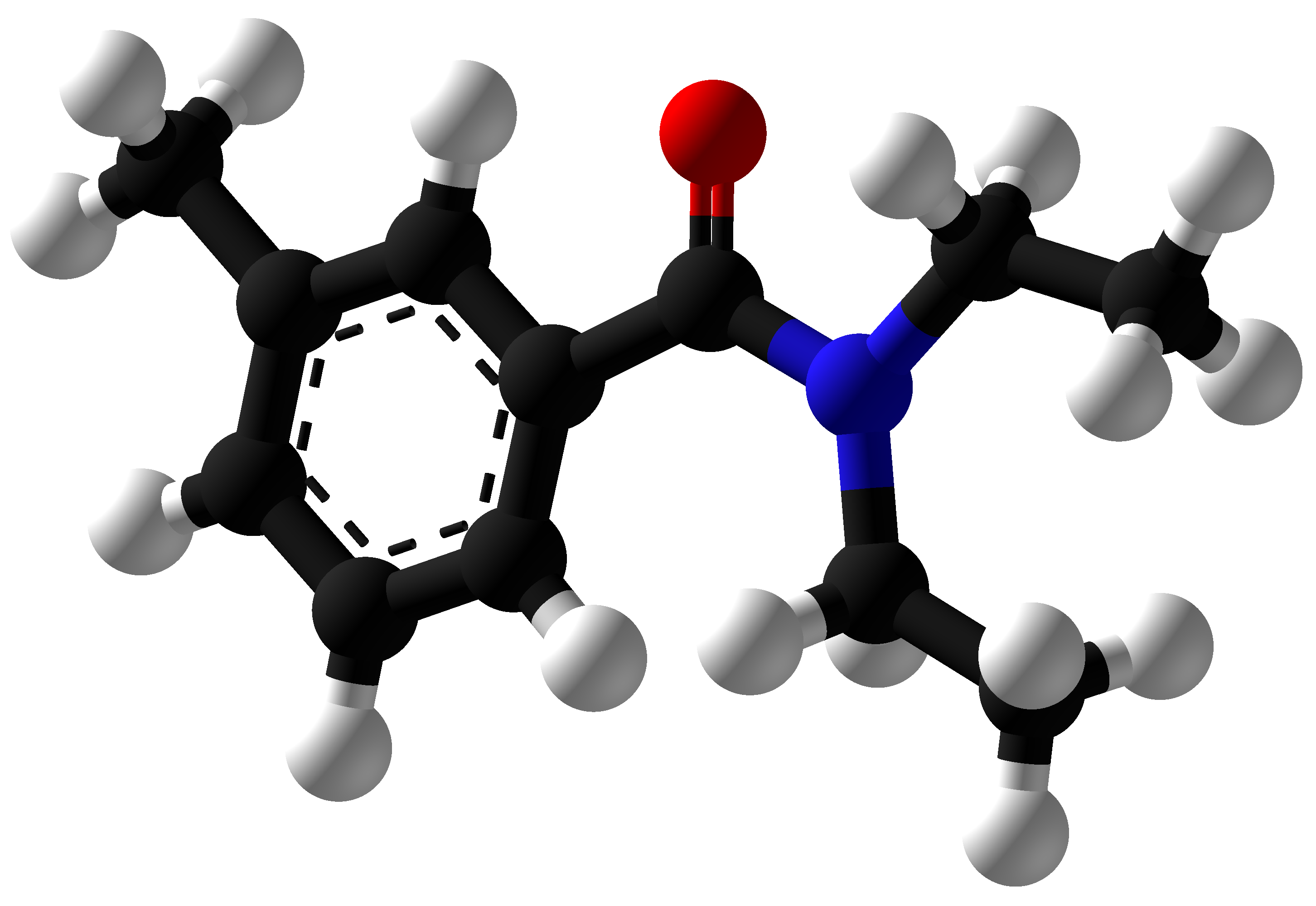

Names
- Preferred IUPAC name N,N-Diethyl-3-methylbenzamide
- Other names N,N-Diethyl-m-toluamide

Identifiers
CAS Number	134-62-3
3D model (JSmol)	Interactive image
ChEBI	CHEBI:7071
ChEMBL	ChEMBL1453317
ChemSpider	4133
ECHA InfoCard	100.004.682
KEGG	D02379
PubChem CID	4284
UNII	FB0C1XZV4Y
CompTox Dashboard (EPA)	DTXSID2021995
- InChI: InChI=1S/C12H17NO/c1-4-13(5-2)12(14)11-8-6-7-10(3)9-11/h6-9H,4-5H2,1-3H3 Key: MMOXZBCLCQITDF-UHFFFAOYSA-N; InChI=1S/C12H17NO/c1-4-13(5-2)12(14)11-8-6-7-10(3)9-11/h6-9H,4-5H2,1-3H3 Key: MMOXZBCLCQITDF-UHFFFAOYAE
- SMILES: O=C(c1cc(ccc1)C)N(CC)CC

Properties
Chemical formula	C_{12}H_{17}NO
Molar mass	191.27 g/mol
Density	0.998 g/mL
Melting point	−33 °C (−27 °F; 240 K)
Boiling point	288 to 292 °C (550 to 558 °F; 561 to 565 K)

Pharmacology
ATC code	P03BX02 (WHO) QP53GX01 (WHO)

Hazards
- GHS labelling
Pictograms	(GHS07: Exclamation mark)
Signal word	Danger
Hazard statements	H302, H315, H319, H402
NFPA 704 (fire diamond)	2 1 0
Safety data sheet (SDS)	External MSDS
- Except where otherwise noted, data are given for materials in their standard state (at 25 °C [77 °F], 100 kPa). verify (what is ?) Infobox references

N,N-Diethyl-meta-toluamide, also called diethyltoluamide or DEET (/diːt/, from DET, the initials of di- + ethyl + toluamide), is the oldest active ingredient, and one of the most effective and common, in commercial insect repellents. It is a colorless to slightly yellow oil intended to be applied to the skin or to clothing and provides protection against mosquitoes, biting flies, ticks, fleas, chiggers, and leeches.

== Effectiveness ==
DEET is effective against a variety of invertebrates, including ticks, flies, mosquitos, and some parasitic worms.

A 2018 systematic review found no consistent performance difference between DEET and Picaridin in field studies and concluded that they are equally preferred mosquito repellents, noting that 50% DEET offers longer protection but is not available in some countries.

=== Concentrations ===
The concentration of DEET in products may range from less than 10% to nearly 100%, but concentrations greater than 50% do not increase the duration of protection. Higher concentrations can be safely applied to clothing, although it may damage some types of synthetic fibers. The United Kingdom's publicly funded healthcare system, the National Health Service (NHS), recommends that UK citizens should use a concentration of 50% when visiting areas of the world with malaria. A lower concentration of 10% is recommended for infants and children. Health Canada decided in 2002 to limit DEET concentration to 30% in the country from the end of 2004 due to an increased long-term health risk observed with repeated applications.

DEET is often sold and used in spray or lotion in concentrations up to 100%. Consumer Reports report a correlation between DEET concentration and duration of protection against insect bites, but not how effective the protection is. Other research has corroborated the effectiveness of DEET as an insect repellent. The Centers for Disease Control and Prevention (CDC) recommends 30–50% DEET to prevent the spread of pathogens carried by insects.

A 2008 study found that higher concentrations of DEET have an improved ability to repel insects through fabric.

== Contraindications ==
The CDC recommends that DEET should not be used on children younger than 2 months of age.

== Adverse effects ==
When used as directed, products containing between 10% and 30% DEET have been found by the American Academy of Pediatrics to be safe to use on children as well as adults.

As a precaution, manufacturers advise that DEET products should not be used under clothing or on damaged skin, and that preparations be washed off after they are no longer needed or between applications. DEET can irritate the eyes and, unlike icaridin, it can cause breathing difficulty, headaches, or, in rare cases, it may cause severe epidermal reactions.

The authors of a 2002 study published in The New England Journal of Medicine wrote:

this repellent has been subjected to more scientific and toxicologic scrutiny than any other repellent substance. ... DEET has a remarkable safety profile after 40 years of use and nearly 8 billion human applications. Fewer than 50 cases of serious toxic effects have been documented in ... medical literature since 1960 ... Many of these cases of toxic effects involved long-term, heavy, frequent, or whole-body application of DEET. No correlation has been found between the concentration of DEET used and the risk of toxic effects. ... When applied with common sense, DEET-based repellents can be expected to provide a safe as well as a long-lasting repellent effect ... under circumstances in which it is crucial to be protected against arthropod bites that might transmit disease.

Individuals, due to their jobs, may require large exposure to DEET. In 1997, the Pesticide Information Project of Cooperative Extension Offices of Cornell University stated that "Everglades National Park employees having extensive DEET exposure were more likely to have insomnia, mood disturbances and impaired cognitive function than lesser exposed co-workers". This review includes the case of a "young male who repeatedly applied Deet to his skin prior to spending prolonged periods in a sauna [and] was reported to develop acute manic psychosis characterized by aggressive behavior, delusions and hyperactivity".

Citing human health reasons, Health Canada barred the sale of insect repellents for human use that contained more than 30% DEET in a 2002 re-evaluation "based on a human health risk assessment that considered daily application of DEET over a prolonged period of time". The agency recommended that DEET-based products be used on children between the ages of 2 and 12 only if the concentration of DEET is 10% or less and that repellents be applied no more than 3 times a day, children under 2 should not receive more than 1 application of repellent in a day and DEET-based products of any concentration should not be used on infants under 6 months.

A 2020 study performed by students within the University of Florida's College of Public Health and Health Professions analyzed data from the National Health and Nutrition Examination Survey and identified 1,205 participants who had "DEET metabolic levels recorded at or above detection limits". They analyzed biomarkers related to systemic inflammation, immune, liver, and kidney functions, and found no "evidence that DEET exposure has any impact on the biomarkers identified".

=== Carcinogenicity ===
Regulatory and international health authorities have not classified DEET as a carcinogen. The U.S. Environmental Protection Agency (EPA) categorizes DEET as Group D ("not classifiable as to human carcinogenicity"), based on a lack of mutagenicity in multiple assays and no significant increase in tumor incidence in long‑term animal studies. The same Health Canada study referenced above found that "DEET was not found to be mutagenic, nor was it carcinogenic in either rats or mice." The European Chemicals Agency (ECHA) has reviewed DEET and assigned classifications for acute toxicity, irritation, and environmental hazard only—no carcinogenic, mutagenic, or reproductive toxicity hazards were identified.

== Overdose ==
Applying DEET to the skin is safe if done as directed. Adverse reactions are very rare, about 1 in 100 million people. However, repeated use of DEET in very high concentrations can lead to toxic encephalopathy with severe neurological symptoms including seizures, tremors and slurred speech. The risk is higher for children since they have a greater surface area to body weight ratio.

=== Detection in body fluids after swallowing ===
DEET may be measured in blood, plasma, or urine by gas or liquid chromatography-mass spectrometry to confirm a diagnosis of poisoning by ingestion (swallowing) of large quantities of DEET in hospitalized patients or to provide evidence in a medicolegal death investigation. Blood or plasma DEET concentrations are expected to be in a range of 0.3–3.0 mg/L during the first 8 hours after dermal application in persons using the chemical appropriately, >6 mg/L in intoxicated patients and >100 mg/L in victims of acute intentional oral overdose.

== Interactions ==
Limited data indicates that combining insect repellents with DEET and sunscreen decreases the sun protection factor of the sunscreen by about a third. Unlike icaridin, the combination also increases the absorption of both significantly. When the two need to be used together, the repellent should be applied after the sunscreen has been absorbed, about 30 or more minutes later.

When DEET is used in combination with insecticides for cockroaches it can strengthen the toxicity of carbamate insecticides. These 1996 findings indicate that DEET has neurological effects on insects in addition to known olfactory effects, and that its toxicity is strengthened in combination with insecticides.

== Damage to materials ==
Unlike picaridin, DEET is an effective solvent and may dissolve some watch crystals, plastics, rayon, spandex, other synthetic fabrics, and painted or varnished surfaces, including nail polish. It also may act as a plasticizer by remaining inside some formerly hard plastics, leaving them softened and more flexible. DEET is incompatible with rayon, acetate, or dynel clothing.

== Environmental impact ==
Though DEET is not expected to bioaccumulate, it has been found to have a slight toxicity for fresh-water fish such as rainbow trout and tilapia, and it also has been shown to be toxic for some species of freshwater zooplankton. DEET has been detected at low concentrations in water bodies as a result of production and use, such as in the Mississippi River and its tributaries, where a 1991 study detected levels varying from 5 to 201 ng/L.

A 1975 study analyzed the effects of DEET on communities of freshwater organisms native to Chinese waterways and found that DEET was moderately toxic to aquatic organisms compared to other commercial insect repellants. The most-at-risk organisms were algae colonies which often experienced "significant biomass decline and community composition shift[s]" when exposed to DEET at 500 ng/L.

DEET is biodegraded by fungi into products less toxic to zooplankton. It degrades well under aerobic conditions, but poorly and slowly under anaerobic conditions.

== Mechanism of action ==
DEET is thought to provide protection from mosquitos via two pathways, both by confusing or inhibiting mosquito odorant receptors at a distance, and by being repellant to mosquito chemoreceptors upon contact because of the bitterness of DEET. The exact mechanisms are still being researched, but the two most likely hypotheses are the "smell and avoid hypothesis" (that DEET has an unpleasant odor to insects), and the "bewilderment hypothesis" (that smelling DEET confuses insects). An alternative hypothesis is that DEET "masks" humans by reducing the volatility of skin odorants that are attractive to insects. Mosquitoes can also be repelled by DEET via contact with chemosensory hairs on their legs.

== Synthesis ==
A slightly yellow liquid at room temperature, it can be prepared by converting m-toluic acid (3-methylbenzoic acid) to the corresponding acyl chloride using thionyl chloride (SOCl_{2}), and then allowing this acyl chloride to react with an excess of diethylamine:

== History ==
DEET was developed in 1944 by Samuel Gertler of the United States Department of Agriculture for use by the United States Army, following its experience of jungle warfare during World War II. It was originally tested as a potential agricultural insecticide, but entered military use in 1946 and civilian use in 1957. It was used in Vietnam and Southeast Asia.

A mixture of 75% DEET and 25% ethanol known as "bug juice" was originally used by soldiers but was later replaced by a novel formulation containing DEET and a mixture of polymers designed to reduce the evaporation rate of DEET. This extended-release formulation was registered by the Environmental Protection Agency in 1991.

== See also ==
- Anthranilate-based insect repellents
- Beautyberry
- Citronella oil
- DDT, an insecticide used for disease vector control
- Ethyl butylacetylaminopropionate (IR3535)
- Lemon eucalyptus
- Mosquito coil
- p-Menthane-3,8-diol (PMD)
- Permethrin, a pyrethroid insecticide that can be applied to clothing to help prevent bites
- SS220
