= Pedrowygomyia =

Scientific classification
- Kingdom: Animalia
- Phylum: Arthropoda
- Class: Insecta
- Order: Diptera
- Family: Simuliidae
- Tribe: Prosimuliini
- Genus: Pedrowygomyia; Miranda-Esquivel and Coscarón, 1998

Species
- See Text

Genus of flies

Pedrowygomyia is a genus of neotropical simuliid flies erected in 1998 from the Gigantodax cortesi species group of the 1925 genus Gigantodax after a cladistics analysis of the species groups recognized in the genus indicated that it was paraphyletic. The genus was named in recognition of the contributions to science of entomologist Petr Wolfgang Wygodzinsky. Pedrowygomyia originally comprised four species, P. cortesi, P. jatunchuspi, P. punapi and P. chacabamba, all described in 1989 from high-elevation (above 3,000 m) areas in the Andean region. In 2020, a new species, P. hanaq, was described from the south-central Andes of Peru at an altitude above 4,000 m. Based on the pupal stage, the new species appears to be most closely related to P. punapi, a species known from Argentina, Bolivia, and Chile.
