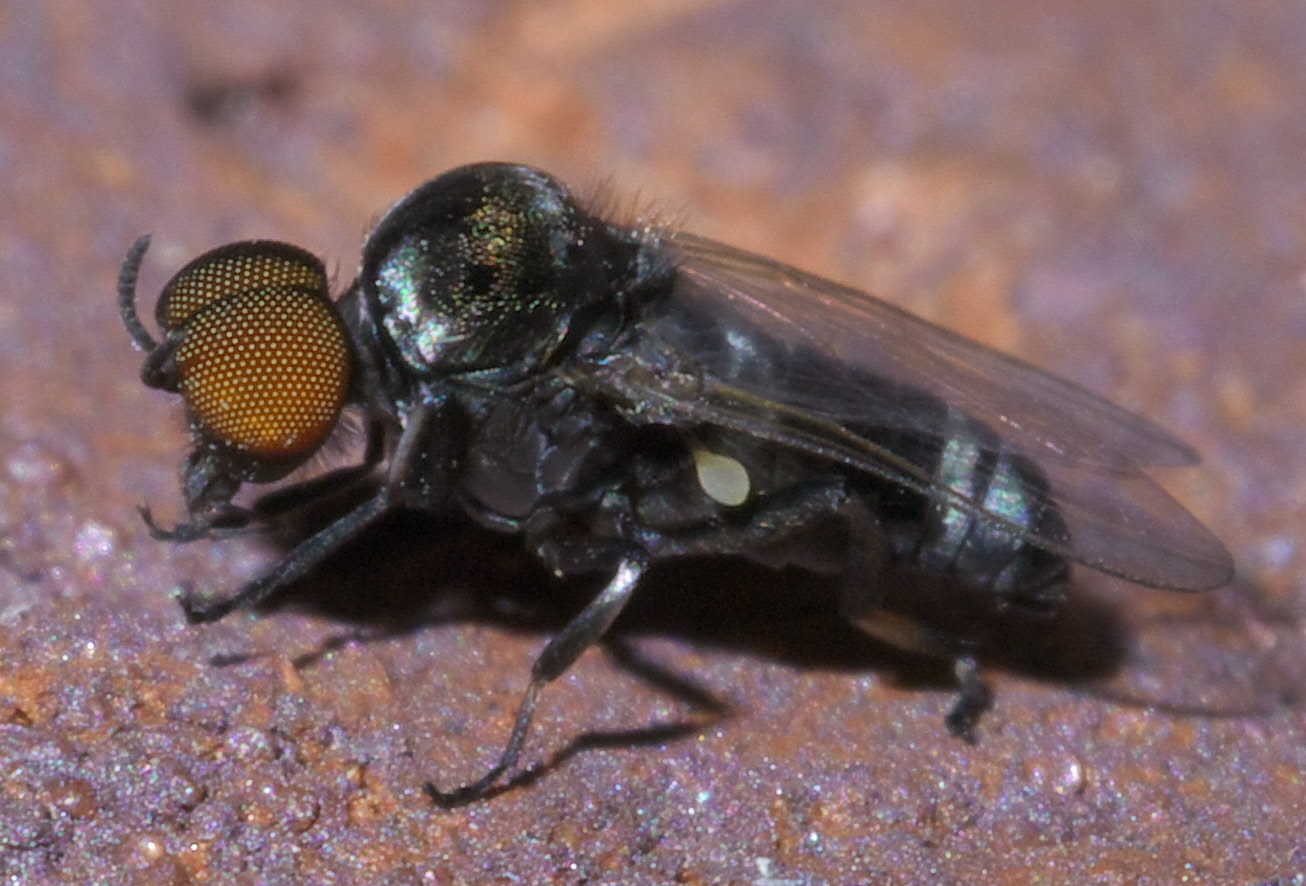
- Simulium spp.

Scientific classification
- Kingdom: Animalia
- Phylum: Arthropoda
- Class: Insecta
- Order: Diptera
- Family: Simuliidae
- Subfamily: Simuliinae
- Tribe: Simuliini; Latreille, 1802

Type genus
- Simulium Latreille, 1802

Genera
- See text.

Synonyms
- Nevermanniini Enderlein, 1921; Wilhelmiini Baranov, 1926; Ectemniinae Enderlein, 1930; Stegopterninae Enderlein, 1930; Cnesiinae Enderlein, 1934; Friesiini Enderlein, 1936; Odagmiini Enderlein, 1936; Austrosimuliini Smart, 1945; Cnephiini Grenier & Rageau, 1960; Eusimuliini Rubtsov, 1974

= Simuliini =

Tribe of black flies

The Simuliini is a tribe of black flies that contains over 2,000 species, with more than 1,800 in the genus Simulium. There are 19 living genera, and three genera only known from Cretaceous fossils.

== Living genera ==
- Araucnephia Wygodzinsky & Coscarón, 1973
- Araucnephioides Wygodzinsky & Coscarón, 1973
- Austrosimulium Tonnoir, 1925
- Cnephia Enderlein, 1921
- Cnesia Enderlein, 1934
- Cnesiamima Wygodzinsky & Coscarón, 1973
- Crozetia Davies, 1965
- Ectemnia Enderlein, 1930
- Gigantodax Enderlein, 1925
- Greniera Doby & David, 1959
- Lutzsimulium D’Andretta & D’Andretta, 1947
- Metacnephia Crosskey, 1969
- Paracnephia Rubtsov, 1962
- Paraustrosimulium Wygodzinsky & Coscarón, 1962
- Pedrowygomyia Coscarón & Miranda-Esquivel, 1998
- Simulium Latreille, 1802
- Stegopterna Enderlein, 1930
- Sulcicnephia Rubtsov, 1971
- Tlalocomyia Wygodzinsky & Díaz Nájera, 1970

== Fossil genera ==
- Archicnephia Currie & Grimaldi, 2000
- Baisomyia Kalugina, 1991
- Gydarina Kalugina, 1991
