= Araucnephia =

Scientific classification
- Kingdom: Animalia
- Phylum: Arthropoda
- Class: Insecta
- Order: Diptera
- Family: Simuliidae
- Tribe: Simuliini
- Genus: Araucnephia; Wygodzinsky & Coscarón, 1973

Type species
- A. montana (Philippi, 1865)

Species
- See Text.

Genus of flies

Araucnephia is a genus of South American black flies from Chile and Argentina. There are only 2 known species.

== Species ==
- A. iberaensis Coscarón & Coscarón-Arias, 2002
- A. montana (Philippi, 1865)
