= Charimachilis =

Scientific classification
- Kingdom: Animalia
- Phylum: Arthropoda
- Clade: Pancrustacea
- Class: Insecta
- Order: Archaeognatha
- Family: Machilidae
- Genus: Charimachilis; Wygodzinsky, 1939

Genus of jumping bristletails

Charimachilis is a genus of the family Machilidae which belongs to the insect order Archaeognatha (jumping bristletails). They are found in southern and eastern Europe.

== Species ==
- Charimachilis armata Stach, 1958
- Charimachilis caucasicus Kaplin, 1999
- Charimachilis dentata Wygodzinsky, 1941
- Charimachilis manfredoniae Kaplin 2010
- Charimachilis orientalis (Silvestri, 1908)
- Charimachilis palaestinensis Wygodzinsky, 1939
- Charimachilis relicta Janetschek, 1954 (Full: Charimachilis relicta relicta)
  - Charimachilis relicta egatensis Bach, 1982
  - Charimachilis relicta insularis Janetschek, 1957
  - Charimachilis relicta melitensis Stach, 1958
  - Charimachilis relicta meridionalis Janetschek, 1957
- Charimachilis ukraniensis Stach, 1958
- Charimachilis wahrmani Wygodzinsky, 1959
