= Greniera (disambiguation) =

Greniera is a genus of flies in the family Simuliidae.

Greniera may also refer to:

- Greniera (plant), a genus of flowering plants in the family Caryophyllaceae; synonym of Arenaria
- Greniera, a small village located in Tshopo province in the Democratic Republic of the Congo
