= Stegopterna mutata =

Scientific classification
- Domain: Eukaryota
- Kingdom: Animalia
- Phylum: Arthropoda
- Class: Insecta
- Order: Diptera
- Family: Simuliidae
- Genus: Stegopterna
- Species: S. mutata

Binomial name
- Stegopterna mutata (Malloch, 1914)

Synonyms
- Eusimulium permutatum Dyar and Shannon, 1927; Prosimulium mutatum (Malloch, 1914)

Species of fly

Stegopterna mutata, the mutated black fly, is a species of black flies (insects in the family Simuliidae).
