= Novaustrosimulium =

Scientific classification
- Kingdom: Animalia
- Phylum: Arthropoda
- Clade: Pancrustacea
- Class: Insecta
- Order: Diptera
- Family: Simuliidae
- Genus: Austrosimulium
- Subgenus: Novaustrosimulium; Dumbleton, 1973

Species
- See text

Subgenus of flies

Novaustrosimulium is a subgenus of Austrosimulium, a genus made up of black flies. The flies in this subgenus are found exclusively in Australia.

== Species ==
- A. bancrofti Taylor, 1918 (type species)
- A. furiosum Skuse, 1889
- A. magnum Mackerras & Mackerras, 1955
- A. pestilens Mackerras & Mackerras, 1948
- A. torrentium Tonnoir, 1925
- A. victoriae Roubaud, 1906
