= List of Prosimulium species =

This is a list of 111 species in the genus Prosimulium.

== Prosimulium species ==
- Prosimulium aculeatum Rivosecchi, 1963
- Prosimulium albense Rivosecchi, 1961
- Prosimulium albertense Peterson and Depner, 1972
- Prosimulium albionense Rothfels, 1956
- Prosimulium alpestre Dorog., Rubtzov, and Vlasenko, 1935
- Prosimulium approximatum Peterson, 1970
- Prosimulium arvum Adler and Kim, 1985
- Prosimulium asema (Rubtsov, 1956)
- Prosimulium aurantiacum (Tonnoir, 1925)
- Prosimulium barnardi (Gibbins, 1938)
- Prosimulium brincki (Meillon, 1955)
- Prosimulium calabrum Rivosecchi, 1966
- Prosimulium canutum Adler, Currie & Wood, 2004
- Prosimulium caudatum Shewell, 1959
- Prosimulium clandestinum Adler, Currie & Wood, 2004
- Prosimulium clavatum Peterson, 1970
- Prosimulium constrictistylum Peterson, 1970
- Prosimulium damarense Meillon & Hardy, 1951
- Prosimulium daviesi Peterson and Defoliart, 1960
- Prosimulium decemarticulatum (Twinn, 1936)
- Prosimulium dicentum Dyar and Shannon, 1927
- Prosimulium dicum Dyar and Shannon, 1927
- Prosimulium diminutum Rubtsov, 1956
- Prosimulium doveri Sommerman, 1962
- Prosimulium erythronotum Rubtsov, 1956
- Prosimulium esselbaughi Sommerman, 1964
- Prosimulium exigens Dyar and Shannon, 1927
- Prosimulium faurei Bertrand & Grenier, 1972
- Prosimulium fergusoni (Tonnoir, 1925)
- Prosimulium flaviantennum (Stains and Knowlton, 1940)
- Prosimulium fontanum Syme and Davies, 1958
- Prosimulium formosum Shewell, 1959
- Prosimulium frohnei Sommerman, 1958
- Prosimulium frontatum Terteryan, 1956
- Prosimulium fulvipes (Edwards, 1921)
- Prosimulium fulvithorax Shewell, 1959
- Prosimulium fulvum (Coquillett, 1902)
- Prosimulium fuscoflava (Mackerras & Mackerras, 1948)
- Prosimulium fuscum Syme and Davies, 1958
- Prosimulium gibsoni (Twinn, 1936)
- Prosimulium gigas Rubtsov, 1956
- Prosimulium harrisoni (Freeman & Meillon, 1953)
- Prosimulium herero (Enderlein, 1935)
- Prosimulium hirtipes (Fries, 1824)
- Prosimulium idemai Adler, Currie & Wood, 2004
- Prosimulium impostor Peterson, 1970
- Prosimulium irritans Rubtsov, 1940
- Prosimulium isos Rubtsov, 1956
- Prosimulium italicum Rivosecchi, 1967
- Prosimulium jacuticum Rubtsov, 1973
- Prosimulium jeanninae Peterson, 1990
- Prosimulium jezonicum (Matsumura, 1931)
- Prosimulium johannseni
- Prosimulium juccii (Contini, 1966)
- Prosimulium kanii Uemoto, Onishi & Orii, 1973
- Prosimulium kiotoense Shiraki, 1935
- Prosimulium kolymense Patrusheva, 1975
- Prosimulium laamii Saguez & Choumara, 1981
- Prosimulium latimucro (Enderlein, 1925)
- Prosimulium liaoningense Sun & Xue, 1994
- Prosimulium longilobum Peterson and Defoliart, 1960
- Prosimulium longirostrum Currie, Adler & Wood, 2004
- Prosimulium luganicum Rubtsov, 1956
- Prosimulium macropyga (Lundstrom, 1911)
- Prosimulium magnum Dyar and Shannon, 1927
- Prosimulium martini Peterson, 1970
- Prosimulium maruashvili Machavariani, 1966
- Prosimulium minifulvum Adler, Currie & Wood, 2004
- Prosimulium mixtum Syme & Davies, 1958 (mixed-up black fly)
- Prosimulium morotoense (McCrae & Prentice, 1965)
- Prosimulium multidentatum (Twinn, 1936)
- Prosimulium muspratti (Freeman & Meillon, 1953)
- Prosimulium mysticum Peterson, 1970
- Prosimulium neomacropyga Peterson, 1970
- Prosimulium onychodactylum Dyar and Shannon, 1927
- Prosimulium opleri Peterson & Kondratieff, 1994
- Prosimulium orientalis (Mackerras & Mackerras, 1950)
- Prosimulium perspicuum Sommerman, 1958
- Prosimulium petrosum Rubtsov, 1955
- Prosimulium pilfreyi (Davies & Gyorkos, 1988)
- Prosimulium pleurale Malloch, 1914
- Prosimulium pronevitschae Rubtsov, 1955
- Prosimulium rhizomorphus Rubtsov, 1971
- Prosimulium rhizophorum Stone and Jamnback, 1955
- Prosimulium rhodesianum Crosskey, 1968
- Prosimulium rufipes (Meigen, 1830)
- Prosimulium rusticum Adler, Currie & Wood, 2004
- Prosimulium saltus Stone and Jamnback, 1955
- Prosimulium secretum Adler, Currie & Wood, 2004
- Prosimulium shewelli Peterson and Defoliart, 1960
- Prosimulium strenua (Mackerras & Mackerras, 1950)
- Prosimulium subrufipes Knoz, 1980
- Prosimulium susanae Peterson, 1970
- Prosimulium terebrans (Tonnior, 1925)
- Prosimulium thornei (Meillon, 1955)
- Prosimulium tiksiense Yankovsky, 1996
- Prosimulium tomosvaryi (Enderlein, 1921)
- Prosimulium tonnoiri (Drummond, 1931)
- Prosimulium transbrachium Alder and Kim, 1985
- Prosimulium travisi Stone, 1952
- Prosimulium tredecimfistulatum Rubtsov, 1956
- Prosimulium tridentatum Rubtsov, 1940
- Prosimulium turneri (Gibbins, 1938)
- Prosimulium uinta Peterson and Defoliart, 1960
- Prosimulium umbratorum (Tonnoir, 1925)
- Prosimulium unicum (Twinn, 1938)
- Prosimulium unispina Rubtsov, 1967
- Prosimulium ursinum (Edwards, 1935)
- Prosimulium vernale Shewell, 1952
- Prosimulium woodorum Peterson, 1970
- Prosimulium wui Peterson & Kondratieff, 1994
