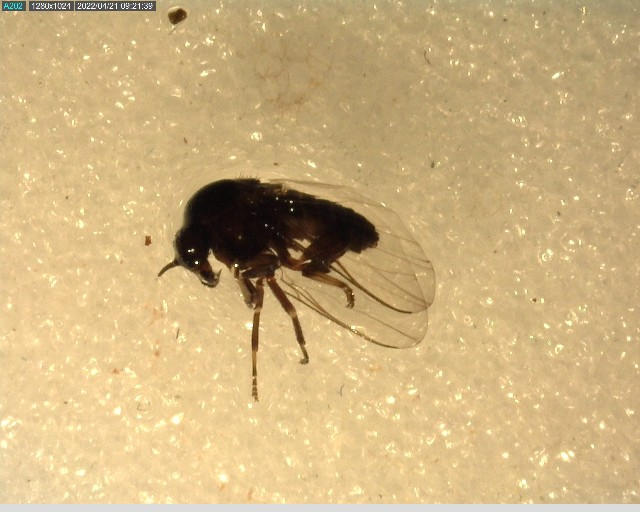

Scientific classification
- Kingdom: Animalia
- Phylum: Arthropoda
- Clade: Pancrustacea
- Class: Insecta
- Order: Diptera
- Family: Simuliidae
- Genus: Austrosimulium
- Subgenus: Austrosimulium
- Species: A. ungulatum

Binomial name
- Austrosimulium ungulatum Tonnoir, 1925

= Austrosimulium ungulatum =

Species of fly

Austrosimulium ungulatum, the West Coast black fly, is a species of small fly in the family Simuliidae (the black flies). It is endemic to New Zealand, where it occurs in the South Island and Stewart Island. Simuliids in New Zealand are known locally as "sandflies" and, in Māori, as "namu". The species was first formally described in 1925 by Belgian entomologist André Léon Tonnoir. The females take blood meals to obtain nutrients for egg production. They are known to feed on the blood of Fiordland penguins, and spread the blood parasite Leucocytozoon tawaki to them. It is one of three New Zealand Austrosimulium species that commonly bite humans, and is notorious for doing so prolifically. In their larval stage, they live in small, well-shaded streams that have a cool temperature, where they are preyed on by fish such as the torrentfish.

== Taxonomy ==
This species was first described in 1925 by Belgian entomologist André Léon Tonnoir from female specimens. The holotype is stored in the New Zealand Arthropod Collection (formerly in the Cawthron Institute insect collection). In 1972, entomologist Lionel Jack Dumbleton published a taxonomic revision of the species in which he described the adult, pupa and larva. The species was most recently revised in 2012. Although Tonnoir did not explain the reason for the specific name, it is presumed to refer to the female's toothed claw.

The species' standard common name as decided by the Entomological Society of New Zealand is "West Coast black fly". While "black flies" is the name for simuliids in the rest of the world, "sandflies" is the universally used popular name in New Zealand. Elsewhere, "sandfly" often refers to biting Psychodidae or Ceratopogonidae. In New Zealand, however, the term is used almost exclusively for simuliids because there are no biting psychodids and only one biting ceratopogonid, Leptoconops myersi, which is little known. The Māori language word for Austrosimulium in general is namu.

== Description ==
The adults of Austrosimulium ungulatum can be distinguished from all other Austrosimulium by the combination of toothed tarsal claws, white halteres and the base of the first flagellomere being pale. Their bodies are predominantly black and covered in a whitish, dust-like coating. The abdomen varies somewhat from dark yellow-brown to dark brown-black. The adult female bodies are 2.7–3.4 mm long and have a wing length of 2.8–3.2 mm, whereas the males are 2.5–3.0 mm and have wings 3.1 mm long. Adult males of New Zealand Austrosimulium are very rarely captured in the wild, and the 2012 description of adult males of A. ungulatum was based on adults still in the pupa and one reared adult. There have been records of gynandromorphy (individuals having both male and female characteristics) occurring in the species. In one study, out of roughly 17,625 specimens of A. ungulatum, nine were gynandromorphs.

Larvae at the final instar are 5.3–6.0 mm long. The body is continuously even in diameter and is generally greyish and brown. The head is patterned blotchy brown, has distinctive spots and the suboesophageal ganglion (a bundle of nerves in the underside of the head) is colourless. The ventral tubercles, rounded projections on the underside of the abdomen near the tip, are marked. The semicircular sclerite (a structure at the tip of the abdomen) tapers towards the end.

The pupae are 3.1–3.7 mm long. The head plate is covered in faint ridges, with the plate being more rounded in males and broader in females. The upper surface of the body is smooth. Filaments of the gills lack black horn (hardened growths) at their base and may be bifurcated (splitting in two), some almost as long as the body. The number of gill filaments ranges from 9 to 13. On the abdomen there are hooks and two setae (hairs) on the ninth sternite (plate on the underside of the body). The fabric of the cocoon is roughly constructed and coloured brown, with two thin projections at the end. These projections curve at their tip.

== Distribution and habitat ==
They are found in most regions of the South Island and on Stewart Island, prolifically in some regions and less so in others, and not known from the North Island. They are almost absent from the east coast plains and Banks Peninsula, but have been found at Kaituna. In the West Coast region, there is a gap of less than 100 km in the distribution of A. ungulatum that corresponds to the South Island "beech gap", a well-known discontinuity in beech-dominated forest, despite the area being climatically suitable for beech. It has been proposed that A. ungulatum does not occur in this zone due to unsuitable habitat.

Immature specimens have been found from sea level to 990 metres above sea level, and adults have been collected at up to 1,200 metres. The larval stages of the fly prefer small streams with heavy forest shade, which keeps the water cool. They tend to be found in waters with summer temperatures of 9.5 to 17.0 °C and pH levels of 6.1 to 8.0.

== Life history ==
The females deposit their eggs in streams. It has been proposed that the broad life history strategy of Austrosimulium ungulatum is to produce adults in low densities at numerous localities, then disperse (usually downstream) and aggregate at lower altitudes around river mouths and beaches where they can feed on their hosts' blood. The adults appear to emerge daily. It is likely that the species reproduces several times a year, as the adults are present year round.

== Diet ==
Adult simuliids, both male and female, feed on sugars for flight energy. It is not known what sugar sources are used by New Zealand Austrosimulium; possibilities include nectar, honeydew and sap.

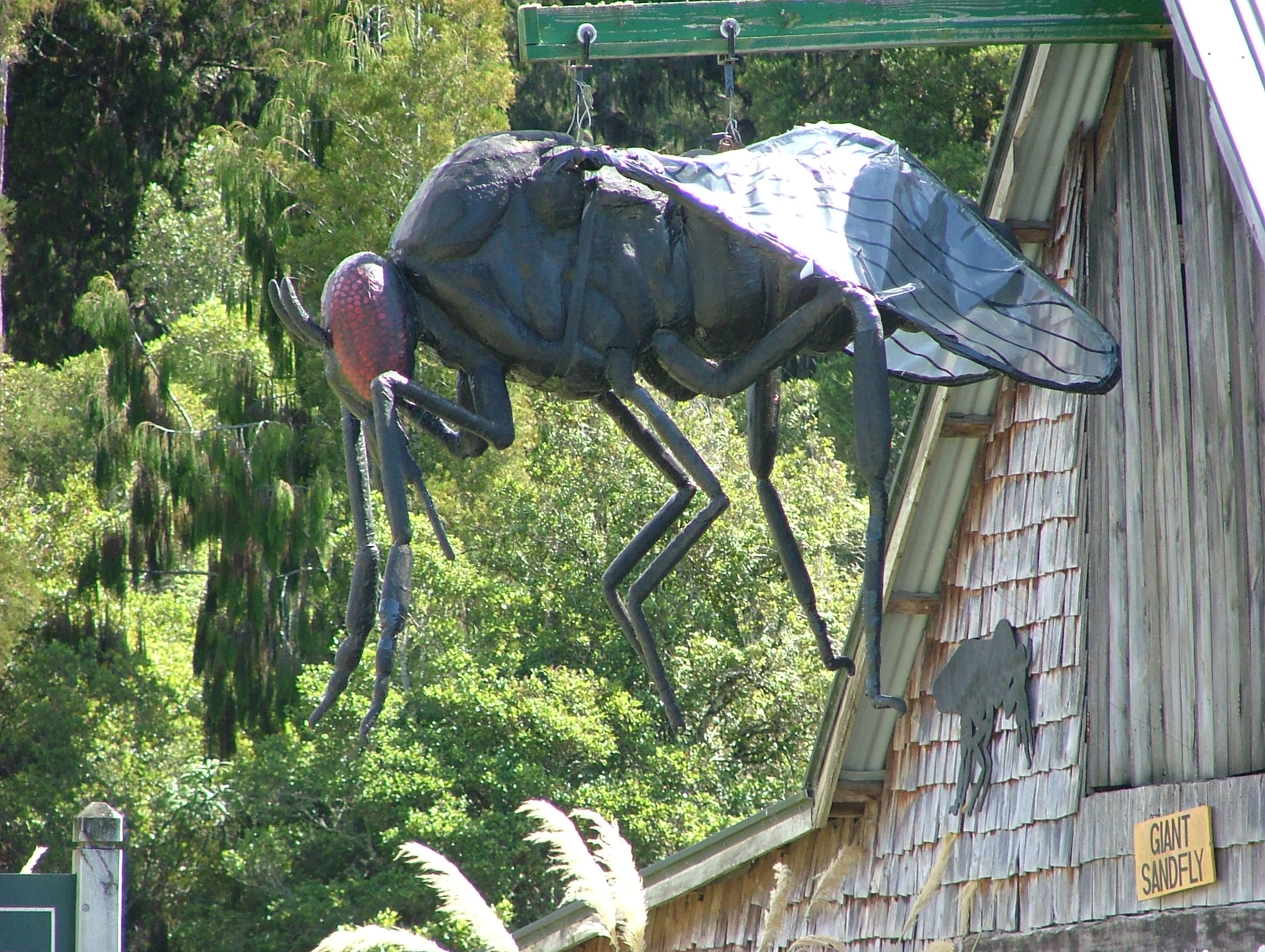
Sculpture of A. ungulatum at the Bushman's Cafe, Pukekura, Westland, 2005

Female adult New Zealand Austrosimulium bite vertebrates and consume their blood in order to obtain nutrients for producing eggs. It is presumed that before the arrival of humans they took their blood meals from birds and probably also seals. The abundance of A. ungulatum at beaches may be because they are instinctively searching for a blood meal from seabirds or seals. The only bird or seal species they are known to feed on, though, is the Fiordland penguin (Eudyptes pachyrhynchus). They bite the penguins most just after dawn and just before sunset. In experimental conditions, they are equally attracted to the odours of ducklings, humans and Fiordland penguins, indicating they do not feed on the penguins only.

A. ungulatum is a serious biter of humans, along with only two other New Zealand Austrosimulium – A. australense and A. tillyardianum. A. ungulatum will fly long distances to obtain blood. They bite humans prolifically, often at a rate of 1,000 per hour, especially just before sunset or before rain, and have been recorded biting at a rate equivalent to 4,000 an hour. They are so notorious, especially in the West Coast and Fiordland regions, that they have been depicted in sculptures at the Milford Sound visitor centre and a cafe in Pukekura (although this one is no longer present).

== Predators and parasites ==
The larvae are preyed on by fish such as the torrentfish and common river galaxias. Austrosimulium adults or larvae in general are preyed on by a wide range of predators, including native birds, fish, aquatic isopods and chironomid (non-biting midge) larvae. As larvae, A. ungulatum are parasitised by Coelomycidium (a type of fungus) and Austromermis (a type of nematode worm).

== Disease transmission ==
Austrosimulium ungulatum is one of several species of Austrosimulium that are known vectors of Leucocytozoon tawaki, a protozoan blood parasite that infects the Fiordland penguin. The blood parasite is spread between individuals by A. ungulatum feeding on the blood of multiple individuals. The sexual cycle of the parasite has been recorded occurring in the fly. Chicks of the penguin are typically infected 2–3 weeks after hatching, roughly when they move away from the nest and are more exposed to the flies. A. ungulatum that fed on heavily infected penguins had a higher mortality rate than those that fed on lightly infected penguins, indicating this parasite is harmful to the fly too.

In laboratory settings, A. ungulatum is ineffective at becoming infected by arboviruses from feeding on infected hosts. Some acquired viruses were able to multiply in the fly, but they never concentrated around the salivary glands and thus would be ineffective at spreading the viruses to hosts via biting. Because of this, it is unlikely they are biological vectors of certain arboviruses. However, it is possible that they could act as mechanical vectors (meaning the virus does not reproduce in the fly) and could directly transfer viruses between individuals, akin to how an unclean needle can transfer diseases between people.
