= Prosimulium mixtum =

Scientific classification
- Domain: Eukaryota
- Kingdom: Animalia
- Phylum: Arthropoda
- Class: Insecta
- Order: Diptera
- Family: Simuliidae
- Genus: Prosimulium
- Species: P. mixtum

Binomial name
- Prosimulium mixtum Syme & Davies, 1958

Species of fly

Prosimulium mixtum, the mixed-up black fly, is a species of black flies (insects in the family Simuliidae).
