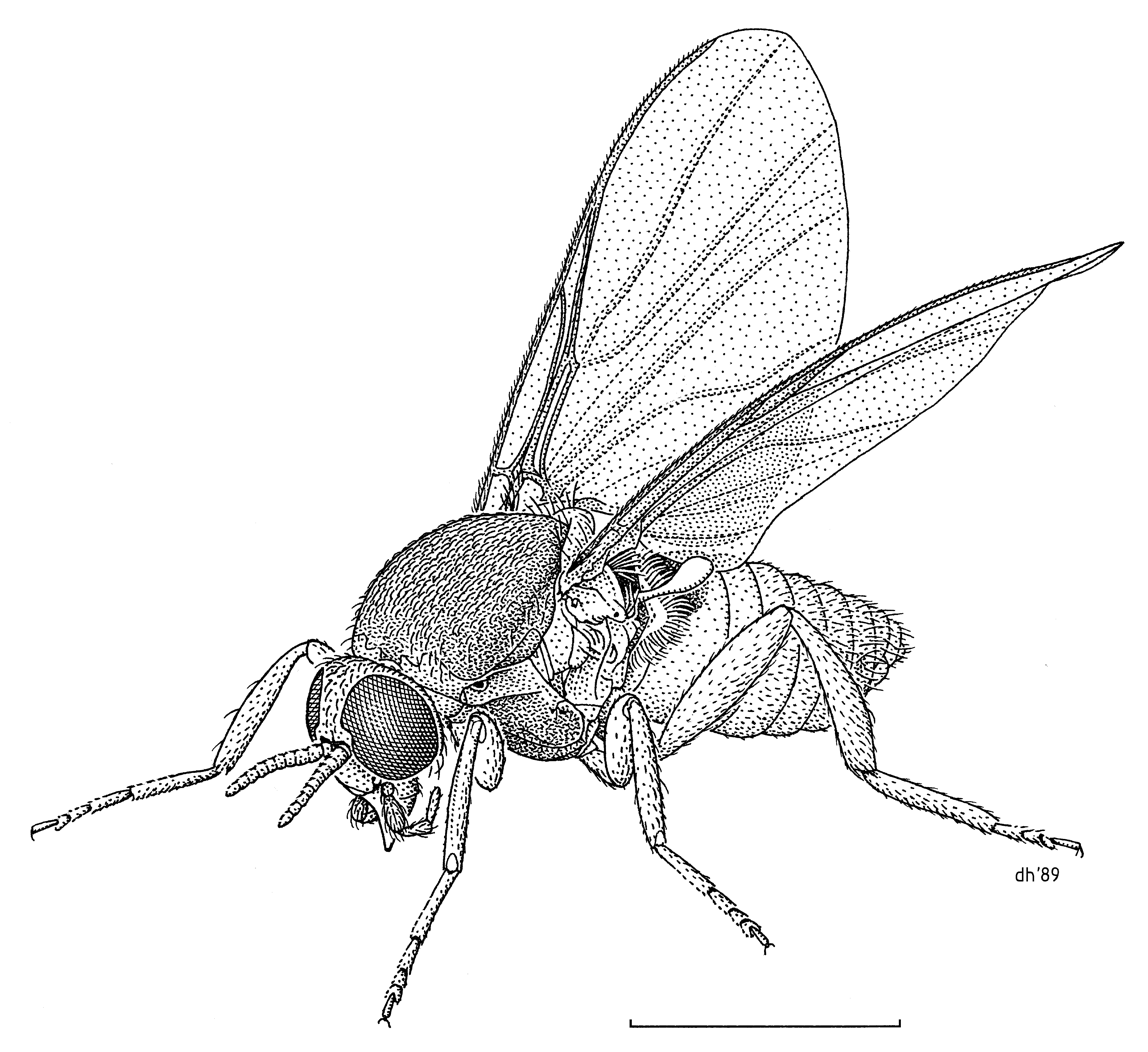
- Austrosimulium australense

Scientific classification
- Kingdom: Animalia
- Phylum: Arthropoda
- Clade: Pancrustacea
- Class: Insecta
- Order: Diptera
- Family: Simuliidae
- Subfamily: Simuliinae
- Tribe: Simuliini
- Genus: Austrosimulium; Tonnoir, 1925

Type species
- Austrosimulium australense (Schiner, 1868)

= Austrosimulium =

Genus of flies

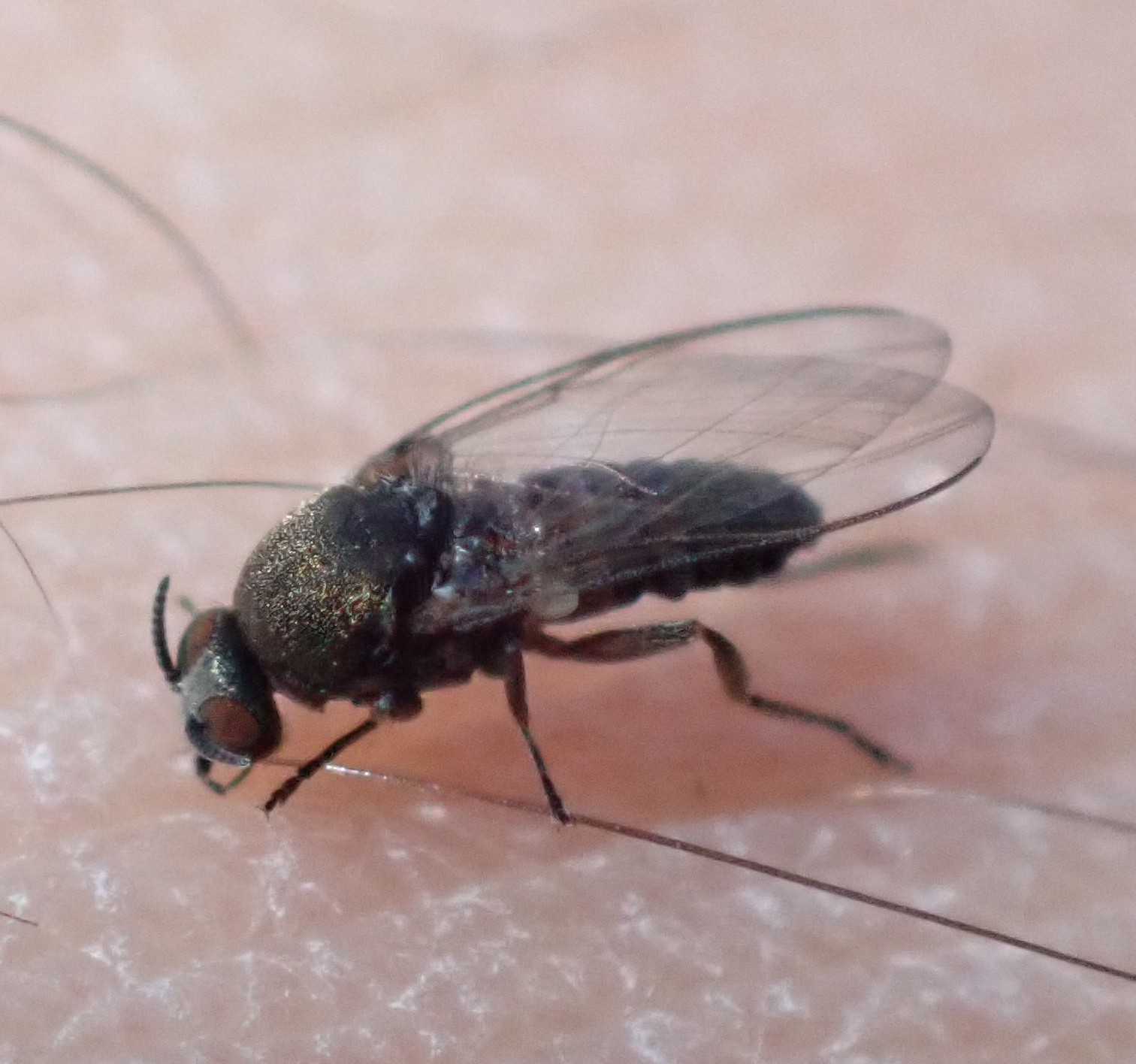
Austrosimulium australense, New Zealand

Austrosimulium is a genus of about 30 species of black flies that are distributed in Australia and New Zealand. There are 2 subgenera: Austrosimulium whose species are principally from New Zealand, and Novaustrosimulium which are exclusively Australian. Austrosimulium is a sister genus to the monospecific Paraustrosimulium of South America.

Some species are known to spread the protozoan blood parasite Leucocytozoon tawaki in penguins.

In New Zealand, where they are known as sandflies or namu (in Māori from Proto-Austronesian *ñamuk "mosquito", compare with Malay: nyamuk), three species – A. australense, A. tillyardianum and A. ungulatum – bite humans.

== Species ==
These 30 species belong to the genus Austrosimulium:

Subgenus Austrosimulium Tonnoir, 1925
Austrosimulium albovelatum Dumbleton, 1973 (New Zealand (South Island))
Austrosimulium alveolatum Dumbleton, 1973 (New Zealand (South Island))
Austrosimulium australense (Schiner, 1868) (New Zealand, Stewart Island)
Austrosimulium bicorne Dumbleton, 1973 (New Zealand (South Island))
Austrosimulium campbellense Dumbleton, 1973 (Campbell Island)
Austrosimulium cornutum Tonnoir, 1925 (Australia (Victoria, NSW, Tasmania))
Austrosimulium crassipes Tonnoir, 1925 (Australia (Victoria, NSW, Queensland))
Austrosimulium dugdalei Craig, Craig & Crosby, 2012 (New Zealand (North Island))
Austrosimulium dumbletoni Crosby, 1976 (New Zealand (South Island))
Austrosimulium extendorum Craig, Craig & Crosby, 2012 (New Zealand (Stewart Island))
Austrosimulium fiordense Dumbleton, 1973 (New Zealand (South Island))
Austrosimulium fulvicorne Mackerras & Mackerras, 1950 (Australia (Queensland))
Austrosimulium laticorne Tonnoir, 1925 (New Zealand (South Island))
Austrosimulium longicorne Tonnoir, 1925 (New Zealand)
Austrosimulium mirabile Mackerras & Mackerras, 1948 (Australia (Queensland))
Austrosimulium montanum Mackerras & Mackerras, 1952 (Australia (NSW, Victoria))
Austrosimulium multicorne Tonnoir, 1925 (New Zealand (South Island))
Austrosimulium stewartense Dumbleton, 1973 (New Zealand (Stewart Island, South Island))
Austrosimulium tillyardianum Dumbleton, 1973 (New Zealand)
Austrosimulium tonnoiri Craig, Craig & Crosby, 2012 (New Zealand (South Island))
Austrosimulium ungulatum Tonnoir, 1925 (New Zealand (South Island, Stewart Island))
Austrosimulium unicorne Dumbleton, 1973 (New Zealand (South Island))
Austrosimulium vailavoense Craig, Craig & Crosby, 2012 (New Zealand (Stewart Island, South Island))
Austrosimulium vexans (Mik, 1881) (Auckland Islands)
Subgenus Novaustrosimulium Dumbleton, 1973
Austrosimulium bancrofti (Taylor, 1918) (Australia)
Austrosimulium furiosum (Skuse, 1889) (Australia)
Austrosimulium magnum Mackerras & Mackerras, 1955 (Australia (Queensland))
Austrosimulium pestilens Mackerras & Mackerras, 1948 (Australia (Queensland, NSW, Northern Territory))
Austrosimulium torrentium Tonnoir, 1925 (Australia (Tasmania, NSW, Victoria))
Austrosimulium victoriae (Roubaud, 1906) (Australia)
