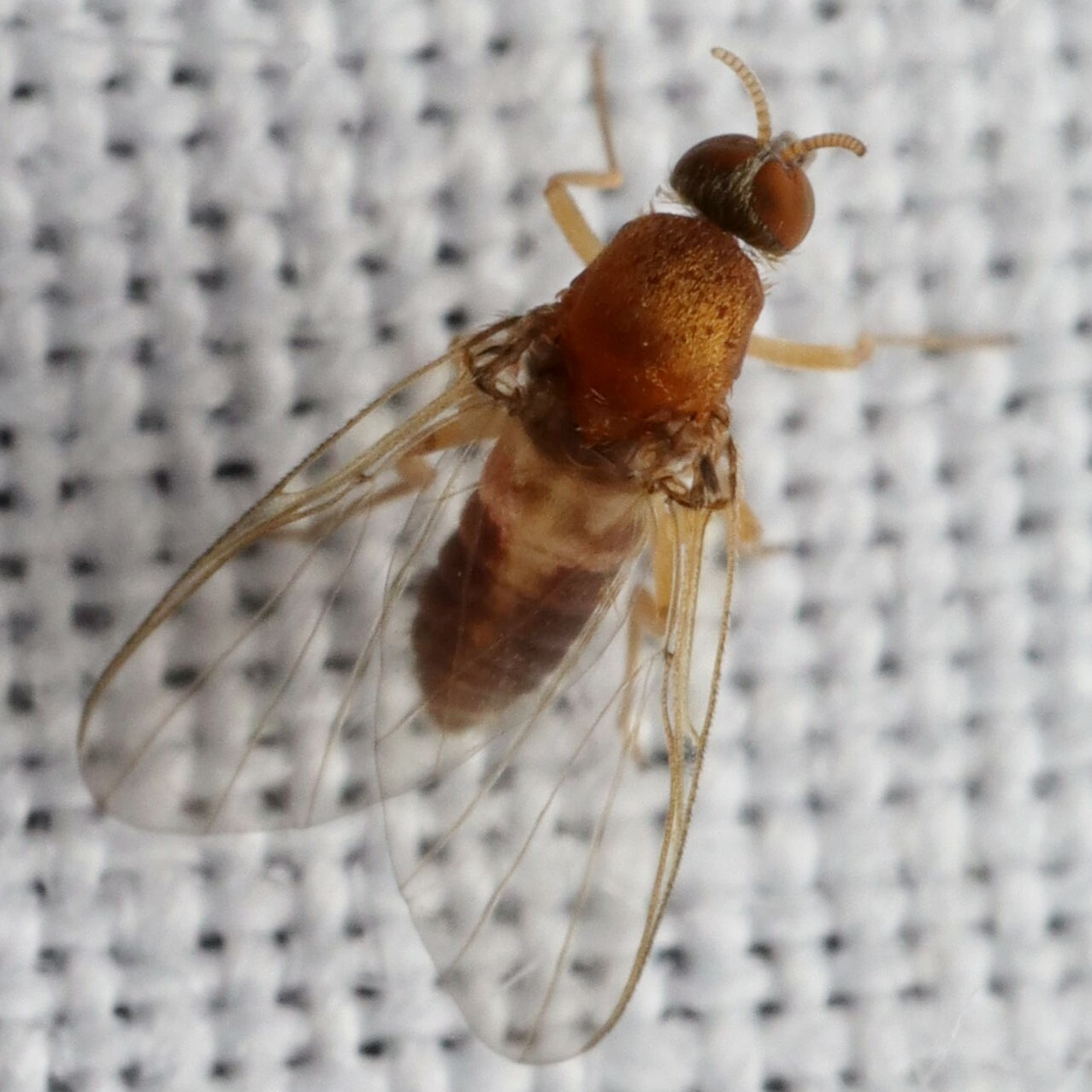

Scientific classification
- Kingdom: Animalia
- Phylum: Arthropoda
- Clade: Pancrustacea
- Class: Insecta
- Order: Diptera
- Family: Simuliidae
- Tribe: Simuliini
- Genus: Gigantodax; Enderlein, 1925

Type species
- G. bolivianus Enderlein, 1925

Species groups
- Brophyi; Cilicinus; Cormonsi; Igniculus; Minor; Multifilis; Wrighti

Synonyms
- Archicnesia Enderlein, 1934; Archinesia Enderlein, 1934 (incorrect spelling)

= Gigantodax =

Genus of flies

Gigantodax is a genus of 68 species of black flies distributed along the Andes from Mexico to Tierra del Fuego in Argentina.

== Taxonomy ==
The taxonomy of the genus was revised in 1989 by an academic paper published in the bulletin of the American Museum of Natural History. In 1997, researchers from the Universidad Nacional del Comahue in Rio Negro, Argentina collected larvae of G. marginalis and other fly species in Lanín National Park, Neuquén Province. After a close examination included chromosome mapping, they reported:

Females are not anthropophilic and can be found as well as in mountain creeks from sea level to 4,700 m of altitude (Wygodzinsky & Coscaron 1989). Gigantodax is a peculiar genus, showing the greatest diversity among the Prosimuliini genera, with synapomorphies in imago and preimaginal stages that help to differentiate species in this genus from other genera. The unusual morphology of the respiratory filaments in the pupal stage is useful in differentiating species.

These South American researchers also analyzed G. marginalis, G. fulvescens, and G. chilensis and reported that Cnesia, another Prosimuliini genus, is sympatric with southern populations of Gigantodax and that both genera breed on both sides of the Andean range in Argentina and Chile in subantarctic Patagonia. They also reported that Gigantodax species in this area are also sympatric with Simulium.

These genus was re-examined in 2007 by entomologists from the Universidade Federal do Rio de Janeiro in Brazil who explained that in their paper:

...the first phylogenetic hypothesis for the 13 Southern Hemisphere genera of Simuliidae is proposed, through a cladistic approach. In order to investigate the position of those genera representatives of five Northern Hemisphere genera were also included in the analyses as outgroups. The study was based on a data matrix with 33 terminal taxa and 119 morphological characters of adult, pupa and larva. The phylogenetic analysis under equal weights resulted in four most parsimonious trees, with similar topologies and 349 steps...

=== Species ===
- Brophyi species-group

- G. antarcticus (Bigot, 1888)
- G. awa Wygodzinsky & Coscarón, 1989
- G. brophyi (Edwards, 1931)
- G. chilensis (Philippi, 1865)
- G. femineus (Edwards, 1931)
- G. flabellus Wygodzinsky & Coscarón, 1989
- G. kuscheli Wygodzinsky, 1952
- G. laevigatus Wygodzinsky & Coscarón, 1989
- G. luispenai Wygodzinsky & Coscarón, 1989
- G. marginalis (Edwards, 1931)
- G. multituberculatus Wygodzinsky & Coscarón, 1989
- G. ortizi Wygodzinsky, 1974
- G. osornorum Muñoz de Hoyos, Martínez, Mejía & Bueno, 1995
- G. paramorum Wygodzinsky & Coscarón, 1989
- G. patihuaycensis Wygodzinsky & Coscarón, 1989
- G. rufidulus Wygodzinsky & Coscarón, 1989
- G. trifidus Wygodzinsky & Coscarón, 1989
- G. viannamartinsi Ramírez-Pérez, 1980
- G. zumbahuae Wygodzinsky & Coscarón, 1989

- Cilicinus species-group

- G. arrarteorum Wygodzinsky & Coscarón, 1989
- G. basinflatus Wygodzinsky & Coscarón, 1989
- G. cilicinus Wygodzinsky & Coscarón, 1989
- G. clandestinus Wygodzinsky & Coscarón, 1989
- G. destitutus Wygodzinsky & Coscarón, 1989
- G. fulvescens (Blanchard, 1852)
- G. incomitatus Wygodzinsky & Coscarón, 1989
- G. lazoi Takaoka, Hirai & Tada, 1988
- G. mariobordai Wygodzinsky & Coscarón, 1989
- G. pennipunctus Enderlein, 1934
- G. shannoni (Edwards, 1931)

- Cormonsi species-group

- G. abalosi Wygodzinsky, 1958
- G. brevis Wygodzinsky & Coscarón, 1989
- G. cormonsi Wygodzinsky & Coscarón, 1989
- G. gracilis Wygodzinsky & Coscarón, 1989
- G. leonorum Wygodzinsky & Coscarón, 1989
- G. misitu Wygodzinsky & Coscarón, 1989
- G. praealtus Wygodzinsky & Coscarón, 1989
- G. siberianus Wygodzinsky & Coscarón, 1989
- G. vulcanius Wygodzinsky & Coscarón, 1989
- G. wygodzinskyi Moncada, Muñoz de Hoyos & Bueno, 1981

- Igniculus species-group

- G. carmenae Wygodzinsky & Coscarón, 1989
- G. igniculus Coscarón & Wygodzinsky, 1962

- Minor species-group

- G. araucanius (Edwards, 1931)
- G. bolivianus Enderlein, 1925
- G. eremicus Wygodzinsky & Coscarón, 1989
- G. minor Wygodzinsky & Coscarón, 1989

- Multifilis species-group

- G. multifilis Wygodzinsky & Coscarón, 1989

- Wrighti species-group

- G. adleri Moulton, 1996
- G. aquamarensis (De León, 1945)
- G. bettyae Wygodzinsky, 1974
- G. bierigi Vargas & Ramírez-Pérez, 1989
- G. cervicornis Wygodzinsky, 1974
- G. conviti Ramírez-Pérez, 1980
- G. corniculatus Wygodzinsky, 1974
- G. cypellus Wygodzinsky & Coscarón, 1989
- G. dryadicaudicis Wygodzinsky & Coscarón, 1989
- G. herreri Wygodzinsky & Coscarón, 1989
- G. horcotiani Wygodzinsky, 1949
- G. impossibilis Wygodzinsky, 1974
- G. incapucara Wygodzinsky & Coscarón, 1989
- G. nasutus Wygodzinsky & Coscarón, 1989
- G. rufescens (Edwards, 1931)
- G. septenarius Wygodzinsky & Coscarón, 1989
- G. willei Vargas & Ramírez-Pérez, 1989
- G. wrighti (Vargas, Martínez Palacios & Díaz Nájera, 1944)

- Unplaced

- G. cuyano Coscarón, 1981
- G. dryadibranchium Coscarón, 1981
- G. pucara Coscarón, 1981
