= Ectemnia invenusta =

Scientific classification
- Kingdom: Animalia
- Phylum: Arthropoda
- Class: Insecta
- Order: Diptera
- Family: Simuliidae
- Genus: Ectemnia
- Species: E. invenusta

Binomial name
- Ectemnia invenusta (Walker, 1848)

Synonyms
- Cnephia invenusta (Walker); Cnephia loisae Stone and Jamnback, 1955; Simulium invenustum Walker, 1848

Species of fly

Ectemnia invenusta, the unattractive black fly, is a species of black flies in the family Simuliidae.
