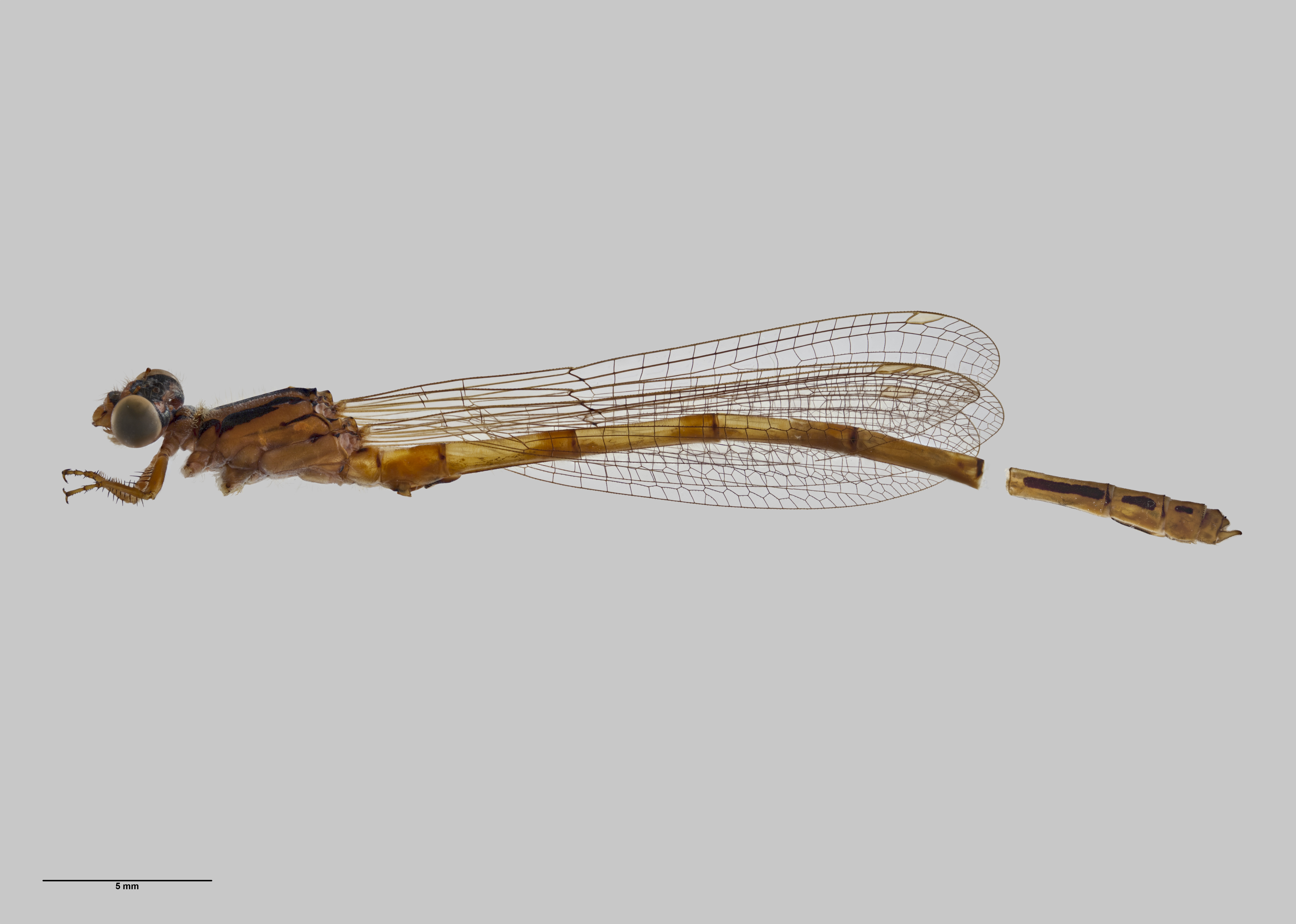
- Male holotype specimen held at the Auckland War Memorial Museum.
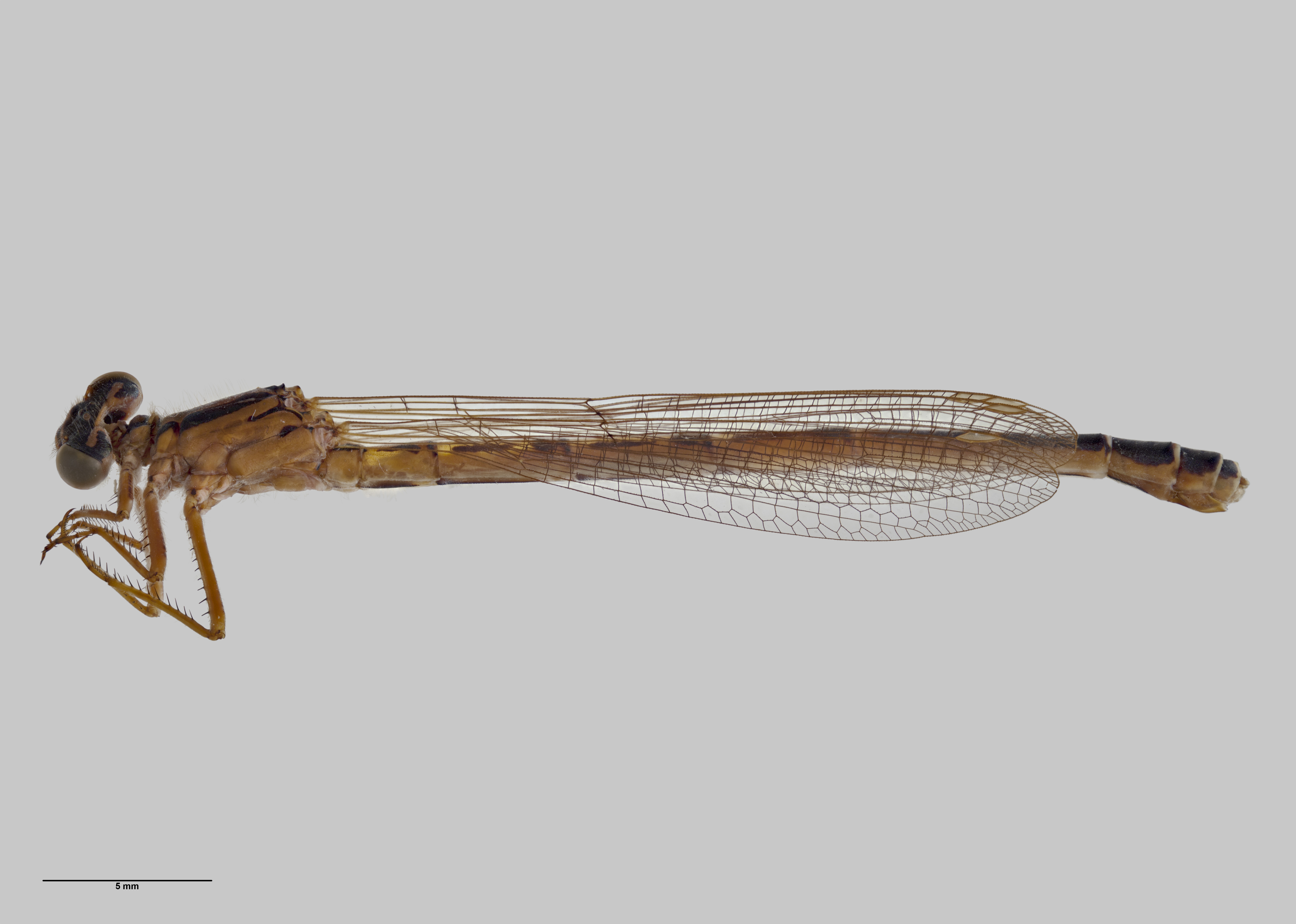
- Female allotype specimen held at the Auckland War Memorial Museum.

Conservation status
- Least Concern (IUCN 3.1)

Scientific classification
- Kingdom: Animalia
- Phylum: Arthropoda
- Class: Insecta
- Order: Odonata
- Suborder: Zygoptera
- Family: Coenagrionidae
- Genus: Xanthocnemis
- Species: X. zealandica

Binomial name
- Xanthocnemis zealandica (McLachlan, 1873)

Synonyms
- Telebasis zealandica McLachlan, 1873; Xanthocnemis sinclairi Rowe, 1987

= Xanthocnemis zealandica =

Species of damselfly

Xanthocnemis zealandica, commonly known as common redcoat damselfly, red damselfly, or red coat damselfly, is one of the most common native New Zealand damselflies. Adult damselflies are often seen flying around vegetation close to streams.

X. zealandica has a 2–3 year life cycle; the shorter one was observed near sea level while the longer one was characteristic to a mid-elevation site (579 m (1,900 ft) above sea level). Some individuals at the lowland sites may even complete their life cycle in one year. X. zealandica nymphs are widespread across New Zealand, occurring in rocky and weedy streams and ponds. It is predominantly a low-altitude species but can reach 1,945 m (6,381 ft) above sea level. The nymphs of the red damselfly are identified by their pointed tail gills and long hairs by the tip.

== Taxonomy ==
This species was first described by Robert McLachlan in 1873 and named Telebasis zealandica. Until 1981, it was the only species in the endemic New Zealand genus Xanthocnemis.

== Description ==
Xanthocnemis zealandica is the only predominantly red damselfly found in New Zealand. Its name is attributed to the bold red colour of the male, decorated with black markings. Female zealandica have different colour schemes, either bright red with black markings at the tip of the abdomen or black with yellow stripes along the side of the abdomen. However, the colour often varies from deep yellow to orange-red as the individual matures.

Damselflies are often confused with dragonflies, because they both belong to the order Odonata and share similar identifiable features. A major distinguishing factor between a damselfly and dragonfly is the wing position when resting on a surface: damselflies fold the wings vertical and upright, as opposed to dragonflies leaving them horizontal and spread out. Damselflies flutter more in flight, in comparison to the hovering speed of dragonflies. Therefore, damselflies tend to remain closer to the ground and stay close to their territory. Similar to their close relative, the damselfly can be determined by the noticeably large eyes disproportionate to their head, alongside distinct veins on the wings.

Male Xanthocnemis zealandica measure roughly 24–38 mm in length, with a wingspan of 15–23 mm, whereas the female zealandica tends to be slightly larger, measuring around 28–39 mm with a wingspan of 18–23 mm.

Xanthocnemis zealandica nymphs have a lack of resemblance in comparison to adult damselflies. Although they also have unproportionate eyes regarding the rest of their body, alongside well-developed legs. Xanthocnemis zealandica nymphs have no gills; therefore, they are only capable of breathing by pumping air out of the rectum. They are often identifiable by their caudal lamellae (gills), although considering their well-developed legs and gills, they are only capable of moving around in the water by wiggling their bodies to gain momentum. The larvae of the red damselfly are identified by their pointed tail gills and long hairs by the tip. Of the six species of damselfly in New Zealand, Xanthocnemis zealandica is the most common and easiest species to identify.

== Distribution and habitat ==
Xanthocnemis zealandica is an endemic native species of New Zealand and is widespread and common on North, South and Stewart Islands. It is usually abundant anywhere with clean, fresh running water. Xanthocnemis zealandica are capable of living within many habitats, so there is potential for this species to be present in every lake, swamp, pond and slow-moving stream in the North Island, South Island and Stewart Island. It is predominantly a low-altitude species but can reach 1,945 m (6,381 ft) above sea level.

== Habitat preferences ==
Xanthocnemis zealandica tends to be found near plants along the edges of lakes, flowing streams, rivers, swamps and ponds throughout the country. It can be found in brackish coastal water habitats to alpine tarns throughout New Zealand. Females tend to prefer laying their eggs in slow-moving water including ponds, lakes or puddles nearby a dominant river course. However, this will vary depending on whether they are living in the South Island or in the North Island. Females from the North Island often deposit their eggs in slow moving forest streams, whereas South Island females tend to avoid running water in general, favoring mountain tarns instead.

== Life cycle and phenology ==
X. zealandica has a 2–3 year life cycle; the shorter one was observed near sea level while the longer one was characteristic to a mid-elevation site (579 m (1,900 ft) above sea level). Some individuals at the lowland site may even complete their life cycle in one year. The Xanthocnemis zealandica life cycle is incomplete metamorphosis, with the three major lifecycle stages consisting of egg, nymph and adult.

Xanthocnemis zealandica has a unique approach to copulation during mid-summer months, consisting of the male and female grasping each other whilst extending their bodies to form a heart-like shape. The reproductive strategy is oviparous iteroparous, meaning they lay eggs with little or no significant embryonic development within the mother, and the mother has multiple reproductive cycles, allowing females to mate more than once in a lifetime. Copulation often takes place in the air, demonstrating their incredible flying ability. The male Xanthocnemis zealandica extends his lower abdomen forwards to store a packet of sperm in his middle abdomen region, in place for the female to bend back her lower abdomen to retrieve the packet of sperm. This process tends to be broad in timescale, taking from a few minutes up to several hours. Adults are most active at high air temperatures and they are not active when the temperature of the air falls below 14 °C. Mature females deposit one egg at a time, just below water level, whereas mature males patrol these areas and sometimes form swarming groups.

The lifecycle of Xanthocnemis zealandica begins as the female lays her eggs in a nearby freshwater stream, depositing the eggs into slits in aquatic plants below the water surface or the surrounding swampy ground. In some cases, the female can be completely submerged for up to 30 minutes, while the male fends off other males competing for the female. Unlike dragonflies, the damselfly eggs are cylindrical in shape. Depending on the climate and water temperature, the eggs may take longer to hatch, waiting until the water temperature rises to ensure the survival of the nymphs. Once the eggs hatch in late spring – early summer the nymphs spend two years of their life among aquatic vegetation preying on smaller species while they grow. In comparison to dragonflies, damselfly require fewer moults and a shorter duration in the aquatic environment. Once ready to leave the water, the nymph crawls up stems of surrounding vegetation, clay or stones, molts out of its aquatic shell and rests until its fresh wings are dried and stiffened, allowing it to eventually take flight for the first time. This transition usually commences in the morning and can take many hours to complete.

Due to the lack of practice in the air, young adults are incredibly vulnerable in the open landscape, causing them to retreat and hide amongst grassy areas for a few days, as this provides protection from surrounding predators. Once mature around mid-October to mid-March, they return to the water and hunt within a set territory, amongst the bankside and aquatic vegetation. However, at night, they retreat 10–20 m from the water edge to seek shelter and protection, perched amongst vegetation.

== Diet, prey and predators ==
Diet and foraging

All species of damselfly in New Zealand are carnivorous, preying on caddisfly, moths, aphids and crane flies as a food source. The main diet of Xanthocnemis zealandica consists of Culicidae and Simuliidae. They catch their prey while in flight, extending out their long bristly legs to form a basket, enabling the ability to scoop up smaller insects mid-flight and direct them into its jaws. Due to their sharp mouthparts, they can cut up the prey into bite-size pieces. Adults are successful predators in the air due to their acute vision and eyes containing around 10,000–30,000 individual facets, therefore making them extremely aware of surrounding motion. Male X. zealandica can be very territorial when it comes to hunting. They often chase off other damselflies that enter their hunting territory, which usually consists of roughly a 15 square metre area.

Damselfly nymphs have a different food source within the freshwater streams as opposed to on land and in the air, including tadpoles, aquatic invertebrates, small fish and other damselfly nymphs. Although similar to the adult damselfly, the prey is dependent on the individual's size and only consists of smaller species. Xanthocnemis zealandica nymphs are incredibly stealthy when it comes to hunting for prey within the aquatic environment. They tend to hide in the water amongst vegetation and debris, waiting for the perfect opportunity to catch their prey. They use their long narrow extensible labium to capture and grasp onto their prey. Xanthocnemis zealandica nymphs can also be very territorial within the aquatic environment. They often use the same hunting perches for many days, defending their territory with various displays of physical attacks, including striking prey with their jaw and swinging their abdomen to warn off the intruder.

Predators, parasites and diseases

Xanthocnemis zealandica nymphs are often preyed on by various predatory fish, including upland bullies, whereas the adult damselfly is most at risk from birds. Once emerging from the water and transitioning from the nymph stage to the adult stage, the immature damselflies are extremely vulnerable to bird predation, alongside the increased risk of parasitism by mites. In November and December 2001, McKee and colleagues explored the infestation of larval water mites (Arrenurus spp.) found on the body of Xanthocnemis zealandica . The study focused on a single population in Canterbury, targeting both immature and mature adults, although there seemed to be a higher abundance of infestation within the immature adults. The results showed the infestation did not seem to severely impact the mature males from mating, although there was a maximum of 62 mites identified on each infested host, highlighting the abundance of the infestation. Other studies have shown that asymmetry in the wings of Xanthocnemis zealandica could be a result of a poisonous insecticide. By noticing a lack of symmetry in the wings, this could indicate and help determine whether insecticides are a pollutant within the local water source. Although this doesn't cause a major impact to the Xanthocnemis zealandica, it still imposes a threat to the surrounding aquatic environment. Due to climate change, droughts within stream habitats can affect Xanthocnemis zealandica nymphs, although fortunately they have an effective response to the river drying, by burying themselves in damp mud often for several months.

== Other information ==
Xanthocnemis zealandica has the potential to be an excellent example organism for studies targeting evolution. Due to some female Xanthocnemis zealandica having a preference to location of laying eggs in the North Island in comparison to the South Island, these species have the potential to evolve into separate species. Xanthocnemis zealandica found in North Island forested streams have also been recognized as X. sobrina, whereas the redcoat damselfly found in South Island alpine tarns have been recognized as X. sinclairi . Considering that these two potential sister species are living within different conditions, they are likely to evolve distinct traits, relevant to their habitats.

Xanthocnemis zealandica also has incredible awareness and sharp reaction time, due to 80% of its brainpower being devoted specifically towards processing visual images.

X. zealanica has been classified by the Department of Conservation as "Not threatened".

== Gallery ==
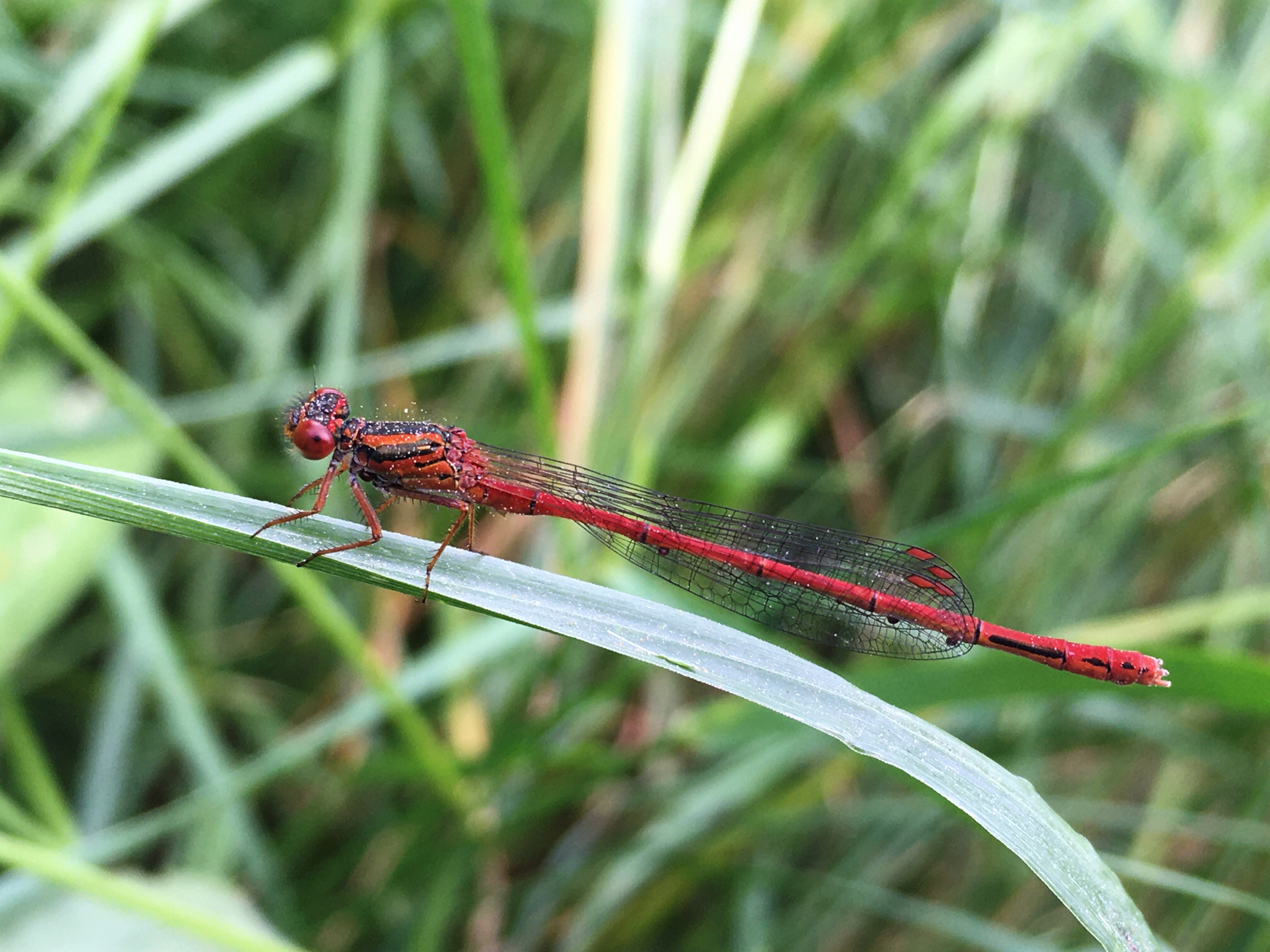
Red damselfly adult male observed in Christchurch, New Zealand

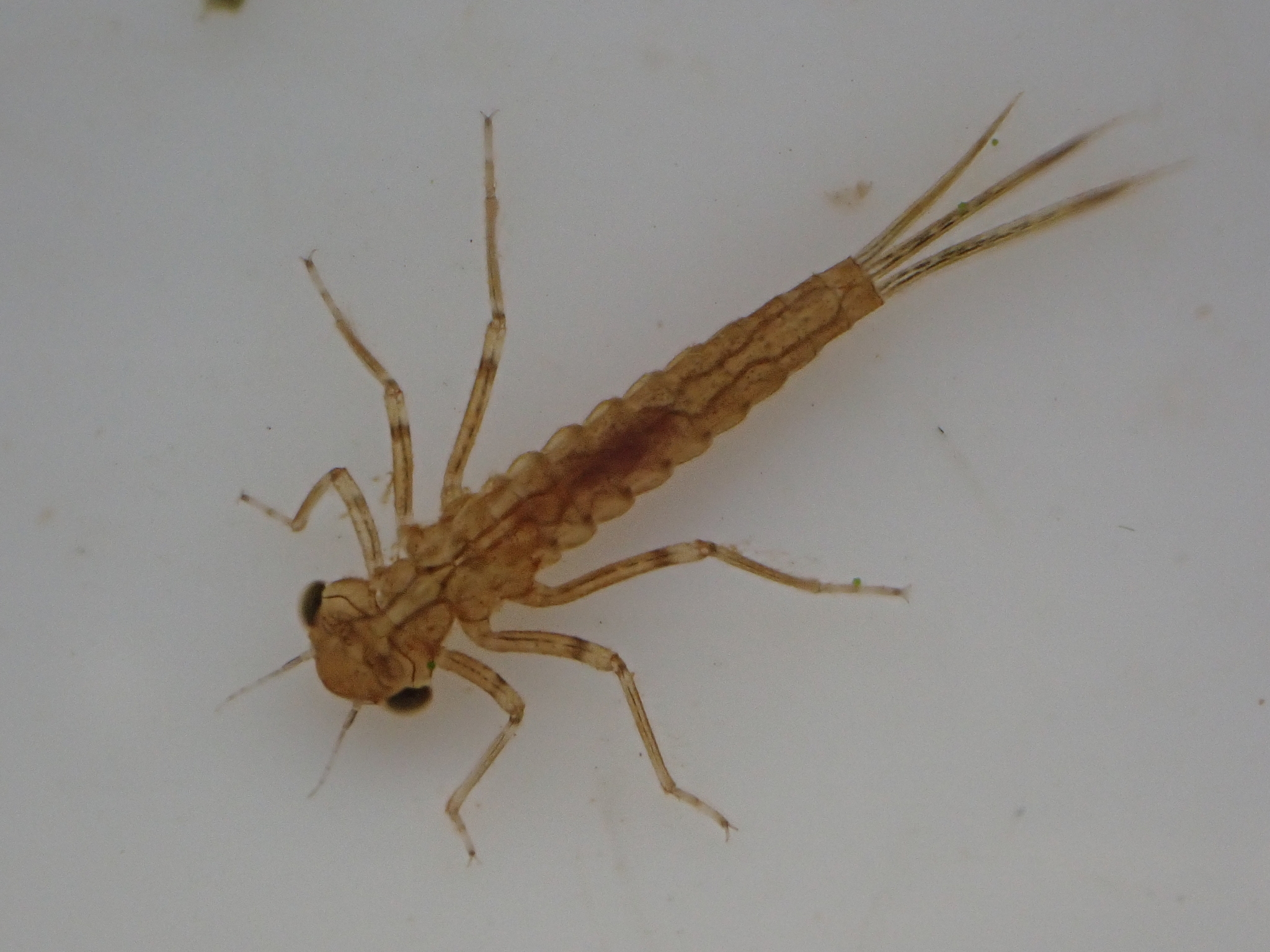
Red damselfly nymph observed on the North Island, New Zealand

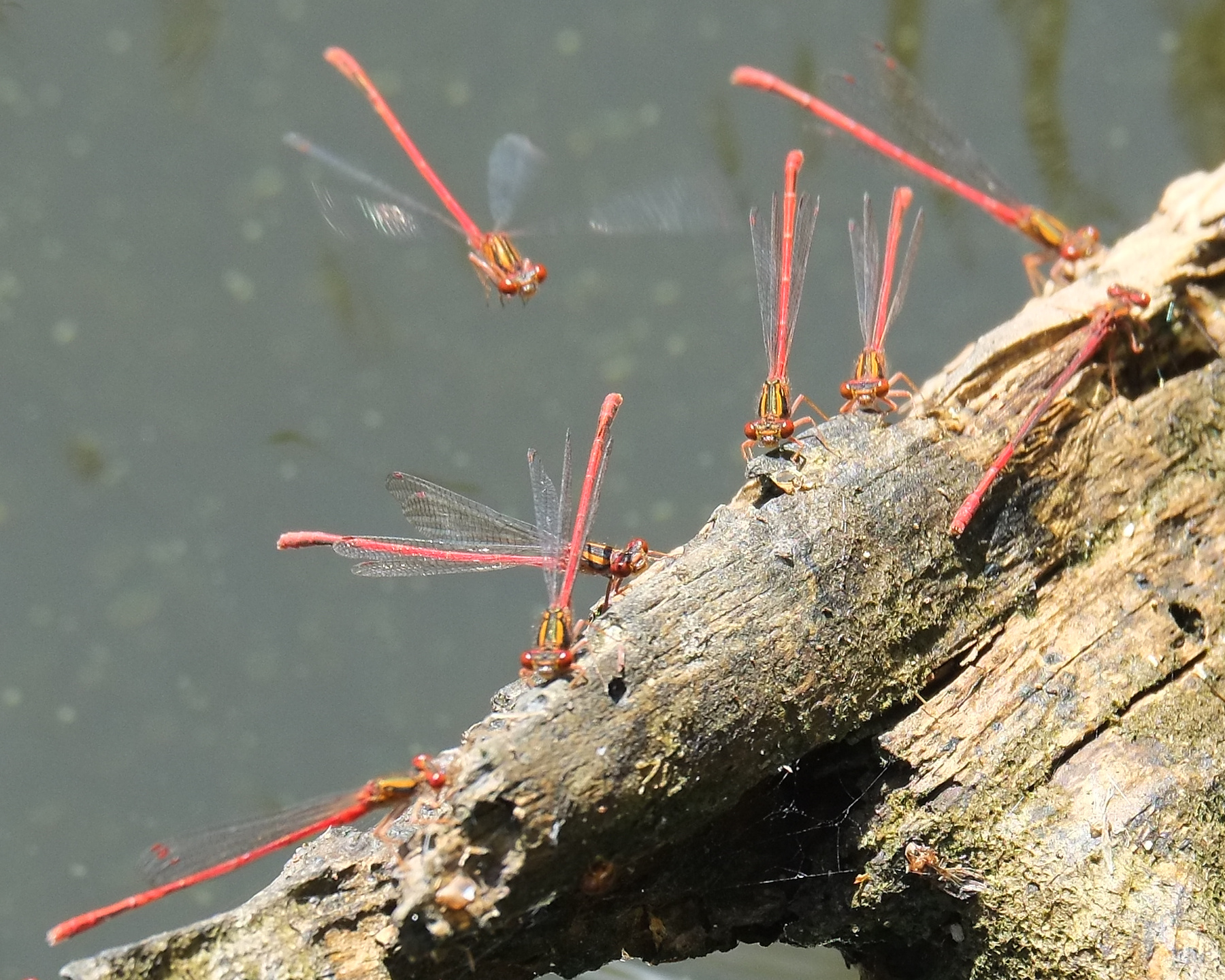
Red damselflies sitting on a log at Zealandia Ecosanctuary, Wellington, New Zealand
