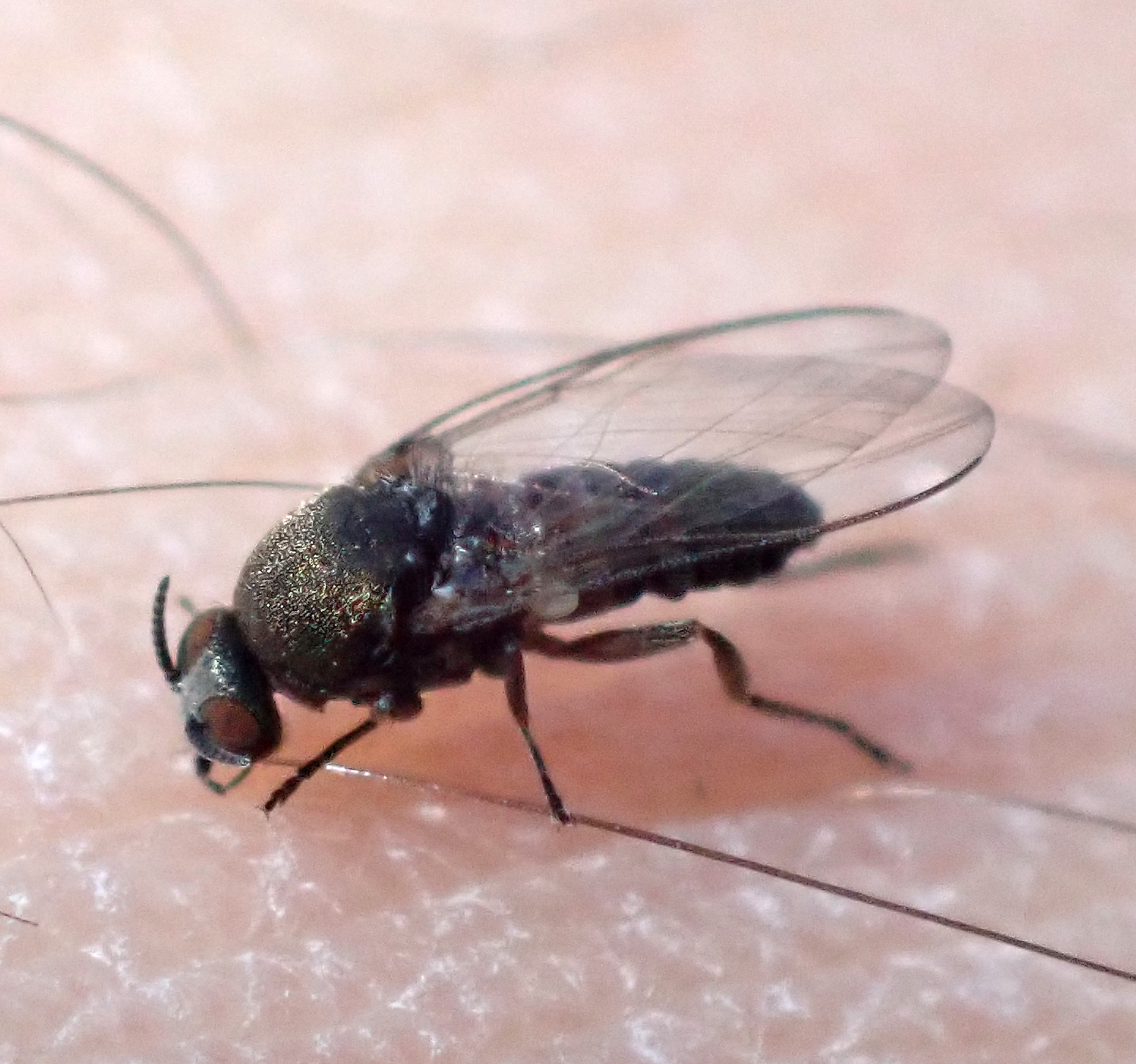
- A. australense

Scientific classification
- Kingdom: Animalia
- Phylum: Arthropoda
- Clade: Pancrustacea
- Class: Insecta
- Order: Diptera
- Family: Simuliidae
- Genus: Austrosimulium
- Subgenus: Austrosimulium; Tonnoir, 1925

= Austrosimulium (subgenus) =

Subgenus of flies

Austrosimulium is a subgenus of Austrosimulium, a genus of Simuliidae (black flies). The flies in this subgenre are found mainly in New Zealand, with a few in Australia. They are the only Simuliidae found in New Zealand.

In New Zealand, where they are known as sandflies, the females of three species – A. australense, A. tillyardianum and A. ungulatum – bite humans; the males do not. A. australense is found in the North Island, South Island, Stewart Island and some offshore islands; it is the sandfly that is encountered most commonly in the North Island and the main one that bites humans there. A. tillyardianum is found in the North Island and the South Island. A. ungulatum is found in the South Island and Stewart Island, and is well-known for biting humans.

== Species ==
These 24 species belong to the subgenus Austrosimulium:

Austrosimulium albovelatum Dumbleton, 1973 (New Zealand (South Island))
Austrosimulium alveolatum Dumbleton, 1973 (New Zealand (South Island))
Austrosimulium australense (Schiner, 1868) (New Zealand, Stewart Island)
Austrosimulium bicorne Dumbleton, 1973 (New Zealand (South Island))
Austrosimulium campbellense Dumbleton, 1973 (Campbell Island)
Austrosimulium cornutum Tonnoir, 1925 (Australia (Victoria, NSW, Tasmania))
Austrosimulium crassipes Tonnoir, 1925 (Australia (Victoria, NSW, Queensland))
Austrosimulium dugdalei Craig, Craig & Crosby, 2012 (New Zealand (North Island))
Austrosimulium dumbletoni Crosby, 1976 (New Zealand (South Island))
Austrosimulium extendorum Craig, Craig & Crosby, 2012 (New Zealand (Stewart Island))
Austrosimulium fiordense Dumbleton, 1973 (New Zealand (South Island))
Austrosimulium fulvicorne Mackerras & Mackerras, 1950 (Australia (Queensland))
Austrosimulium laticorne Tonnoir, 1925 (New Zealand (South Island))
Austrosimulium longicorne Tonnoir, 1925 (New Zealand)
Austrosimulium mirabile Mackerras & Mackerras, 1948 (Australia (Queensland))
Austrosimulium montanum Mackerras & Mackerras, 1952 (Australia (NSW, Victoria))
Austrosimulium multicorne Tonnoir, 1925 (New Zealand (South Island))
Austrosimulium stewartense Dumbleton, 1973 (New Zealand (Stewart Island, South Island))
Austrosimulium tillyardianum Dumbleton, 1973 (New Zealand)
Austrosimulium tonnoiri Craig, Craig & Crosby, 2012 (New Zealand (South Island))
Austrosimulium ungulatum Tonnoir, 1925 (New Zealand (South Island, Stewart Island))
Austrosimulium unicorne Dumbleton, 1973 (New Zealand (South Island))
Austrosimulium vailavoense Craig, Craig & Crosby, 2012 (New Zealand (Stewart Island, South Island))
Austrosimulium vexans (Mik, 1881) (Auckland Islands)
