= Cnephia =

Scientific classification
- Kingdom: Animalia
- Phylum: Arthropoda
- Class: Insecta
- Order: Diptera
- Family: Simuliidae
- Tribe: Simuliini
- Genus: Cnephia; Enderlein, 1921

Type species
- C. pecuarum Riley, 1887

Species
- See Text

Synonyms
- Astega Enderlein, 1930

Genus of flies

Cnephia is a genus of 9 species of black flies. They are distributed in scattered locations across the Northern Hemisphere, from Ukraine to Eastern Siberia, and some parts of North America.

== Species ==
- C. angarensis Rubtsov, 1956
- C. chaurensis Yankovsky, 2000
- C. dacotensis (Dyar & Shannon, 1927)
- C. eremites Shewell, 1952
- C. intermedia Rubtsov, 1956
- C. ornithophilia Davies, Peterson & Wood, 1962
- C. pallipes (Fries, 1824)
- C. pecuarum (Riley, 1887)
- C. toptchievi Yankovsky, 1996
