= Parasimuliinae =

Scientific classification
- Kingdom: Animalia
- Phylum: Arthropoda
- Clade: Pancrustacea
- Class: Insecta
- Order: Diptera
- Family: Simuliidae
- Subfamily: Parasimuliinae; Smart, 1945

Type genus
- Parasimulium Malloch, 1914

Subfamily of insects

Parasimuliinae is a subfamily of Simuliidae (black flies) containing only one genus and four species. Most species are rare, and some are cave dwellers, in western North America.

== Species ==
- Genus Parasimulium Malloch, 1914

- Subgenus Astoneomyia Peterson, 1977

- P. melanderi Stone, 1963

- Subgenus Parasimulium Malloch, 1914

- P. crosskeyi Peterson, 1977
- P. furcatum Malloch, 1914
- P. stonei Peterson, 1977
