= Charimachilis caucasicus =

Scientific classification
- Kingdom: Animalia
- Phylum: Arthropoda
- Clade: Pancrustacea
- Class: Insecta
- Order: Archaeognatha
- Family: Machilidae
- Genus: Charimachilis
- Species: C. caucasicus

Binomial name
- Charimachilis caucasicus Kaplin, 1999

Species of archaeognatha

Charimachilis caucasicus is a species in the genus Charimachilis of the family Machilidae which belongs to the insect order Archaeognatha (jumping bristletails).
