= Araucnephioides =

Scientific classification
- Kingdom: Animalia
- Phylum: Arthropoda
- Class: Insecta
- Order: Diptera
- Family: Simuliidae
- Tribe: Simuliini
- Genus: Araucnephioides; Wygodzinsky & Coscarón, 1973

Type species
- A. schlingeri Wygodzinsky & Coscarón, 1973

Species
- 1, See Text

Genus of flies

Araucnephioides is a genus of black flies from Chile. There is only one known species.

== Species ==
- A. schlingeri Wygodzinsky & Coscarón, 1973
