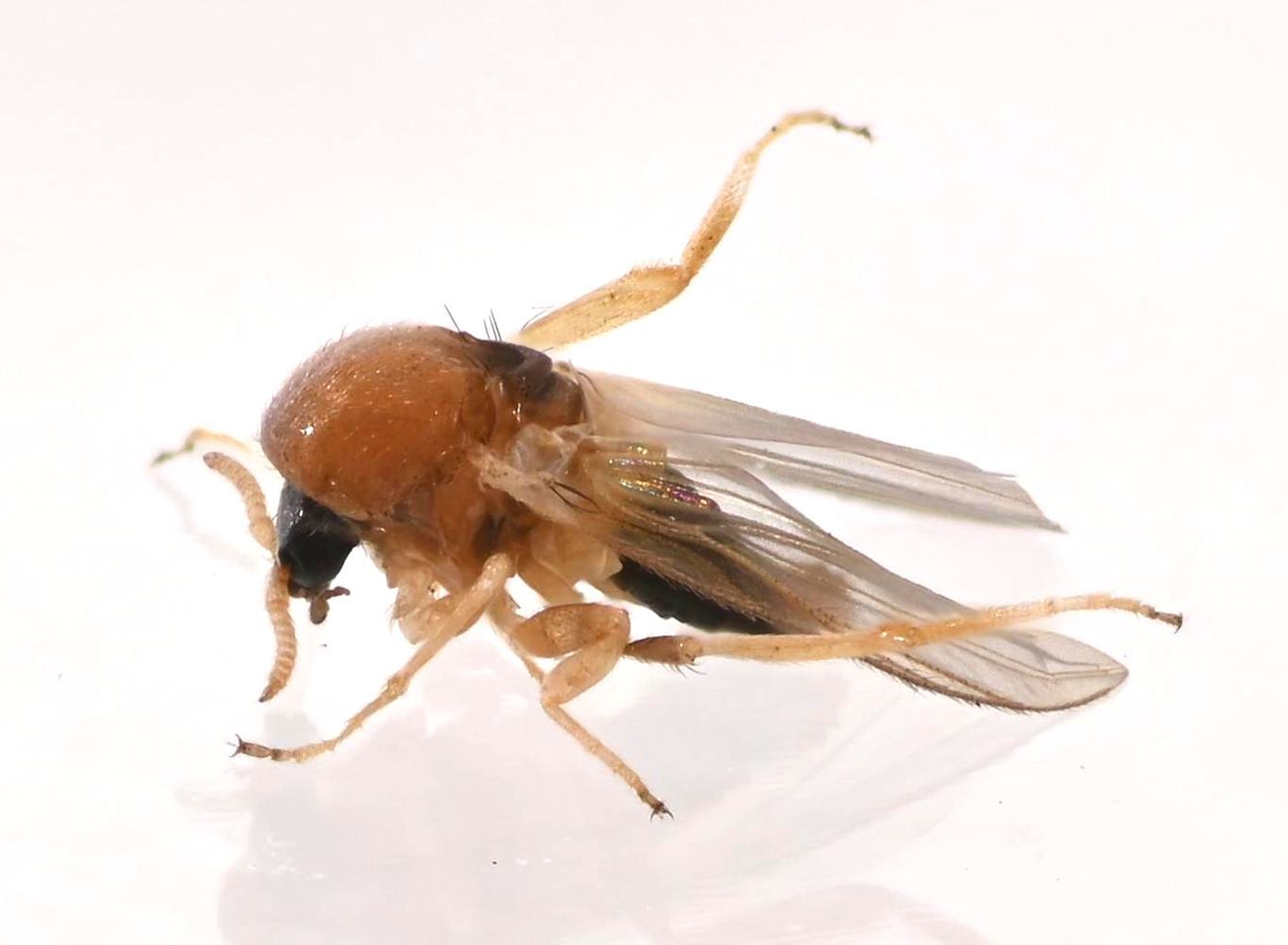

Scientific classification
- Kingdom: Animalia
- Phylum: Arthropoda
- Class: Insecta
- Order: Diptera
- Family: Simuliidae
- Subfamily: Parasimuliinae
- Genus: Parasimulium; Malloch, 1914

Type species
- P. furcatum Malloch, 1914

Species
- See text

= Parasimulium =

Genus of flies

Parasimulium is a genus of black flies containing two subgenera and four species. They are found in western North America. Most species are rare, and some Canadian species are cave dwellers.

== Species ==
- Subgenus Astoneomyia Peterson, 1977

- P. melanderi Stone, 1963

- Subgenus Parasimulium Malloch, 1914

- P. crosskeyi Peterson, 1977
- P. furcatum Malloch, 1914
- P. stonei Peterson, 1977
