= Charimachilis dentata =

Scientific classification
- Kingdom: Animalia
- Phylum: Arthropoda
- Clade: Pancrustacea
- Class: Insecta
- Order: Archaeognatha
- Family: Machilidae
- Genus: Charimachilis
- Species: C. dentata

Binomial name
- Charimachilis dentata Wygodzinsky, 1941

Species of jumping bristletail

Charimachilis dentata is a species of jumping bristletail in the family Machilidae.
