= Charimachilis manfredoniae =

Scientific classification
- Kingdom: Animalia
- Phylum: Arthropoda
- Clade: Pancrustacea
- Class: Insecta
- Order: Archaeognatha
- Family: Machilidae
- Genus: Charimachilis
- Species: C. manfredoniae

Binomial name
- Charimachilis manfredoniae Kaplin 2010

Species of archaeognatha

Charimachilis manfredoniae is a species in the genus Charimachilis of the family Machilidae which belongs to the insect order Archaeognatha (jumping bristletails).
