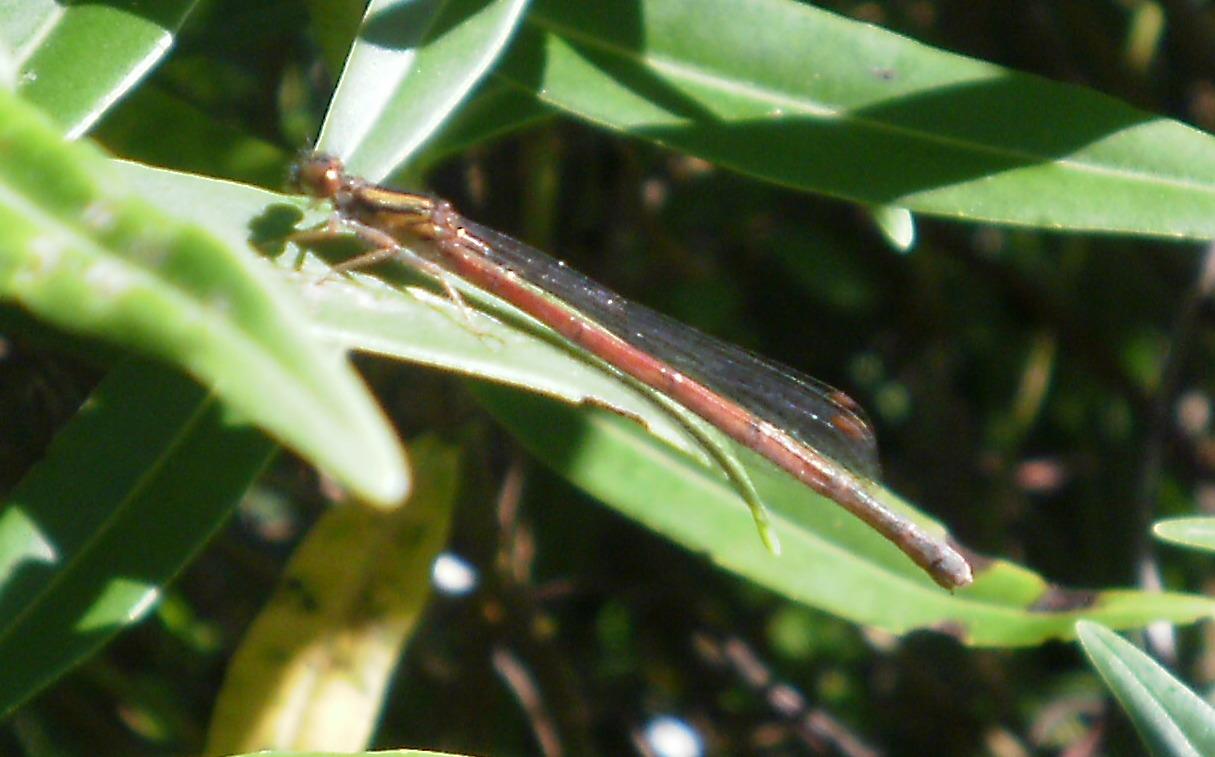
- Xanthocnemis zealandica, common redcoat damselfly

Scientific classification
- Kingdom: Animalia
- Phylum: Arthropoda
- Clade: Pancrustacea
- Class: Insecta
- Order: Odonata
- Suborder: Zygoptera
- Family: Coenagrionidae
- Genus: Xanthocnemis; Tillyard, 1913

= Xanthocnemis =

Genus of damselflies

Xanthocnemis is a genus of narrow-winged damselflies in the family Coenagrionidae. There are two species in Xanthocnemis, both found in New Zealand.

== Species ==
These two species belong to the genus Xanthocnemis:

- Xanthocnemis tuanuii Rowe, 1981 (Chatham redcoat damselfly)
- Xanthocnemis zealandica (McLachlan, 1873) (common redcoat damselfy)
