= Charimachilis relicta =

Scientific classification
- Kingdom: Animalia
- Phylum: Arthropoda
- Clade: Pancrustacea
- Class: Insecta
- Order: Archaeognatha
- Family: Machilidae
- Genus: Charimachilis
- Species: C. relicta

Binomial name
- Charimachilis relicta Janetschek, 1954

Species of jumping bristletail

Charimachilis relicta is a species of jumping bristletail in the family Machilidae.

== Subspecies ==
These five subspecies belong to the species Charimachilis relicta:

- Charimachilis relicta egatensis Bach, 1982
- Charimachilis relicta insularis Janetschek, 1957
- Charimachilis relicta melitensis Stach, 1958
- Charimachilis relicta meridionalis Janetschek, 1957
- Charimachilis relicta relicta Janetschek, 1954
