= Stegopterna =

Scientific classification
- Kingdom: Animalia
- Phylum: Arthropoda
- Clade: Pancrustacea
- Class: Insecta
- Order: Diptera
- Family: Simuliidae
- Tribe: Simuliini
- Genus: Stegopterna; Enderlein, 1930

Genus of flies

Stegopterna is a genus of black flies (insects in the family Simuliidae). There are about 15 described species in Stegopterna.

== Species ==
These 15 species belong to the genus Stegopterna:

- Stegopterna acra Currie, Adler & Wood, 2004^{c g}
- Stegopterna byrrangii Yankovsky, 2000^{c g}
- Stegopterna decafilis Rubtsov, 1971^{c g}
- Stegopterna diplomutata Currie & Hunter, 2003^{c g}
- Stegopterna duodecimata (Rubtsov, 1940)^{c g}
- Stegopterna emergens (Stone, 1952)^{i c g}
- Stegopterna freyi (Enderlein, 1929)^{c g}
- Stegopterna hamuligera Yankovsky, 1977^{c g}
- Stegopterna mutata (Malloch, 1914)^{i c g b} (mutated black fly)
- Stegopterna nukabirana Ono, 1977^{c g}
- Stegopterna permutata (Dyar & Shannon, 1927)^{c g}
- Stegopterna poljakovae Patrusheva, 1977^{c g}
- Stegopterna takeshii Takaoka, 2005^{c g}
- Stegopterna tschukotensis Rubtsov, 1971^{c g}
- Stegopterna xantha Currie, Adler & Wood, 2004^{c g}

Data sources: i = ITIS, c = Catalogue of Life, g = GBIF, b = Bugguide.net
