= Charimachilis armata =

Scientific classification
- Kingdom: Animalia
- Phylum: Arthropoda
- Clade: Pancrustacea
- Class: Insecta
- Order: Archaeognatha
- Family: Machilidae
- Genus: Charimachilis
- Species: C. armata

Binomial name
- Charimachilis armata Stach, 1958

Species of jumping bristletail

Charimachilis armata is a species of jumping bristletail in the family Machilidae.
