= Ectemnia =

Scientific classification
- Kingdom: Animalia
- Phylum: Arthropoda
- Clade: Pancrustacea
- Class: Insecta
- Order: Diptera
- Family: Simuliidae
- Tribe: Simuliini
- Genus: Ectemnia; Enderlein, 1930

Type species
- Cnesia taeniatifrons Enderlein, 1925

Species
- See Text

Genus of flies

Ectemnia is a genus of 4 species of black flies. They are distributed in North America.

== Species ==
- E. invenusta (Walker, 1848)
- E. primaeva Moulton & Adler, 1997
- E. reclusa Moulton & Adler, 1997
- E. taeniatifrons (Enderlein, 1925)
