= Charimachilis orientalis =

Scientific classification
- Kingdom: Animalia
- Phylum: Arthropoda
- Clade: Pancrustacea
- Class: Insecta
- Order: Archaeognatha
- Family: Machilidae
- Genus: Charimachilis
- Species: C. orientalis

Binomial name
- Charimachilis orientalis (Silvestri, 1908)

Species of jumping bristletail

Charimachilis orientalis is a species of jumping bristletail in the family Machilidae.
