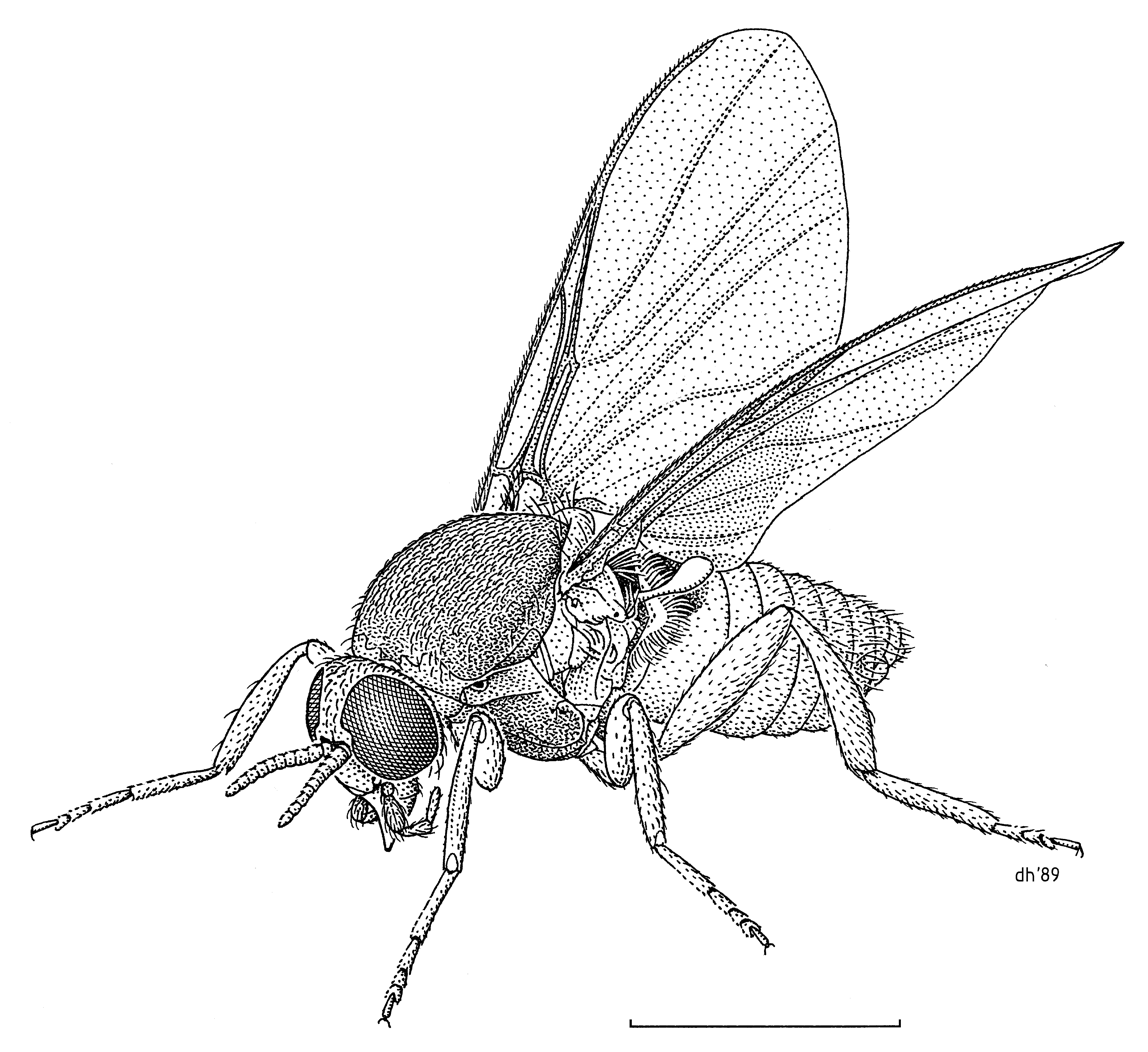
- Illustration by Des Helmore

Scientific classification
- Kingdom: Animalia
- Phylum: Arthropoda
- Clade: Pancrustacea
- Class: Insecta
- Order: Diptera
- Family: Simuliidae
- Genus: Austrosimulium
- Subgenus: Austrosimulium
- Species: A. australense

Binomial name
- Austrosimulium australense ( Schiner, 1868)

Synonyms
- Simulia australensis; Simulium tillyardi Tonnoir, 1923

= Austrosimulium australense =

Species of fly

Austrosimulium australense, known as the New Zealand black fly or more commonly sandfly (namu in Māori), is a species of small fly of the family Simuliidae, endemic to New Zealand. Females consume blood for nutrients to produce eggs, and it is one of three species of Austrosimulium in New Zealand that often bite humans.

== Description ==
The bodies of adult females are 2.0–2.4 mm long; their wings are 1.9–2.5 mm long and 0.9–1.2 mm wide. The bodies of males are 1.8–2.8 mm long; their wings are 1.7–2.1 mm long and 0.8–1.1 mm wide.

Larvae and pupae of the insect are found in small, cold-water streams, usually under heavy forest shade that serves to keep the water cool.

Larva and pupa

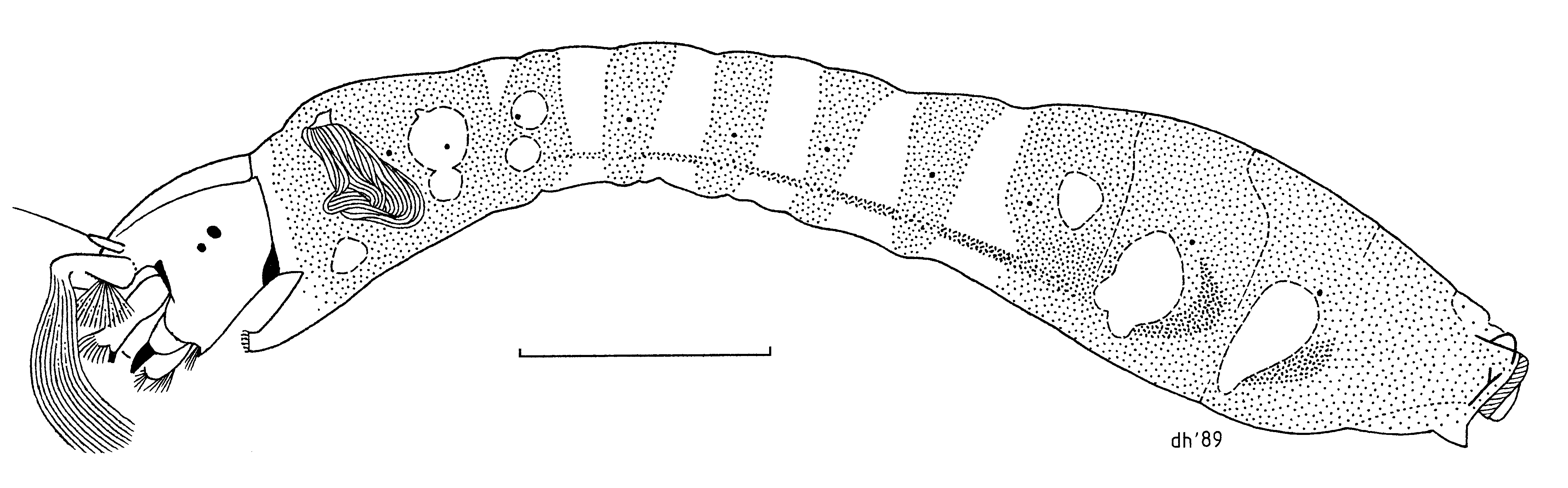
Larva

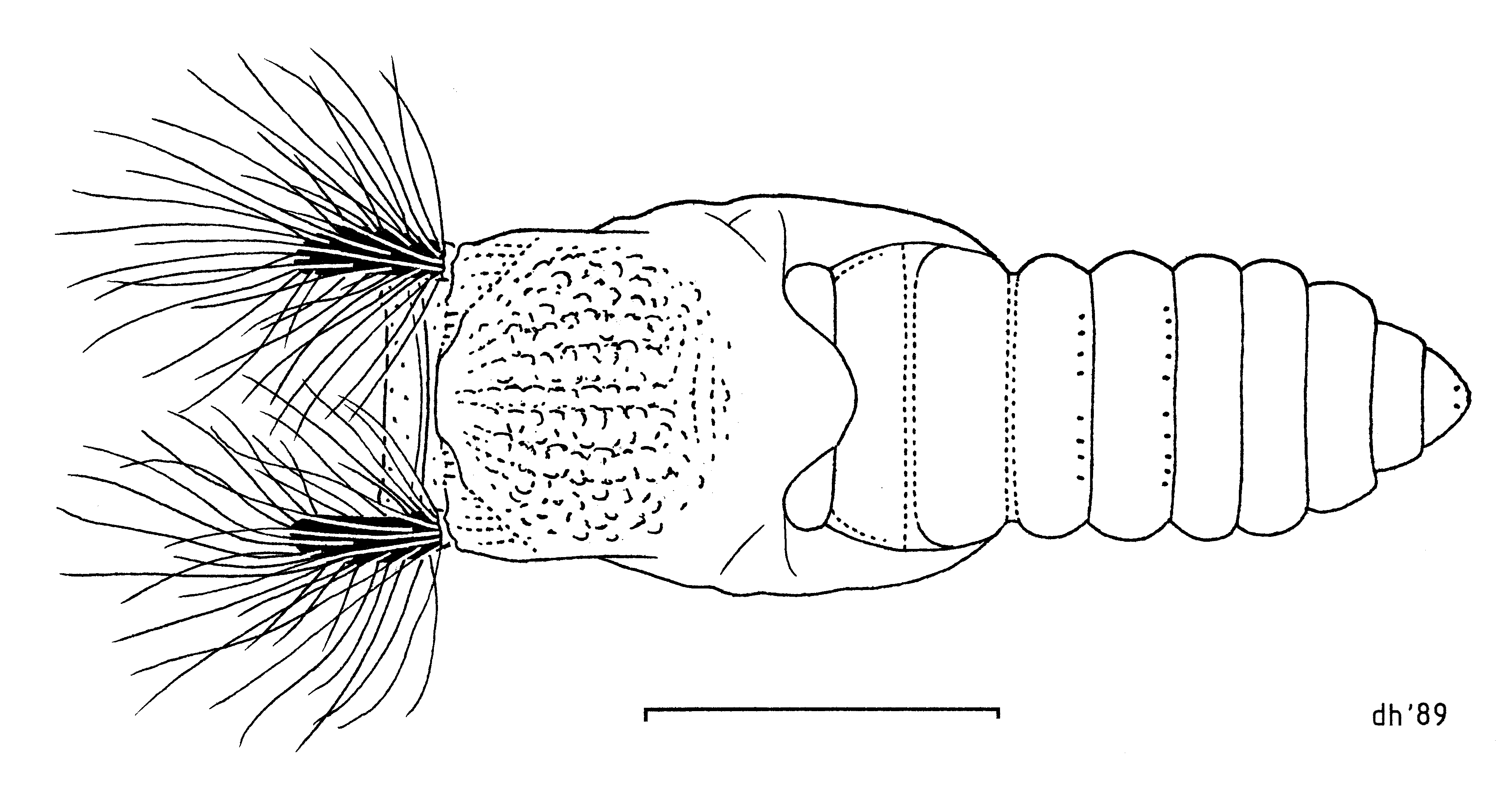
Pupa

== Distribution ==
This is the most widely distributed species of Austrosimulium in New Zealand, being found from North Cape to Stewart Island, although it is largely absent from Canterbury, Otago, and the South Island high country.

== Feeding ==
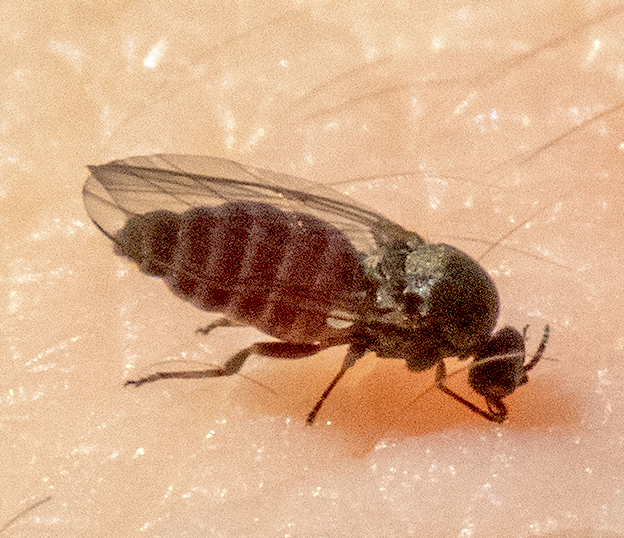
Female A. australense feeding on human blood

Most species of Austrosimulium in New Zealand do not attack humans; A. australense is one of the three which does.

...no sooner had the sun risen, and we issued from our tent to wash by the river side, than those peculiarly vexatious pests, the sand-flies (namu), commenced their attacks on our bare hands and feet. The sand-fly is a small black insect, and swarms in such myriads, that one is never free from their vengeance, if remaining for a single instant in the same position: whilst sketching, my hands are frequently covered with blood, and their numbers being inexhaustible, one at last gets weary of killing them.…The horrid sand-flies attacked us to-day more unmercifully than ever, and in such clouds that I should imagine them to be a species very nearly allied to those that constituted the fourth plague of Egypt.
—account of A. australense near the Waikato River, 29 September 1844
