= Greniera =

Scientific classification
- Kingdom: Animalia
- Phylum: Arthropoda
- Clade: Pancrustacea
- Class: Insecta
- Order: Diptera
- Family: Simuliidae
- Tribe: Simuliini
- Genus: Greniera; Doby & David, 1959

Genus of insects

Greniera is a genus of flies belonging to the family Simuliidae.

The species of this genus are found in Europe and Northern America.

Species:

- Greniera abdita (Peterson, 1962)
- Greniera abditoides (Wood, 1963)
