= Prosimuliini =

Scientific classification
- Kingdom: Animalia
- Phylum: Arthropoda
- Class: Insecta
- Order: Diptera
- Family: Simuliidae
- Subfamily: Simuliinae
- Tribe: Prosimuliini; Latreille, 1802

Type genus
- Prosimulium Roubaud, 1906

Genera
- See text

Synonyms
- Hellichiini Enderlein, 1925; Gymnopaidinae Rubtsov, 1955; Helodoini Ono, 1982; Kovalevimyiinae Kalugina, 1991

Tribe of flies

Prosimuliini is a tribe of black flies. It contains over 140 living species, with more than a half of them in the genus Prosimulium. There are 6 living genera, and 2 genera that are only known from Cretaceous fossils.

== Living genera ==
- Gymnopais Stone, 1949
- Helodon Enderlein, 1921
  - Subgenus Distosimulium Peterson, 1970
  - Subgenus Helodon Enderlein, 1921
  - Subgenus Parahelodon Peterson, 1970
- Levitinia Chubareva & Petrova, 1981
- Prosimulium Roubaud, 1906
- Twinnia Stone & Jamnback, 1955
- Urosimulium Contini, 1963

== Fossil genera ==
- Kovalevimyia Kalugina, 1991
- Simulimima Kalugina, 1985
