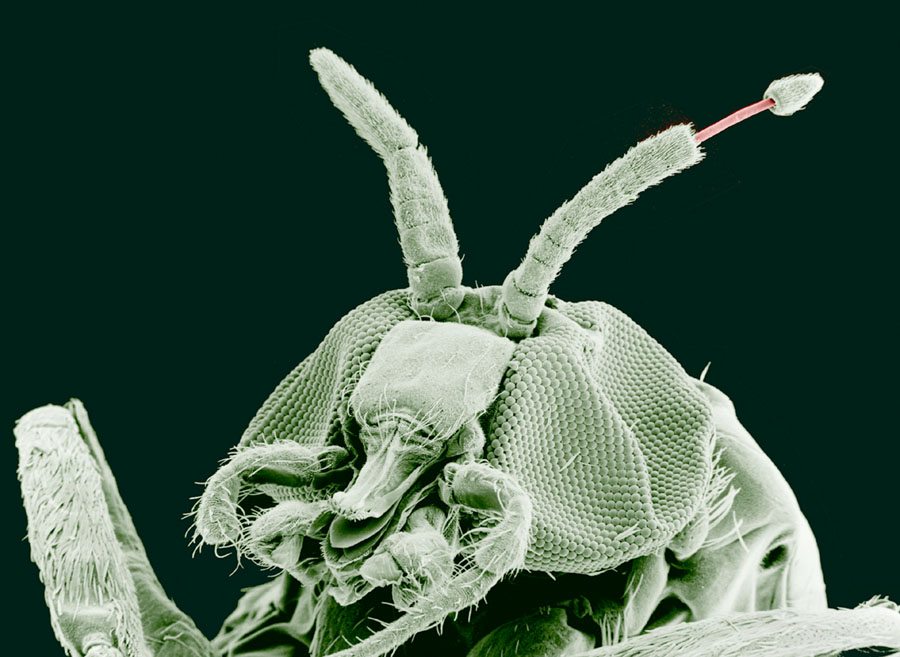
- S. yahense

Scientific classification
- Domain: Eukaryota
- Kingdom: Animalia
- Phylum: Arthropoda
- Class: Insecta
- Order: Diptera
- Family: Simuliidae
- Subfamily: Simuliinae; Newman, 1834

Tribes
- Prosimuliini Enderlein, 1921; Simuliini Latreille, 1802

= Simuliinae =

Subfamily of flies

Simuliinae is a subfamily of black flies (Simuliidae). It contains over 2,200 species, with over 1,800 of them in the genus Simulium. There are 2 tribes and 25 living genera. A further 5 genera are known only from Cretaceous fossils.
