= Cnesia =

Scientific classification
- Kingdom: Animalia
- Phylum: Arthropoda
- Clade: Pancrustacea
- Class: Insecta
- Order: Diptera
- Family: Simuliidae
- Tribe: Simuliini
- Genus: Cnesia; Enderlein, 1934

Type species
- C. gynandrum (Edwards, 1931)

Species
- See Text

Genus of flies

Cnesia is a genus of 4 species of black flies. They are distributed in Argentina and Chile.

== Species ==
- C. dissimilis (Edwards, 1931)
- C. gynandrum (Edwards, 1931)
- C. ornata Wygodzinsky & Coscarón, 1973
- C. pusilla Wygodzinsky & Coscarón, 1973
