= Prosimulium =

Scientific classification
- Kingdom: Animalia
- Phylum: Arthropoda
- Class: Insecta
- Order: Diptera
- Family: Simuliidae
- Tribe: Prosimuliini
- Genus: Prosimulium; Roubaud, 1906

Genus of flies

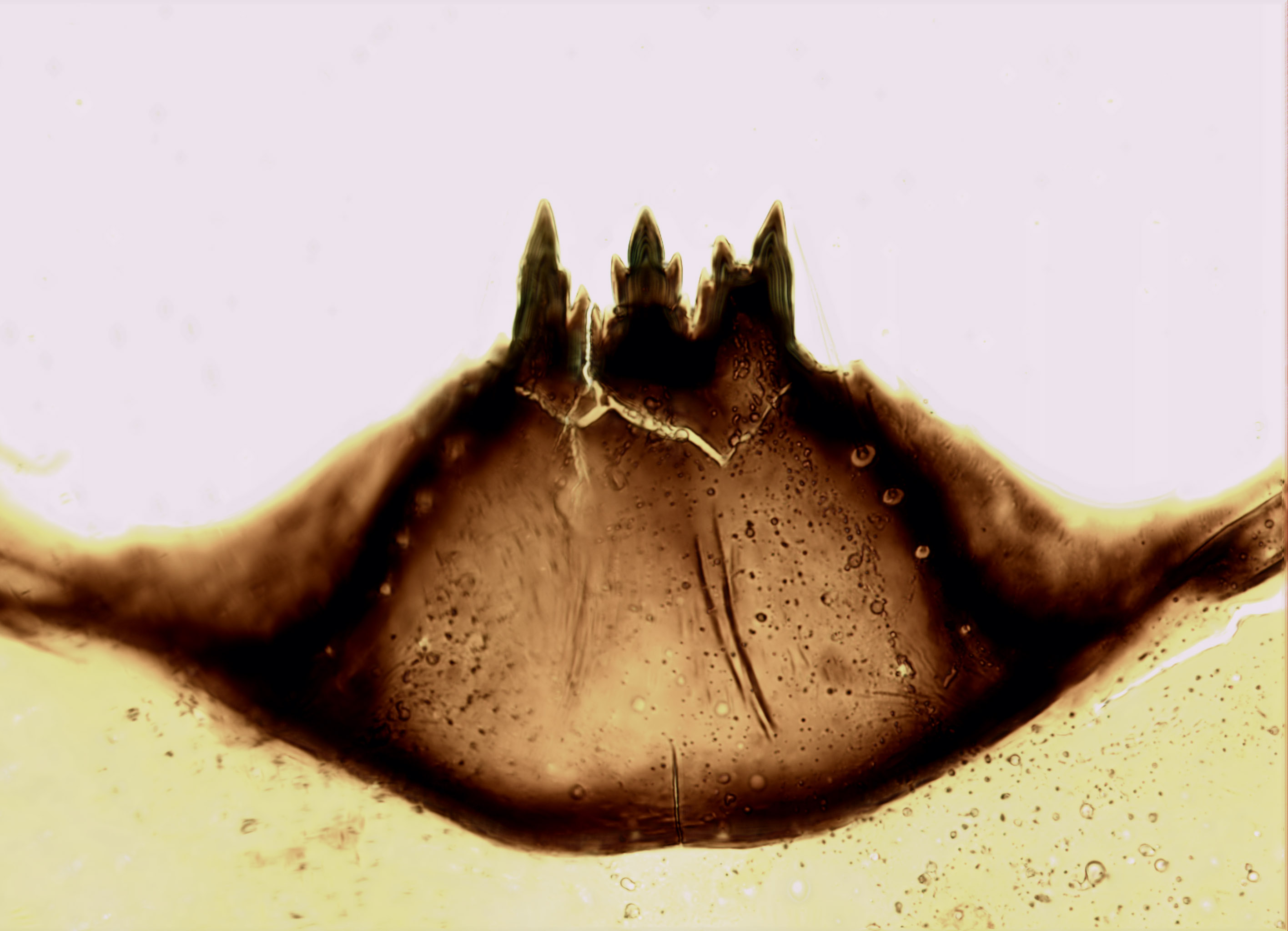
Mouth part of a blackfly larva of Prosimulium sp., 400x

Prosimulium is a genus of black flies (insects in the family Simuliidae). There are at least 110 described species in Prosimulium.

== See also ==
- List of Prosimulium species
