= Petr Wolfgang Wygodzinsky =

German entomologist

Petr (Pedro or Peter) Wolfgang Wygodzinsky (5 October 1916 – 27 January 1987) was a German entomologist who worked in Argentina, Brazil, and the United States.

Wygodzinsky was born in Bonn, Germany on 5 October 1916 and educated at the University of Basel, Switzerland where he received his doctorate in 1941 under the direction of Eduard Handschin. His dissertation was a detailed study of the Diplura, Thysanura, and Microcoryphia of Switzerland. That same year he emigrated to Brazil where he intended to work as a bicycle mechanic. However, through contacts he met while sailing to Brazil he was able find work as a taxonomist for the National Malarial Service and later, the Ministry of Agriculture in Rio de Janeiro. He spent seven years in Brazil where he made the acquaintance of Brazilian entomologists Herman Lent and Hugo de Souza Lopes.

In 1948 he moved to Tucuman, Argentina where he became a professor of entomology and genetics at the National University of Tucumán. He also served as a specialist on the taxonomy of black flies (Simuliidae) at the university's Institute of Tropical Medicine. He later worked for the Instituto Miguel Lillo and in 1958 he joined the faculty at the University of Buenos Aires as a professor of entomology.

Wygodzinsky was well-known and respected for his entomological work in South America. In 1955 and again in 1960 he was awarded Guggenheim Fellowships to study at the University California, Berkeley, with his good friend Robert L. Usinger. While at Berkeley he also met Jerome Rozen who was impressed with Wygodzinsky's abilities. Rozen later became chairman of the Entomology Department at the American Museum in New York and hired Wygodzinsky in 1962.

Wygodzinsky remained at the American Museum for the rest of his career. In the late 1970s he was diagnosed with Parkinson's disease. He worked for several more years and died on 27 January 1987 in Middletown, New York.

He is especially known for his work on the hemipteran family Reduviidae, but also studied several other groups of insects in detail, namely Diplura, Archaeognatha, Zygentoma and Diptera.

Wygodzinsky published more than 250 papers. He was fluent in several languages, and wrote his papers in his native language German as well as in English, Spanish and Portuguese.
