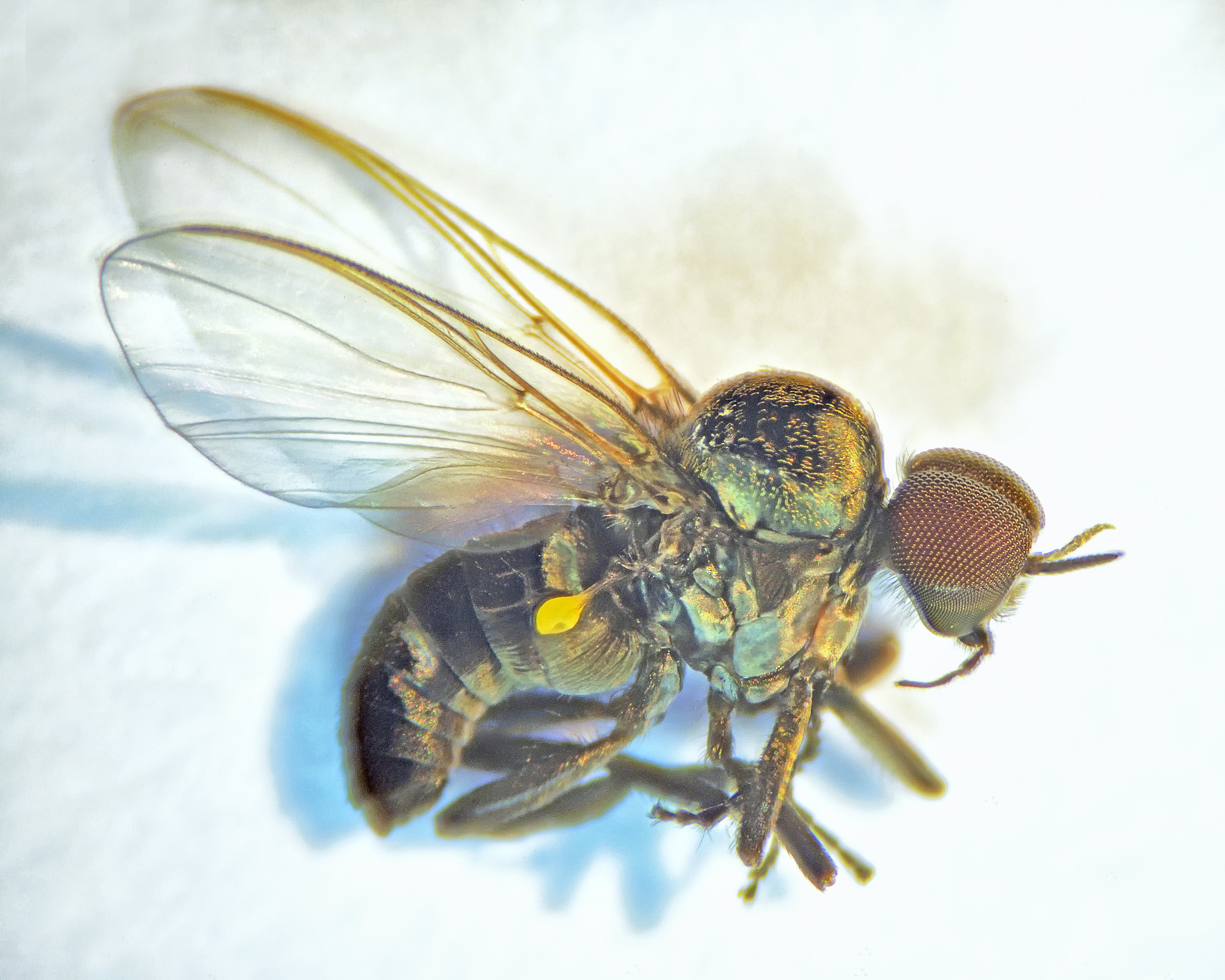
- Simulium trifasciatum

Scientific classification
- Kingdom: Animalia
- Phylum: Arthropoda
- Clade: Pancrustacea
- Class: Insecta
- Order: Diptera
- Superfamily: Chironomoidea
- Family: Simuliidae; Newman, 1834

Subfamilies
- Parasimuliinae; Simuliinae; Genera: Araucnephia; Araucnephioides; Archicnephia; Austrosimulium; Baisomyia; Cnephia; Cnesia; Cnesiamima; Crozetia; Ectemnia; Gigantodax; Greniera; Gydarina; Gymnopais; Kovalevimyia; Levitinia; Lutzsimulium; Mayacnephia; Metacnephia; Paracnephia; Parasimulium; Paraustrosimulium; Pedrowygomyia; Prosimulium; Simuliites; Simulimima; Simulium; Stegopterna; Sulcicnephia; Titanopteryx; Tlalocomyia; Twinnia; Data related to Black fly at Wikispecies

= Black fly =

Black fly Temporal range: Norian–Recent

Family of insects

Black flies or blackflies (sometimes called buffalo gnats, turkey gnats, or white socks) are flies in the family Simuliidae of the Culicomorpha infraorder. Simuliidae are related to the Ceratopogonidae, Chironomidae, and Thaumaleidae. Over 2,200 species of black flies have been formally named, of which 15 are extinct. They are divided into two subfamilies: Parasimuliinae contains only one genus and four species; Simuliinae contains all the rest. Over 1,800 of the species belong to the genus Simulium.

Black flies are usually small, black or gray, with short legs and antennae. They feed mainly on nectar for flight energy, and the females of most species also gain nourishment for egg production by feeding on the blood of birds or mammals, including humans. They are a common nuisance for humans, and many U.S. states have programs to suppress the black fly population. They spread several diseases, including river blindness in Africa (Simulium damnosum and S. neavei) and the Americas (S. callidum and S. metallicum in Central America, S. ochraceum in Central and South America).

== Ecology ==
Eggs are laid in running water, and the larvae attach themselves to submerged rocks. Breeding success is highly sensitive to water pollution. The larvae use tiny hooks at the ends of their abdomens to hold on to the substrate, using silk holdfasts and threads to move or hold their place. They have foldable fans surrounding their mouths, also termed "mouth brushes". The fans expand when feeding, catching passing debris (small organic particles, algae, and bacteria). The larva scrapes the fan's catch into its mouth every few seconds. Black flies depend on lotic (flowing water) habitats to bring food to them. They will pupate under water and then emerge in a bubble of air as flying adults. They are often preyed upon by trout during emergence. The larva of some South African species are known to be phoretic on mayfly nymphs.

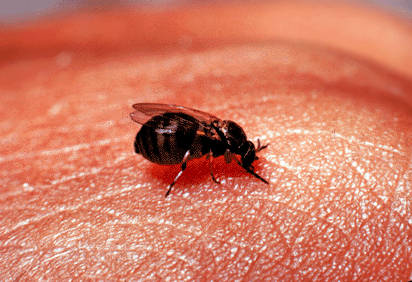
A female black fly

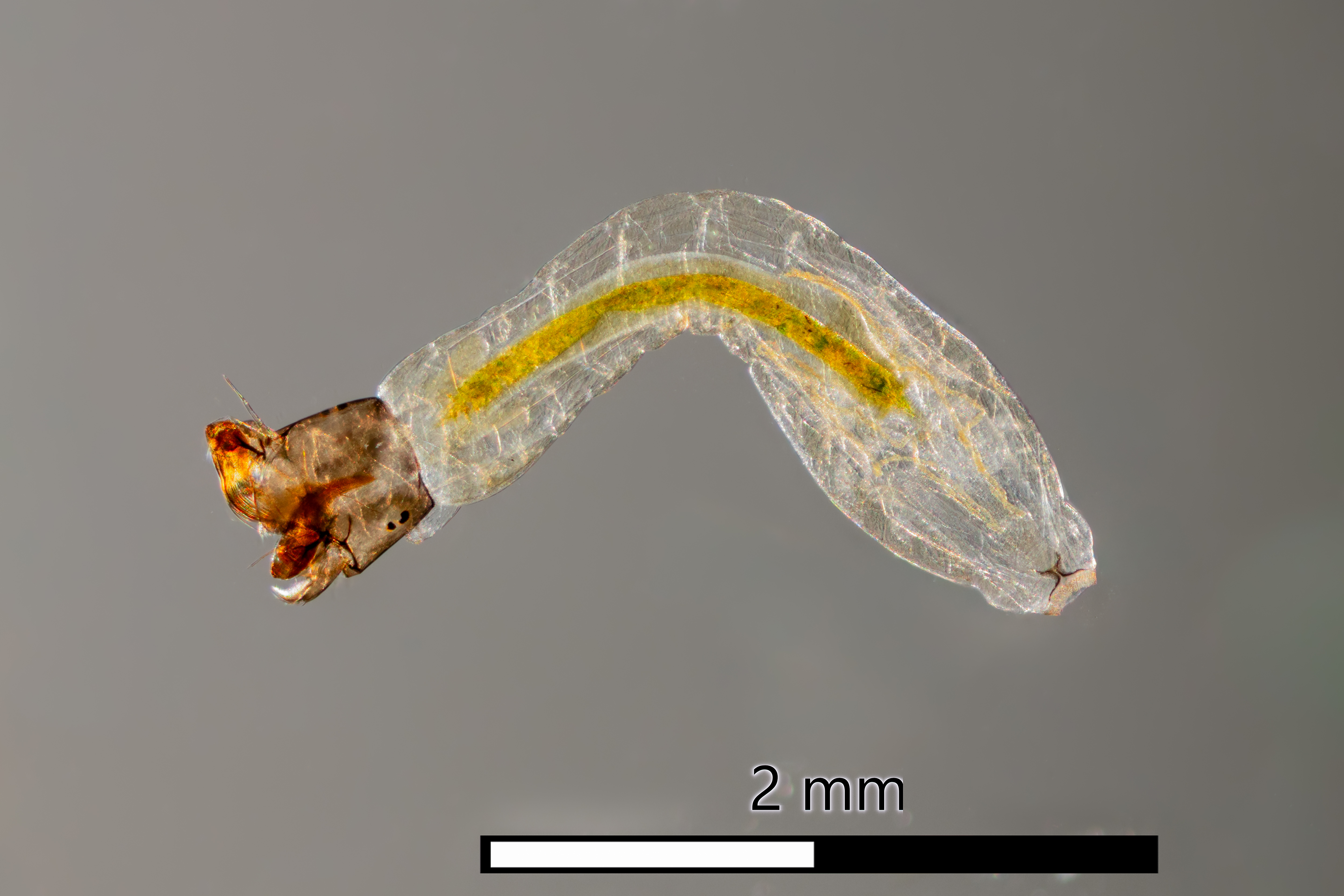
Black fly larva

Adult males and females feed on water and a source of carbohydrate, such as nectar or honeydew, for energy for flight. Females of most species also exhibit anautogeny and bite birds or mammals to feed on blood for nutrients to produce eggs; the mouths of males are not able to bite through skin. Different species prefer different hosts for their blood meals, which is sometimes reflected in the common name for the species. They feed in the daytime, preferably when wind speeds are low. Some species in Africa can range as far as 40 mi (64 km) from aquatic breeding sites in search of their blood meals, while other species have more limited ranges. In the small percentage of species that do not bite, the females produce eggs using nutrients they have retained from the larval stage. Male black flies are rarely seen.

Black flies may be either univoltine or multivoltine, depending on the species. The number of generations a particular pest species has each year tends to correlate with the intensity of human efforts to control those pests.

Work conducted at Portsmouth University in 1986–1987 indicates Simulium spp. create highly acidic conditions within their midguts. This acidic environment provides conditions ideally suited to bacteria that metabolise cellulose. Insects cannot metabolise cellulose independently, but the presence of these bacteria allows cellulose to be metabolised into basic sugars. This provides nutrition to the black fly larvae, as well as the bacteria. This symbiotic relationship indicates a specific adaptation, as fresh-flowing streams could not provide sufficient nutrition to the growing larva in any other way.

== Regional effects of black fly populations ==
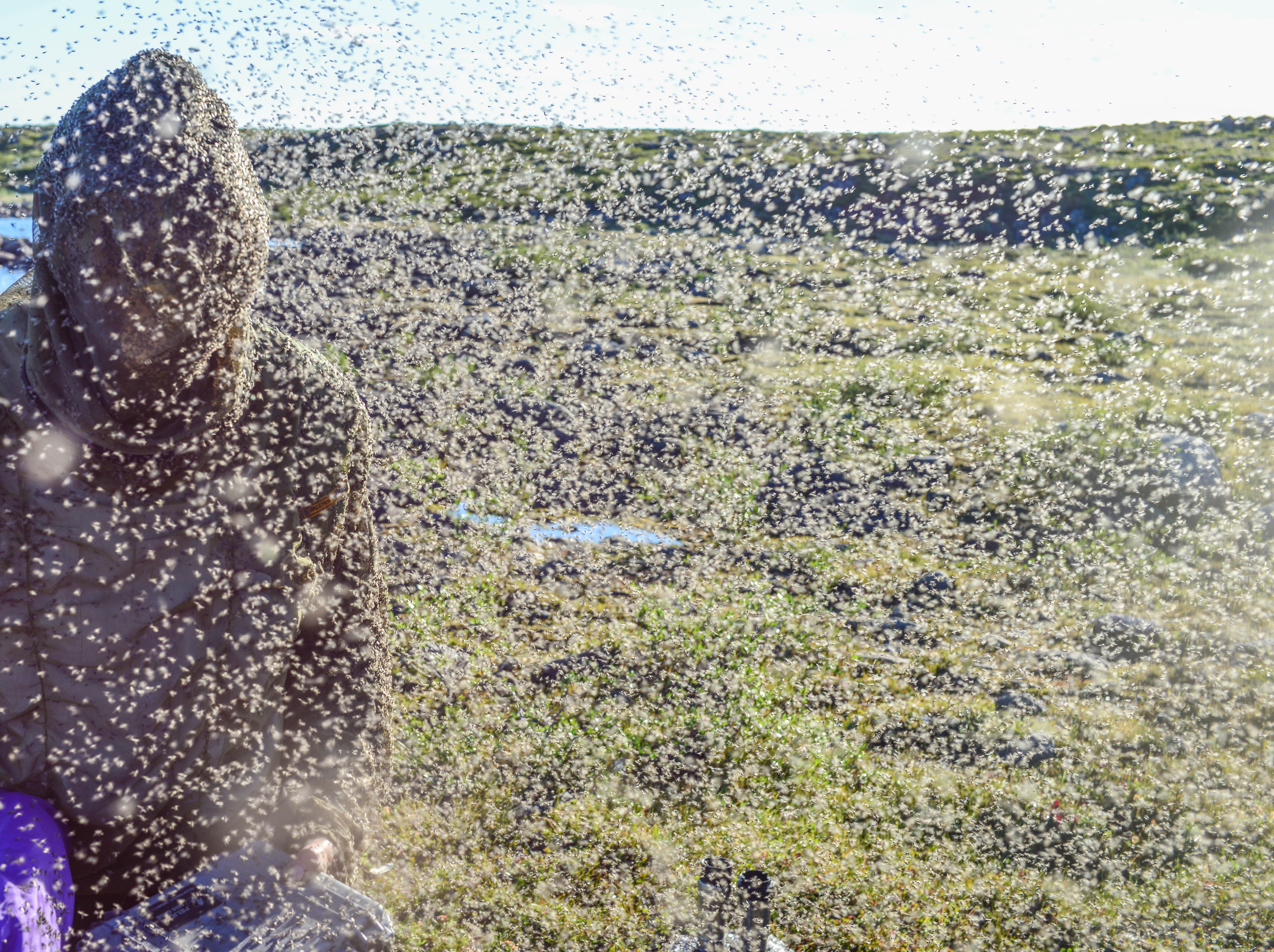
Black flies attack a canoe expedition in Dubawnt River, Nunavut.

- In the wetter parts of the northern latitudes of North America, including parts of Canada, New England, Upstate New York, Minnesota, and the Upper Peninsula of Michigan, black fly populations swell from late April to July, becoming a nuisance to humans engaging in outdoor activities, such as gardening, boating, camping, backpacking, and just walking. They can also be a significant nuisance in mountainous areas.
- Black flies are a scourge to livestock in Canada, where they can cause weight loss in cattle, and the saliva of one species can cause anaphylactic shock and death.
- Pennsylvania operates the largest single black fly control program in North America. The program benefits both the quality of life of residents and the state's tourism industry.
- The Blandford fly (Simulium posticatum) in England was once a public health problem in the area around Blandford Forum, Dorset, due to its large numbers and the painful lesions caused by its bite. It was eventually controlled by carefully targeted applications of Bacillus thuringiensis israelensis. In 2010, a summer surge of insect bites blamed on the Blandford fly required many who had been bitten to be treated in a hospital.
- The New Zealand biting "sandflies" are actually black flies of the species Austrosimulium australense and A. ungulatum.
- In parts of Scotland, various species of black flies are a nuisance and bite humans, mainly between May and September. They are found mainly in mixed birch and juniper woodlands, and at lower levels in pine forests, moorlands, and pastures. Bites are most often found on the head, neck, and back. They also frequently land on legs and arms.

== Public health ==
Only four genera in the family Simuliidae, Simulium, Prosimulium, Austrosimulium, and Cnephia, contain species that feed on people, though other species prefer to feed on other mammals or on birds. Simulium, the type genus, is the most widespread and is a vector for several diseases, including river blindness.

Mature adults can disperse tens or hundreds of miles from their breeding grounds in fresh flowing water, under their own power and assisted by prevailing winds, complicating control efforts. Swarming behavior can make outdoor activities unpleasant or intolerable, and can affect livestock production. During the 18th century, the "Golubatz fly" (Simulium colombaschense) was a notorious pest in central Europe. Even non-biting clouds of black flies, whether composed of males or of species that do not feed on humans or do not require a blood meal before egg laying, can form a nuisance by swarming into orifices.

Bites are shallow and accomplished by first stretching the skin using teeth on the labrum and then abrading it with the maxillae and mandibles, cutting the skin and rupturing its fine capillaries. Feeding is facilitated by a powerful anticoagulant in the flies' saliva, which also partially numbs the site of the bite, reducing the host's awareness of being bitten and thereby extending the flies' feeding time. Biting flies feed during daylight hours only and tend to zero in on areas of thinner skin, such as the nape of the neck or ears and ankles.

Itching and localized swelling and inflammation sometimes result from a bite. Swelling can be quite pronounced depending on the species and the individual's immune response, and irritation may persist for weeks. Intense feeding can cause "black fly fever", with headache, nausea, fever, swollen lymph nodes, and aching joints; these symptoms are probably a reaction to a compound from the flies' salivary glands. Less common severe allergic reactions may require hospitalization.

Repellents provide some protection against biting flies. Products containing the active ingredient ethyl butylacetylaminopropionate (IR3535), DEET (N,N-diethyl-meta-toluamide), or picaridin are most effective. Some beauty products have been found effective, and their use as insect repellents have been approved by EPA (e.g., Skin So Soft). However, given the limited effectiveness of repellents, protecting oneself against biting flies requires taking additional measures, such as avoiding areas inhabited by the flies, avoiding peak biting times, and wearing heavy-duty, light-colored clothing, including long-sleeve shirts, long pants and hats. When black flies are numerous and unavoidable, netting that covers the head, like the “bee bonnets” used by beekeepers, can provide protection.

Black flies are central to the transmission of the parasitic nematode Onchocerca volvulus which causes onchocerciasis, or "river blindness", which is endemic in parts of South America, Africa, and the Arabian Peninsula. They serve as the larval host for the nematode and act as the vector by which the disease is spread. The parasite lives on human skin and is transmitted to the black fly during feeding.

== See also ==
- "The Blackfly Song", a song by Wade Hemsworth inspired by his experiences with them in Northern Ontario
- Gnat
- Midge
- Use of DNA in forensic entomology
