= List of Simulium species =

This is a list of 1778 species in Simulium, a genus of black flies in the family Simuliidae.

== Simulium species ==
=== A ===
- Simulium abadii Takaoka, 2003^{c g}
- Simulium abatanense Takaoka, 1983^{c g}
- Simulium abberrans Delfinado, 1969^{c g}
- Simulium abbreviatum Rubtsov, 1957^{c g}
- Simulium acarayense Coscaron, Wygodzinsky, 1972^{i c g}
- Simulium acmeria (Ono, 1978)^{c g}
- Simulium acontum Chen, Zhang & Huang, 2005^{c g}
- Simulium acostai Takaoka, 1983^{c g}
- Simulium acrotrichum Rubtsov, 1956^{c g}
- Simulium acutum (Patrusheva, 1971)^{c g}
- Simulium adamsoni Edwards, 1932^{c g}
- Simulium adelaideae Craig, 2004^{c g}
- Simulium adersi Pomeroy, 1922^{c g}
- Simulium adleri Jitklang & Kuvangkadilok, 2008^{c g}
- Simulium admixtum Craig, 1987^{c g}
- Simulium admixum Craig, 1987^{g}
- Simulium adolfolutzi Wygodzinsky, 1951^{c g}
- Simulium adornatum (Rubtsov, 1956)^{c g}
- Simulium adsonense Craig, 2006^{c g}
- Simulium adventicium Datta, 1985^{c g}
- Simulium aemulum Rubtsov, 1940^{c g}
- Simulium aeneifacies Edwards, 1933^{c g}
- Simulium aequifurcatum Lutz, 1910^{c g}
- Simulium aestivum Davies, Peterson and Wood, 1962^{i c g}
- Simulium africanum Gibbins, 1934^{c g}
- Simulium afronuri Lewis & Disney, 1970^{c g}
- Simulium akopi Chubareva & Kachvoryan, 2000^{c g}
- Simulium akouense Fain & Elsen, 1973^{c g}
- Simulium alajense (Rubtsov, 1972)^{c g}
- Simulium alatum Fain & Dujardin, 1983^{c g}
- Simulium albanense Coscaron, 1991^{c g}
- Simulium albellum Rubtsov, 1947^{c g}
- Simulium alberti Takaoka, 2008^{c g}
- Simulium albicinctum (Enderlein, 1933)^{i c g}
- Simulium albilineatum (Enderlein, 1936)^{i c g}
- Simulium albivirgulatum Wanson & Henrard, 1944^{c g}
- Simulium albopictum Lane and Porto, 1940^{i c g}
- Simulium alcocki Pomeroy, 1922^{c g}
- Simulium alfurense Takaoka, 2003^{c g}
- Simulium alidae Pilaka & Elouard, 1997^{c g}
- Simulium alienigenum Takaoka, 1983^{c g}
- Simulium alirioi Perez and Vulcano, 1973^{i c g}
- Simulium alizadei Dzhafarov, 1954^{c g}
- Simulium allaeri Wanson, 1947^{c g}
- Simulium almae Yankovsky & Koshkimbaev, 1988^{c g}
- Simulium alpinum (Rubtsov, 1947)^{c g}
- Simulium altayense Cai, 2005^{c g}
- Simulium amazonicum Goeldi, 1905^{i c g}
- Simulium ambigens Definado, 1969^{c g}
- Simulium ambiguum Shiraki, 1935^{c g}
- Simulium ambonense Takaoka, 2003^{c g}
- Simulium ambositrae Grenier & Grjebine, 1959^{c g}
- Simulium ammosovi (Vorobets, 1984)^{c g}
- Simulium amurense (Rubtsov, 1956)^{c g}
- Simulium anaimense Coscaron & Munoz de Hoyos, 1995^{c g}
- Simulium anamariae Vulcano, 1962^{i c g}
- Simulium anatinum Wood, 1963^{i c g}
- Simulium anatolicum Craig, 1987^{c g}
- Simulium anchistinum Moulton & Adler, 1995^{c g}
- Simulium anduzei Vargas & Diaz Najera, 1948^{c g}
- Simulium anggiense Takaoka, 2003^{c g}
- Simulium angrense Pinto, 1931^{i c g}
- Simulium angulistylum Takaoka & Davies, 1995^{g}
- Simulium angustatum (Rubtsov, 1956)^{c g}
- Simulium angusticorne (Rubtsov, 1956)^{c g}
- Simulium angustifilum Rubtsov, 1947^{c g}
- Simulium angustifrons (Enderlein, 1921)^{c}
- Simulium angustifurca (Rubtsov, 1956)^{c g}
- Simulium angustipes Edwards, 1915^{c g}
- Simulium angustitarse (Lundstrom, 1911)^{c g}
- Simulium annae (Rubtsov, 1956)^{c g}
- Simulium annulatum Philippi, 1865^{c g}
- Simulium annuliforme (Rubtsov, 1962)^{c g}
- Simulium annulitarse (Zetterstedt, 1838)^{c g}
- Simulium annulum (Lundstrom, 1911)^{c g}
- Simulium annulus (Lundstrom, 1911)^{b} (loon blackfly)
- Simulium antenusi (Lane & Porto, 1940)^{c g}
- Simulium antibrachium Fain & Dujardin, 1983^{c g}
- Simulium antillarum Jennings, 1915^{i c g}
- Simulium antlerum Chen, 2001^{c g}
- Simulium antonii Wygodzinsky, 1953^{i c g}
- Simulium antunesi Lane and Porto, 1940^{i g}
- Simulium aokii (Takahasi, 1941)^{c g}
- Simulium apoense Takaoka, 1983^{c g}
- Simulium appalachiense Adler, Currie & Wood, 2004^{c g}
- Simulium apricarium Adler, Currie & Wood, 2004^{c g}
- Simulium arabicum Crosskey, 1982^{c g}
- Simulium arakawae Matsumura, 1921^{c g}
- Simulium aranti Stone and Snoddy, 1969^{i c g}
- Simulium arboreum Takaoka, 2006^{c g}
- Simulium arcabucense Coscaron, 1991^{c g}
- Simulium arcticum Malloch, 1914^{i c g}
- Simulium arctium (Rubtsov, 1956)^{c g}
- Simulium arenicola Liu, Gong, Zhang, Luo & An, 2003^{c g}
- Simulium arfakense Takaoka, 2003^{c g}
- Simulium argentatum Enderlein, 1936^{i c g}
- Simulium argenteostriatum Strobl, 1898^{c g}
- Simulium argentipes Edwards, 1928^{c g}
- Simulium argentipile (Rubtsov, 1962)^{c g}
- Simulium argentiscutum Shelley & Luna Dias, 1980^{c g}
- Simulium argus Williston, 1893^{i c g}
- Simulium argyreatum (Meigen, 1838)^{c g}
- Simulium argyrocinctum Meijere, 1913^{c g}
- Simulium arisanum Shiraki, 1935^{c g}
- Simulium arlecchinum Craig, 1987^{c g}
- Simulium armeniacum (Rubtsov, 1955)^{c g}
- Simulium armoricanum Doby & David, 1961^{c g}
- Simulium arnoldi Gibbins, 1937^{c g}
- Simulium aropaense Takaoka, 1995^{c g}
- Simulium arpiense (Terteryan & Kachvoryan, 1982)^{c g}
- Simulium arpiensis Terteryan & Kachvoryan, 1982^{c g}
- Simulium artum Sato, Takaoka & Saito, 2005^{c g}
- Simulium asakoae Takaoka & Davies, 1995^{g}
- Simulium asishi Datta, 1988^{c g}
- Simulium aspericorne Fain & Bafort, 1976^{c g}
- Simulium asperum Takaoka, 2003^{c g}
- Simulium assadovi (Dzhafarov, 1956)^{c g}
- Simulium asulcatum (Rubtsov, 1956)^{c g}
- Simulium atipornae Takaoka, Srisuka & Choochote, 2014^{g}
- Simulium atlanticum Crosskey, 1969^{c g}
- Simulium atlasicum Giudicelli & Bouzidi, 1989^{c g}
- Simulium atratoides Takaoka & Davies, 1996^{c g}
- Simulium atratum Meijere, 1913^{c g}
- Simulium atrum Delfinado, 1969^{c g}
- Simulium atyophilum Lewis & Disney, 1969^{c g}
- Simulium audreyae Garms & Disney, 1974^{c g}
- Simulium aureliani Fain, 1950^{c g}
- Simulium aureofulgens Terteryan, 1949^{c g}
- Simulium aureohirtum Brunetti, 1911^{c g}
- Simulium aureonigrum Mackerras & Mackerras, 1950^{c g}
- Simulium aureosimile Pomeroy, 1920^{c g}
- Simulium aureum Fries, 1824^{i c g}
- Simulium auricoma (Meigen, 1818)^{c g}
- Simulium auripellitum Enderlein, 1933^{i c g}
- Simulium auristriatum Lutz, 1910^{i c g}
- Simulium australe (Rubtsov, 1955)^{c g}
- Simulium avilae Smart & Clifford, 1965^{c g}
- Simulium awashense Uemoto, Ogata & Mebrahtu, 1977^{c g}
- Simulium ayrozai Vargas, 1945^{c g}
- Simulium azerbaidzhanicum (Dzhafarov, 1953)^{c g}
- Simulium azorense (Carlsson, 1963)^{c g}

=== B ===
- Simulium baatori (Rubtsov, 1967)^{c g}
- Simulium babai Takaoka & Aoki, 2007^{c g}
- Simulium babuyanense Takaoka & Tenedero, 2007^{c g}
- Simulium bachmaense Takaoka & Sofian-Azirun^{g}
- Simulium bachmanni Wygodzinsky & Coscaron, 1967^{c g}
- Simulium baetiphilum Lewis & Disney, 1972^{c g}
- Simulium baffinense Twinn, 1936^{i c g}
- Simulium baforti Fain & Dujardin, 1983^{c g}
- Simulium bagmaticum Markey, 1985^{c g}
- Simulium bahense Chen, 2003^{c g}
- Simulium baiense Pinto, 1931^{i g}
- Simulium baiensis Pinto, 1932^{c g}
- Simulium baimaii Takaoka & Kuvangkadilok, 1999^{c g}
- Simulium baisasae Delfinado, 1962^{c g}
- Simulium balcanicum (Enderlein, 1924)^{c g}
- Simulium baliemense Takaoka, 2003^{c g}
- Simulium baltazarae Delfinado, 1962^{c g}
- Simulium balteatum Adler, Currie & Wood, 2004^{c g}
- Simulium banahauense Takaoka, 2006^{c g}
- Simulium banaticum Dinulescu, 1966^{c g}
- Simulium banauense Takaoka, 1983^{c g}
- Simulium banksi Craig, 2006^{c g}
- Simulium banluangense Takaoka, Srisuka & Fukuda, 2020^{g}
- Simulium bannaense Chen & Zhang, 2003^{c g}
- Simulium bansonae Takaoka, 1983^{c g}
- Simulium barabense (Rubtsov, 1973)^{c g}
- Simulium baracorne Smart, 1944^{c g}
- Simulium barbatipes Enderlein, 1933^{i c g}
- Simulium barnesi Takaoka & Suzuki, 1984^{c g}
- Simulium barraudi Puri, 1932^{c g}
- Simulium barretti Smart & Clifford, 1965^{c g}
- Simulium bartangum Chubareva, 2000^{c g}
- Simulium bataksense Takaoka & Tenedero, 2007^{c g}
- Simulium batoense Edwards, 1934^{c g}
- Simulium bayakorum Fain & Elsen, 1974^{c g}
- Simulium beaupertuyi Perez, Rassi, Ramirez, 1977^{i c g}
- Simulium beiwanense Guo, Zhang, An, Zhang, Zhang, Dong, & Zhao, 2008^{c g}
- Simulium beltukovae (Rubtsov, 1956)^{c g}
- Simulium benjamini Dalamt, 1952^{c g}
- Simulium benquetense Takaoka, 1983^{c g}
- Simulium bequaerti Gibbins, 1936^{c g}
- Simulium berberum Giudicelli & Bouzidi, 1989^{c g}
- Simulium berchtesgadense ^{g}
- Simulium berghei Fain, 1949^{c g}
- Simulium bergi Rubtsov, 1956^{c g}
- Simulium beringovi Bodrova, 1988^{c g}
- Simulium berneri Freeman, 1954^{c g}
- Simulium bertrandi Grenier & Dorier, 1959^{c g}
- Simulium bezzii Corti, 1914^{c g}
- Simulium biakense Takaoka, 2003^{c g}
- Simulium biancoi (Rubtsov, 1964)^{c g}
- Simulium bicolense Takaoka, 1983^{c g}
- Simulium bicoloratum Malloch, 1913^{i g}
- Simulium bicorne Dorog., Rubtsov, and Vlasenko, 1935^{i c g}
- Simulium bicornutum Wygodzinsky & Coscaron, 1982^{c g}
- Simulium bidentatum (Shiraki, 1935)^{c g}
- Simulium bifenestratum Hamada & Pepinelli, 2004^{c g}
- Simulium bifila Freeman & Meillon, 1953^{c g}
- Simulium biforaminiferum Datta, 1974^{c g}
- Simulium bifurcatum Takaoka, 2003^{c g}
- Simulium bimaculatum (Rubtsov, 1956)^{c g}
- Simulium binuanense Takaoka, 2008^{c g}
- Simulium bipunctatum Malloch, 1912^{c g}
- Simulium biseriatum Rubtsov, 1940^{c g}
- Simulium bisnovem Gibbins, 1938^{c g}
- Simulium biuxinisa Coscaron & Ibanez Bernal, 1994^{c g}
- Simulium bivittatum Malloch, 1914^{i c g}
- Simulium blacklocki Meillon, 1930^{c g}
- Simulium blancasi Wygodzinsky, Coscaron, 1070^{i c g}
- Simulium blantoni Field, 1967^{c g}
- Simulium bobpetersoni Coscaron, Ibanez-Bernal & Coscaron-Arias, 1996^{c g}
- Simulium bogusium Craig, 1997^{c g}
- Simulium boldstemta (Ono, 1978)^{c g}
- Simulium bonaerense Coscaron & Wygodzinsky, 1984^{c g}
- Simulium bonninense (Shiraki, 1935)^{c g}
- Simulium bordai Coscaron, Wygodzinsky, 1910^{i c g}
- Simulium borneoense Takaoka, 2001^{c g}
- Simulium borunicornutum Pilaka & Elouard, 1999^{c g}
- Simulium botulibranchium Lutz, 1910^{i c g}
- Simulium botulus Smart & Clifford, 1965^{c g}
- Simulium bovis Meillon, 1930^{c g}
- Simulium brachium Gibbins, 1936^{c g}
- Simulium brachyantherum Rubtsov, 1947^{c g}
- Simulium brachyarthrum (Rubtsov, 1956)^{c g}
- Simulium brachycladum Lutz, Pinto, 1931^{i c g}
- Simulium brachystylum (Rubtsov, 1976)^{c g}
- Simulium bracteatum Coquillett, 1898^{i c g}
- Simulium brandti Smart & Clifford, 1965^{c g}
- Simulium bravermani Beaucournu-Saguez, 1986^{c g}
- Simulium brevicorne (Rubtsov, 1964)^{c g}
- Simulium brevidens (Rubtsov, 1956)^{c g}
- Simulium brevifile (Rubtsov, 1956)^{c g}
- Simulium breviflagellum Takaoka & Sofian-Azirun, 2015^{g}
- Simulium brevifurcatum Lutz, 1910^{i c g}
- Simulium brevilabrum Takaoka, 2006^{c g}
- Simulium brevitarse (Rubtsov, 1976)^{c g}
- Simulium brevitruncatum Takaoka, 2003^{c g}
- Simulium bricenoi Vargas, Palacios & Najera, 1946^{c g}
- Simulium brinchangense Takaoka, Sofian-Azirun & Hashim^{g}
- Simulium bronchiale (Rubtsov, 1962)^{c g}
- Simulium brunhesi Elouard & Ranaivoharindriaka, 1996^{c g}
- Simulium brunneum (Yankovsky, 1977)^{c g}
- Simulium bryopodium Delfinado, 1971^{c g}
- Simulium buckleyi Meillon, 1944^{c g}
- Simulium bucolicum Datta, 1975^{c g}
- Simulium buettikeri Crosskey & Roberts, 1994^{c g}
- Simulium buisseti Fain & Elsen, 1980^{c g}
- Simulium buissoni Roubaud, 1906^{c g}
- Simulium bujakovi Rubtsov, 1940^{c g}
- Simulium bukovskii Rubtsov, 1940^{c g}
- Simulium bulbiferum Fain & Dujardin, 1983^{c g}
- Simulium bulbosum Lewis, 1973^{c g}
- Simulium bulla Davies & Gyorkos, 1987^{c g}
- Simulium bullatum Takaoka & Choochote, 2005^{c g}
- Simulium burchi Dalmat, 1951^{c g}
- Simulium burgeri Adler, Currie & Wood, 2004^{c g}
- Simulium burmense Takaoka, 1989^{c g}
- Simulium bustosi Vargas & Palacios, 1946^{c g}
- Simulium buxtoni Austen, 1923^{c g}
- Simulium bwambanum ^{g}

=== C ===
- Simulium cabrerai Takaoka, 1983^{c g}
- Simulium caesariatum Craig & Joy, 2000^{c g}
- Simulium cagayanense Takaoka, 2005^{c g}
- Simulium caledonense Adler and Currie, 1986^{i c g}
- Simulium callidum Dyar and Shannon, 1927^{i c g}
- Simulium callipygium Craig, 2006^{c g}
- Simulium canadense Hearle, 1932^{i c g}
- Simulium candelabrum Fain & Dujardin, 1983^{c g}
- Simulium canescens Breme, 1842^{c g}
- Simulium cangshanense Xue, 1993^{c g}
- Simulium canlaonense Delfinado, 1969^{c g}
- Simulium canonicola (Dyar and Shannon, 1927)^{i c g}
- Simulium caohaiense Chen & Zhang, 1997^{c g}
- Simulium capricorne Leon, 1945^{c g}
- Simulium caprii Wygodzinsky & Coscaron, 1967^{c g}
- Simulium carbunculum Adler, Currie & Wood, 2004^{c g}
- Simulium carinatum Delfinado, 1969^{c g}
- Simulium carolinae Leon, 1945^{c g}
- Simulium carpathicum (Knoz, 1961)^{c g}
- Simulium carthusiense Grenier & Dorier, 1959^{c g}
- Simulium castaneum Craig, 1987^{c g}
- Simulium cataractarum Craig, 1987^{c g}
- Simulium catariense Pinto, 1932^{c g}
- Simulium catarinense Pinto, 1931^{i g}
- Simulium catleyi Smart & Clifford, 1965^{c g}
- Simulium caucasicum Rubtsov, 1940^{c g}
- Simulium cauchense Floch, Abonnenc, 1946^{i c g}
- Simulium cauveryense Anbalagan^{g}
- Simulium cavum Gibbins, 1938^{c g}
- Simulium celebesense Takaoka, 2003^{c g}
- Simulium celsum Takaoka & Davies, 1996^{c g}
- Simulium centrale Smart & Clifford, 1965^{c g}
- Simulium cerqueira Almeida, 1974^{i g}
- Simulium cerqueirai Barbosa de Almeida, 1979^{c g}
- Simulium cerradense Coscaron, de Cerqueira, Schumaker & La Salvia, 1992^{c g}
- Simulium cervicornutum Pomeroy, 1920^{c g}
- Simulium cervus Smart & Clifford, 1965^{c g}
- Simulium ceylonicum (Enderlein, 1921)^{c g}
- Simulium chainarongi Takaoka & Kuvangkadilok, 1999^{c g}
- Simulium chairuddini Takaoka, 2003^{c g}
- Simulium chalcocoma Knab, 1914^{i}
- Simulium chaliowae Takaoka & Kuvangkadilok, 1999^{c g}
- Simulium chamlongi Takaoka & Suzuki, 1984^{c g}
- Simulium chaowaense Takaoka, Srisuka & Saeung, 2020^{g}
- Simulium chaquense Coscaron, 1971^{c g}
- Simulium chaudinhense Takaoka & Sofian-Azirun^{g}
- Simulium cheedhangi Takaoka & Sofian-Azirun^{g}
- Simulium cheesmanae Edwards, 1927^{c g}
- Simulium chelevini (Ivashchenko, 1968)^{c g}
- Simulium cheni Xue, 1993^{c g}
- Simulium chenzhouense Chen, Zhang & Bi, 2004^{c g}
- Simulium chiangmaiense Takaoka & Suzuki, 1984^{c g}
- Simulium chiharuae Takaoka, Otsuka & Fukuda, 2007^{c g}
- Simulium chilianum Rondani, 1863^{c g}
- Simulium chimguazaense ^{g}
- Simulium chiriquiense Field, 1967^{c g}
- Simulium chitoense Takaoka, 1979^{c g}
- Simulium chlorum Moulton & Adler, 1995^{c g}
- Simulium cholodkovskii Rubtsov, 1940^{c g}
- Simulium chomustachi (Vorobets, 1977)^{c g}
- Simulium chongqingense Zhu & Wang, 1995^{c g}
- Simulium chongqingensis Zhu & Wang, 1995^{c g}
- Simulium choochotei Takaoka & Choochote, 2002^{c g}
- Simulium chovdica (Yankovsky, 1996)^{c g}
- Simulium chowettani Yankovsky, 1996^{c g}
- Simulium chowi Takaoka, 1979^{c g}
- Simulium christophersi Puri, 1932^{c g}
- Simulium chromatinum Adler, Currie & Wood, 2004^{c g}
- Simulium chromocentrum Adler, Currie & Wood, 2004^{c g}
- Simulium chubarevae (Kachvoryan & Terteryan, 1981)^{c g}
- Simulium chungi Takaoka & Huang, 2006^{c g}
- Simulium chutteri Lewis, 1965^{c g}
- Simulium claricentrum Adler, 1990^{c g}
- Simulium clarkei Stone and Snoddy, 1969^{i c g}
- Simulium clarki Fairchild, 1940^{i c g}
- Simulium clarum (Dyar & Shannon, 1927)^{c g}
- Simulium clathrinum Mackerras & Mackerras, 1948^{c g}
- Simulium clavibranchium Lutz, 1910^{i c g}
- Simulium clavum Smart & Clifford, 1965^{c g}
- Simulium clibanarium Craig, 1997^{c g}
- Simulium coalitum Pomeroy, 1922^{c g}
- Simulium coarctatum Rubtsov, 1940^{c g}
- Simulium codreanui (Sherban, 1958)^{c g}
- Simulium colasbelcouri Grenier & Ovazza, 1951^{c g}
- Simulium colombaschense (Scopoli, 1780)^{c g}
- Simulium concavustylum Deng, Zhang & Chen, 1995^{c g}
- Simulium concludium Craig, 1997^{c g}
- Simulium confertum Takaoka & Sofian-Azirun, 2015^{g}
- Simulium confusum Moulton & Adler, 1995^{c g}
- Simulium congareenarum (Dyar and Shannon, 1927)^{i c g}
- Simulium congi Takaoka & Sofian-Azirun, 2015^{g}
- Simulium congonse Gouteux, 1977^{c g}
- Simulium conicum Adler, Currie & Wood, 2004^{c g}
- Simulium connae Craig, 1997^{c g}
- Simulium consimile Puri, 1932^{c g}
- Simulium continii (Rivosecchi & Cardinali, 1975)^{c g}
- Simulium contractum Takaoka, 2003^{c g}
- Simulium contrerense Najera & Vulcano, 1962^{c g}
- Simulium conundrum Adler, Currie & Wood, 2004^{c g}
- Simulium conviti Perez and Vulcano, 1973^{i}
- Simulium copleyi Gibbins, 1941^{c g}
- Simulium corbis Twinn, 1936^{i c g}
- Simulium cormonsi Wygodzinsky, 1971^{i c g}
- Simulium corniferum (Yankovsky, 1979)^{c g}
- Simulium corpulentum Rubtsov, 1956^{c g}
- Simulium coscaroni Nascimento, Hamada & Adler, 2017^{g}
- Simulium costalimai Vargas & Palacios, 1946^{c g}
- Simulium costaricense Smart, 1944^{i c g}
- Simulium costatum Friederichs, 1920^{c g}
- Simulium cotabatoense Takaoka, 1983^{c g}
- Simulium cotopaxi Wygodzinsky and Coscaron, 1979^{i c g}
- Simulium courtneyi Takaoka & Adler, 1997^{c g}
- Simulium couverti (Rubtsov, 1964)^{c g}
- Simulium covagarciai Perez, Yarzabal & Tada, 1984^{c g}
- Simulium craigi Adler and Currie, 1986^{i c g}
- Simulium crassicaulum (Rubtsov, 1955)^{c g}
- Simulium crassifilum Rubtsov, 1947^{c g}
- Simulium crassimanum Edwards, 1933^{c g}
- Simulium crassum (Rubtsov, 1956)^{c g}
- Simulium cremnosi Davies & Gyorkos, 1987^{c g}
- Simulium crenobium (Knoz, 1961)^{c g}
- Simulium criniferum Nascimento, Hamada, Andrade-Souza & Adler, 2017^{g}
- Simulium cristalinum Coscaron & Py-Daniel, 1989^{c g}
- Simulium cristatum Smart & Clifford, 1965^{c g}
- Simulium croaticum (Baranov, 1937)^{c g}
- Simulium crocinum Takaoka & Choochote, 2005^{c g}
- Simulium crosskeyi Lewis & Disney, 1970^{c g}
- Simulium croxtoni Nicholson and Mickel, 1950^{i c g}
- Simulium cruszi Davies & Gyorkos, 1992^{c g}
- Simulium cryophilum (Rubtsov, 1959)^{c g}
- Simulium cuasiexiguum Shelley, Luna Dias, Maia-Herzog, Lowry, Garritano, Penn & Camargo, 2001^{c g}
- Simulium cuasisanguineum Perez & Yarzabal, 1982^{c g}
- Simulium cuneatum (Enderlein, 1936)^{i c g}
- Simulium curriei Adler & Wood, 1991^{c g}
- Simulium curtatum ^{g}
- Simulium curvans (Rubtsov & Carlsson, 1965)^{c g}
- Simulium curvastylum Chen & Zhang, 2001^{c g}
- Simulium curvistylus Rubtsov, 1957^{c g}
- Simulium curvitarse Rubtsov, 1940^{c g}
- Simulium curvum Takaoka, 2003^{c g}

=== D ===
- Simulium dachaisense Takaoka & Lau, 2015^{g}
- Simulium dahestanicum (Rubtsov, 1962)^{c g}
- Simulium daisense (Takahasi, 1950)^{c g}
- Simulium dalmati Vargas & Najera, 1948^{c g}
- Simulium daltanhani Hamada & Adler, 1998^{c g}
- Simulium damascenoi Py-Daniel, 1988^{c g}
- Simulium damingense Chen, Zhang & Zhang, 2007^{c g}
- Simulium damnosum Theobald, 1903^{c g}
- Simulium dandrettai Vargas, Palacios & Najera, 1946^{c g}
- Simulium danense Gouteux, 1979^{c g}
- Simulium danijari Chubareva & Ismagulov, 1992^{c g}
- Simulium darjeelingense Datta, 1973^{c g}
- Simulium dasguptai Datta, 1974^{c g}
- Simulium davaoense Takaoka, 1983^{c g}
- Simulium dawaense Uemoto, Ogata & Mebrahtu, 1977^{c g}
- Simulium deagostinii Coscaron & Wygodzinsky, 1962^{c g}
- Simulium debacli (Terteryan, 1952)^{c g}
- Simulium debegene Meillon, 1934^{c g}
- Simulium decafile (Rubtsov, 1976)^{c g}
- Simulium decafiliatum (Yankovsky, 1996)^{c g}
- Simulium decimatum Dorogostaisky & Vlasenko, 1935^{c g}
- Simulium decimfiliatum (Rubtsov, 1956)^{c g}
- Simulium decollectum Adler and Currie, 1986^{i c g}
- Simulium decolletum Adler & Currie, 1986^{c g}
- Simulium decorum Walker, 1848^{i c g}
- Simulium decuplum Takaoka & Davies, 1995^{g}
- Simulium definitum Moulton & Adler, 1995^{c g}
- Simulium defoliarti Stone and Peterson, 1958^{i c g}
- Simulium degrangei Dorier & Grenier, 1960^{c g}
- Simulium dehnei Field, 1969^{c g}
- Simulium dekeyseri Shelley & Py-Daniel, 1981^{c g}
- Simulium delatorrei Dalmat, 1950^{c g}
- Simulium delfinadoae Takaoka, 1983^{c g}
- Simulium delizhanense (Rubtsov, 1955)^{c g}
- Simulium delponteianum Wygoszinsky, 1961^{c g}
- Simulium demutaense Takaoka, 2003^{c g}
- Simulium dendrofilum (Patrusheva, 1962)^{c g}
- Simulium dentatum Puri, 1932^{c g}
- Simulium dentatura (Vorobets, 1984)^{c g}
- Simulium dentistylum Takaoka & Davies, 1995^{g}
- Simulium dentulosum Roubaud, 1915^{c g}
- Simulium deserticola Rubtsov, 1940^{c g}
- Simulium desertorum Rubtsov, 1938^{c g}
- Simulium desirei Pilaka & Elouard, 1999^{c g}
- Simulium diamantinum Coscaron & Coscaron-Arias, 1996^{c g}
- Simulium diaznajerai Vargas, 1943^{c g}
- Simulium diceros Freeman & Meillon, 1953^{c g}
- Simulium dieguerense Vajime & Dunbar, 1975^{c g}
- Simulium digitatum Puri, 1932^{c g}
- Simulium digrammicum Edwards, 1928^{c g}
- Simulium dinakarani Anbalagan, Vijayan, Balachandran, Thiyonila & Surya, 2020^{g}
- Simulium dinellii Joan, 1912^{i c g}
- Simulium discrepans Delfinado, 1969^{c g}
- Simulium disneyi Takaoka & Roberts, 1988^{c g}
- Simulium distinctum Lutz, 1910^{c g}
- Simulium diversibranchium Lutz, 1910^{i c g}
- Simulium diversifurcatum Lutz, 1910^{i}
- Simulium dixiense Stone and Snoddy, 1969^{i c g}
- Simulium djafarovi (Rubtsov, 1962)^{c g}
- Simulium djallonense Roubaud & Grenier, 1943^{c g}
- Simulium djebaglense (Rubtsov, 1956)^{c g}
- Simulium dogieli (Rubtsov, 1956)^{c g}
- Simulium doipuiense Takaoka & Choochote, 2005^{c g}
- Simulium doisaketense ^{g}
- Simulium dojeycorium Craig, 1997^{c g}
- Simulium dola Davies & Gyorkos, 1987^{c g}
- Simulium dolini Usova & Sukhomlin, 1989^{c g}
- Simulium dolomitense (Rivosecchi, 1971)^{c g}
- Simulium donovani Vargas, 1943^{c g}
- Simulium downsi Vargas, Palacio, Nayera, 1946^{i c g}
- Simulium dubitskii (Yankovsky, 1996)^{c g}
- Simulium duboisi Fain, 1950^{c g}
- Simulium dudgeoni Takaoka & Davies, 1995^{c g}
- Simulium dugesi Vargas, Palacios & Najera, 1946^{c g}
- Simulium dukei Lewis, Disney & Crosskey, 1969^{c g}
- Simulium dumogaense Takaoka & Roberts, 1988^{c g}
- Simulium dunfellense (Davies, 1966)^{c g}
- Simulium dunhuangense Liu & An, 2004^{c g}
- Simulium duodecimcornutum (Rubtsov, 1956)^{c g}
- Simulium duodecimum Gibbins, 1936^{c g}
- Simulium duodenicornium Pipinelli, Hamada & Trivinho-Strixino, 2005^{c g}
- Simulium duolongum Takaoka & Davies, 1995^{g}
- Simulium duplex Shewell and Fredeen, 1958^{i c g}
- Simulium dureti Wygodzinsky, Coscaron, 1967^{i c g}
- Simulium dussertorum Craig, 1997^{c g}
- Simulium dycei Colbo, 1976^{c g}

=== E ===
- Simulium earlei Vargas & Najera, 1946^{c g}
- Simulium ecuadoriense Enderlein, 1934^{i g}
- Simulium edwardsi (Enderlein, 1934)^{c g}
- Simulium egregium Seguy, 1930^{c g}
- Simulium ekomei Lewis & Disney, 1972^{c g}
- Simulium ela Davies & Gyorkos, 1987^{c g}
- Simulium elatum (Rubtsov, 1955)^{c g}
- Simulium elburnum (Rubtsov & Carlsson, 1965)^{c g}
- Simulium elongatum Takaoka, 2003^{c g}
- Simulium emarginatum Davies, Peterson and Wood, 1962^{i c g}
- Simulium emiliae (Rubtsov, 1976)^{c g}
- Simulium empascae Py-Daniel & Moreira, 1988^{c g}
- Simulium empopomae Meillon, 1937^{c g}
- Simulium encisoi Vargas and Diaz Najera, 1949^{i c g}
- Simulium englundi Craig, 2004^{c g}
- Simulium eouzani Germain & Grenier, 1970^{c g}
- Simulium ephemerophilum Rubtsov, 1947^{c g}
- Simulium ephippioidum Chen & Wen, 1999^{c g}
- Simulium epistum Delfinado, 1971^{c g}
- Simulium equinum (Linnaeus, 1758)^{c g}
- Simulium erectum (Rubtsov, 1959)^{c g}
- Simulium erimoense (Ono, 1980)^{c g}
- Simulium erythrocephalum (De Geer, 1776)^{c g}
- Simulium escomeli Roubaud, 1909^{i c g}
- Simulium estevezi Vargas, 1945^{c g}
- Simulium ethelae Dalmat, 1950^{i c g}
- Simulium ethiopiense Fain & Oomen, 1968^{c g}
- Simulium euryadminiculum Davies, 1949^{i c g}
- Simulium euryplatamus Sun & Song, 1995^{c g}
- Simulium evelynae Smart & Clifford, 1965^{c g}
- Simulium evenhuisi Craig, 1997^{c g}
- Simulium evillense Fain, Hallot & Bafort, 1966^{c g}
- Simulium exasperans Craig, 1987^{c g}
- Simulium excisum Davies, Peterson and Wood, 1962^{i c g}
- Simulium exiguum Roubaud, 1906^{i c g}
- Simulium exile (Rubtsov, 1956)^{c g}
- Simulium eximium Meijere, 1913^{c g}
- Simulium exulatum Adler, Currie & Wood, 2004^{c g}

=== F ===
- Simulium faheyi Taylor, 1927^{c g}
- Simulium falcoe (Shiraki, 1935)^{c g}
- Simulium falculatum (Enderlein, 1929)^{c g}
- Simulium fallisi (Golini, 1975)^{c g}
- Simulium fangense Takaoka, 2006^{c g}
- Simulium fanjingshanense Chen, Zhang & Wen, 2000^{c g}
- Simulium fararae Craig & Joy, 2000^{c g}
- Simulium farciminis Smart & Clifford, 1965^{c g}
- Simulium fenestratum Edwards, 1934^{c g}
- Simulium ferganicum Rubtsov, 1940^{c g}
- Simulium feuerborni Edwards, 1934^{c g}
- Simulium fibrinflatum Twinn, 1936^{i c g b} (inflated gnat)
- Simulium fidum Datta, 1975^{c g}
- Simulium fimbriatum Smart & Clifford, 1965^{c g}
- Simulium fionae Adler, 1990^{c g}
- Simulium flaveolum Rubtsov, 1940^{c g}
- Simulium flavicans Rubtsov, 1956^{c g}
- Simulium flavidum Rubtsov, 1947^{c g}
- Simulium flavifemur Enderlein, 1921^{i g}
- Simulium flavigaster Rubtsov, 1969^{c g}
- Simulium flavinotatum Fain & Dujardin, 1983^{c g}
- Simulium flavipes Austen, 1921^{c g}
- Simulium flavipictum Knab, 1914^{i c g}
- Simulium flavoantennatum Rubtsov, 1940^{c g}
- Simulium flavocinctum Edwards, 1934^{c g}
- Simulium flavopubescens Lutz, 1910^{i}
- Simulium flavum Takaoka, 2003^{c g}
- Simulium flexibranchium Crosskey, 2001^{c g}
- Simulium florae (Dzhafarov, 1954)^{c g}
- Simulium floresense Takaoka, 2006^{c g}
- Simulium fluviatile Radzivilovskaya, 1948^{c g}
- Simulium fontanum Terteryan, 1952^{c g}
- Simulium fontinale Radzivilovskaya, 1948^{c g}
- Simulium fontium (Rubtsov, 1955)^{c g}
- Simulium forcipatum Delfinado, 1969^{c g}
- Simulium fossatiae Craig, 1997^{c g}
- Simulium fragai Abreu, 1960^{c g}
- Simulium freemani Vargas & Najera, 1949^{c g}
- Simulium friederichsi Edwards, 1934^{c g}
- Simulium friedlanderi Py-Daniel, 1987^{c g}
- Simulium frigidum Rubtsov, 1940^{c g}
- Simulium fucense (Rivosecchi, 1962)^{c g}
- Simulium fujianense Zhang-tao & Wang, 1991^{c g}
- Simulium fuliginis Field, 1969^{c g}
- Simulium fulvibnotum Cerqueira and Mello, 1968^{i g}
- Simulium fulvipes (Ono, 1978)^{c g}
- Simulium furcillatum Wygodzinsky & Coscaron, 1982^{c g}
- Simulium furculatum (Shewell, 1952)^{i c g}
- Simulium fuscatum Yankovsky, 1996^{c g}
- Simulium fuscicorne Fain, 1950^{c g}
- Simulium fuscidorsum Takaoka^{g}
- Simulium fuscinervis Edwards, 1933^{c g}
- Simulium fuscitarse Takaoka, 2003^{c g}
- Simulium fuscopilosum Edwards, 1928^{c g}
- Simulium fuscum (Rubtsov, 1963)^{c g}
- Simulium futaense Garms & Post, 1966^{c g}
- Simulium fuzhouense Zhang & Wang, 1991^{c g}

=== G ===
- Simulium gabaldoni Perez, 1971^{i c g}
- Simulium gabovae (Rubtsov, 1966)^{c g}
- Simulium gagiduense Smart & Clifford, 1965^{c g}
- Simulium gallinum Edwards, 1932^{c g}
- Simulium galloprovinciale Giuducelli, 1963^{c g}
- Simulium ganalesense Vargas & Palacios, 1946^{c g}
- Simulium gariepsense Meillon, 1953^{c g}
- Simulium garmsi Crosskey, 1969^{c g}
- Simulium garniense (Rubtsov, 1955)^{c g}
- Simulium gatchaliani Takaoka, 1983^{c g}
- Simulium gaudeatum Knab, 1914^{i g}
- Simulium gaurani Coscaron and Wygodzinsky, 1972^{i g}
- Simulium geigyi Garms & Hausermann, 1968^{c g}
- Simulium gejgelense (Dzhafarov, 1954)^{c g}
- Simulium germuense Liu, Gong, Zhang, Luo & An, 2003^{c g}
- Simulium ghoomense Datta, 1975^{c g}
- Simulium gibense Uemoto, Ogata & Mebrahtu, 1977^{c g}
- Simulium giganteum Rubtzov, 1940^{i c g}
- Simulium gilleti Fain & Hallot, 1964^{c g}
- Simulium gimpuense Takaoka, 2003^{c g}
- Simulium glatthaari Takaoka & Davies, 1995^{c g}
- Simulium globosum Takaoka, 2003^{c g}
- Simulium goeldi Cerqueira and Mello, 1967^{i}
- Simulium goeldii Cerqueira & Mello, 1967^{c g}
- Simulium goinyi Lewis & Hanney, 1965^{c g}
- Simulium golani (Beaucornu-Saguez, 1977)^{c g}
- Simulium gombakense Takaoka & Davies, 1995^{g}
- Simulium gomphocorne (Rubtsov, 1964)^{c g}
- Simulium gonzalezherrejoni Diaz Najera, 1969^{c g}
- Simulium gonzalezi Vargas & Díaz Nájera, 1953^{c g}
- Simulium gorokae Smart & Clifford, 1965^{c g}
- Simulium gouldingi Stone, 1952^{i c g}
- Simulium gracile Datta, 1973^{c g}
- Simulium gracilipes Edwards, 1921^{c g}
- Simulium gravelyi Puri, 1933^{c g}
- Simulium grenieri Pilaka & Elouard, 1999^{c g}
- Simulium grerreroi Perez, 1071^{i g}
- Simulium gribae Rubtsov, 1956^{c g}
- Simulium griseicolle Becker, 1903^{c g}
- Simulium griseifrons Brunetti, 1911^{c g}
- Simulium grisescens Brunetti, 1911^{c g}
- Simulium griseum Coquillett, 1898^{i c g}
- Simulium griveaudi Ovazzar & Ovazza, 1970^{c g}
- Simulium grossifilum Takaoka & Davies, 1995^{g}
- Simulium guamense Stone, 1964^{c g}
- Simulium guaporense Py-Daniel, 1989^{c g}
- Simulium guerrerense Vargas & Najera, 1956^{c g}
- Simulium guerreroi Ramirez-Perez, 1971^{c g}
- Simulium guianense Wise, 1911^{i c g}
- Simulium guimari Becker, 1908^{c g}
- Simulium guniki Takaoka, 2001^{c g}
- Simulium gurneyae Senior-White, 1922^{c g}
- Simulium gusevi Rubtsov, 1976^{c g}
- Simulium gutsevitshi (Yankovsky, 1978)^{c g}
- Simulium guttatum (Enderlein, 1936)^{i c g}
- Simulium gviletense (Rubtsov, 1956)^{c g}
- Simulium gyas Meillon, 1951^{c g}
- Simulium gyorkosae Takaoka & Davies, 1996^{c g}

=== H ===
- Simulium hackeri Edwards, 1929^{c g}
- Simulium hadiae Takaoka, 2003^{c g}
- Simulium haematopotum Malloch, 1914^{i c g}
- Simulium haematoptum Malloch^{i g}
- Simulium hagai Takaoka, 2003^{c g}
- Simulium haiduanens Takaoka, Low & Huang, 2018^{g}
- Simulium hailuogouense Chen, Huang & Zhang, 2005^{c g}
- Simulium halmaheraense Takaoka, 2003^{c g}
- Simulium hargreavesi Gibbins, 1934^{c g}
- Simulium harrisoni Freeman & Meillon, 1953^{c g}
- Simulium haysi Stone and Snoddy, 1969^{i c g}
- Simulium hechti Vargas, Martinez Palacios & Diaz Najera, 1946^{c g}
- Simulium hectorvargasi Coscaron & Wygodzinsky, 1972^{c g}
- Simulium heishuiense Wen & Chen, 2006^{c g}
- Simulium heldsbachense Smart & Clifford, 1965^{c g}
- Simulium hematophilum Laboulbene, 1882^{c g}
- Simulium hemicyclium Smart & Clifford, 1965^{c g}
- Simulium henanense Wen & Chen, 2007^{c g}
- Simulium hengshanense Bi & Chen, 2004^{c g}
- Simulium heptapotamicum (Rubtsov, 1940)^{c g}
- Simulium heptaspicae Gouteux, 1977^{c g}
- Simulium herreri Wygodzinsky and Coscaron, 1967^{i c g}
- Simulium hessei Gibbins, 1941^{c g}
- Simulium hibernale (Rubtsov, 1967)^{c g}
- Simulium hiemale Rubtsov, 1956^{c g}
- Simulium hieroglyphicum Peterson, Vargas & Ramirez-Perez, 1988^{c g}
- Simulium hightoni Lewis, 1961^{c g}
- Simulium himalayense Puri, 1932^{c g}
- Simulium hinmani Vargas & Najera, 1946^{c g}
- Simulium hiroshii Takaoka, 1994^{c g}
- Simulium hiroyukii ^{g}
- Simulium hirsutilateris Meillon, 1937^{c g}
- Simulium hirsutum Pomeroy, 1922^{c g}
- Simulium hirticranioum Craig & Joy, 2000^{g}
- Simulium hirticranium Craig & Joy, 2000^{c g}
- Simulium hirtinervis Edwards, 1928^{c g}
- Simulium hirtipannus Puri, 1932^{c g}
- Simulium hirtipupa Lutz, 1910^{i c g}
- Simulium hispaniola Grenier & Bertrand, 1954^{c g}
- Simulium hispidum Craig & Joy, 2000^{c g}
- Simulium hissetteum Gibbins, 1936^{c g}
- Simulium hmongense Takaoka^{g}
- Simulium hoffmanni Vargas, 1943^{i c g}
- Simulium hoiseni Takaoka, 2008^{c g}
- Simulium hongpingense Cheng, Luo & Yang, 2006^{c g}
- Simulium hongthaii Takaoka & Sofian-Azirun^{g}
- Simulium horacioi Okazawa & Onishi, 1980^{c g}
- Simulium horocochuspi Coscaron & Wygodzinsky, 1972^{c g}
- Simulium horokaense Ono, 1980^{c g}
- Simulium horvathi (Enderlein, 1922)^{c g}
- Simulium howletti Puri, 1932^{c g}
- Simulium huaimorense Takaoka, Srisuka & Saeung, 2020^{g}
- Simulium huairayacu Wygodzinsky, 1953^{c g}
- Simulium huangi Huang, 2017^{g}
- Simulium huemul Wygodzinsky & Coscaron, 1967^{c g}
- Simulium huense Takaoka^{g}
- Simulium hukaense Sechan, 1983^{c g}
- Simulium humerosum Rubtsov, 1947^{c g}
- Simulium hunanense Zhang & Chen, 2004^{c g}
- Simulium hunteri Malloch, 1914^{i c g}

=== I ===
- Simulium ibarakiense Takaoka & Saito, 2007^{c g}
- Simulium ibariense Zivkovic & Grenier, 1959^{c g}
- Simulium ibericum Crosskey & Santos Gracio, 1985^{c g}
- Simulium ibleum (Rivosecchi, 1966)^{c g}
- Simulium ichnusae (Rivosecchi, 1993)^{c g}
- Simulium ifugaoense Takaoka, 1983^{c g}
- Simulium ignacioi Perez and Vulcano, 1973^{i}
- Simulium ignescens Roubaud, 1906^{i c g}
- Simulium iguazuense Coscaron, 1976^{c g}
- Simulium imerinae Roubaud, 1905^{c g}
- Simulium immortalis Cai, An, Li & Yan, 2004^{c g}
- Simulium impar Davies, Peterson and Wood, 1962^{i c g}
- Simulium impukane Meillon, 1936^{c g}
- Simulium inaequale Paterson Ans Shannon, 1927^{i c g}
- Simulium incanum (Loew, 1840)^{c g}
- Simulium incertum Lutz, 1910^{i c g}
- Simulium incognitum Adler & Mason, 1997^{c g}
- Simulium incrustatum Lutz, 1910^{i c g}
- Simulium indica Singh Sidhu, 2005^{c g}
- Simulium indicum Becher, 1885^{c g}
- Simulium inermum Takaoka, 2003^{c g}
- Simulium inexorabile Schrottky, 1909^{i}
- Simulium infenestrum Moulton & Adler, 1995^{c g}
- Simulium infernale Adler, Currie & Wood, 2004^{c g}
- Simulium inflatum (Rubtsov, 1951)^{c g}
- Simulium innocens (Shewell, 1952)^{i c g}
- Simulium inornatum Mackerras & Mackerras, 1950^{c g}
- Simulium intermedium Roubaud, 1906^{c g}
- Simulium inthanonense Takaoka & Suzuki, 1984^{c g}
- Simulium inuitkiense Smart & Clifford, 1965^{c g}
- Simulium iphias Meillon, 1951^{c g}
- Simulium iracouboense Floch and Abonnenc, 1946^{i c g}
- Simulium irayense Takaoka, 2003^{c g}
- Simulium irianense Takaoka, 2003^{c g}
- Simulium iridescens Meijere, 1913^{c g}
- Simulium itaunense D'andretta and Gonzalez, 1964^{i c g}
- Simulium itelmenica (Chubareva & Yankovsky, 2006)^{c g}
- Simulium ituriense Fain, 1951^{c g}
- Simulium itwariense ^{g}
- Simulium ivashchenkoi (Yankovsky, 1996)^{c g}
- Simulium ivdelensis Yankovsky, 2000^{c g}
- Simulium iwahigense Takaoka, 1983^{c g}
- Simulium iwatense (Shiraki, 1935)^{c g}
- Simulium izuense Takaoka & Saito, 2005^{c g}

=== J ===
- Simulium jacobsi Dalmat, 1953^{c g}
- Simulium jacumbae Dyar and Shannon, 1927^{i c g}
- Simulium jacuticum Rubtsov, 1940^{c g}
- Simulium jaimeramirezi Wygodzinsky, 1971^{i c g}
- Simulium jani Lewis, 1973^{c g}
- Simulium janzeni Enderlein, 1922^{c g}
- Simulium janzi Abreu, 1961^{c g}
- Simulium japonicum Matsumura, 1931^{c g}
- Simulium jasgulemum Chubareva, 2000^{c g}
- Simulium jayapuraense Takaoka, 2003^{c g}
- Simulium jefersoni Hamada, Hernandez, Luz & Pepinelli, 2006^{c g}
- Simulium jeffreyi Takaoka & Davies, 1995^{g}
- Simulium jenningsi Malloch, 1914^{i c g}
- Simulium jerantutense Takaoka & Sofian-Azirun^{g}
- Simulium jerezense Diaz Najera, 1969^{c g}
- Simulium jeteri Py-Daniel, 2005^{c g}
- Simulium jianjinshanense Zhang & Chen, 2006^{c g}
- Simulium jieyangense An, Yan & Yang, 1994^{c g}
- Simulium jilinense Chen & Cao, 1983^{c g}
- Simulium jilinensis Chen & Cao, 1983^{c g}
- Simulium jimmaense Uemoto, Ogata & Mebrahtu, 1977^{c g}
- Simulium jinbianense Zhang & Chen, 2004^{c g}
- Simulium jnabsium Craig, 1997^{c g}
- Simulium jobbinsi Vargas & Palacios, 1946^{c g}
- Simulium joculator Adler, Currie & Wood, 2004^{c g}
- Simulium johannae Wanson, 1947^{c g}
- Simulium johannseni Hart, 1912^{i c g}
- Simulium johnfrumi Craig, 2006^{c g}
- Simulium johnsoni Vargas & Najera, 1957^{c g}
- Simulium jolyi Roubaud, 1906^{c g}
- Simulium jonesi Stone and Snoddy, 1969^{i c g}
- Simulium josephi Smart & Clifford, 1965^{c g}
- Simulium joyae Craig & Joy, 2000^{c g}
- Simulium juarezi Vargas & Najera, 1957^{c g}
- Simulium jugatum Boldarueva, 1979^{c g}
- Simulium jujuyense Paterson and Shannon, 1927^{i c g}
- Simulium jundiaiense D'andretta and Gonzalez, 1964^{i}
- Simulium junkumae Takaoka, Srisuka & Saeung, 2020^{g}
- Simulium juxtacrenobium Bass & Brockhouse, 1990^{c g}
- Simulium juxtadamnosum Gouteux, 1978^{c g}

=== K ===
- Simulium kabanayense Perez and Volcano, 1973^{i c g}
- Simulium kachvorjanae Ussova, 1991^{c g}
- Simulium kaffaense Hadis, Wilson, Cobblah & Boakye, 2005^{c g}
- Simulium kainantuense Smart & Clifford, 1965^{c g}
- Simulium kaiti Smart & Clifford, 1965^{c g}
- Simulium kalimerahense Takaoka, 2003^{c g}
- Simulium kambaitense Takaoka, 1989^{c g}
- Simulium kamimurai Takaoka, 2003^{c g}
- Simulium kamtshadalicum Yankovsky, 1996^{c g}
- Simulium kamtshaticum Rubtsov, 1940^{c g}
- Simulium kanchaveli (Machavariani, 1966)^{c g}
- Simulium kapuri Datta, 1975^{c g}
- Simulium karasuae Panchenko, 1998^{c g}
- Simulium karavalliense Anbalagan, Rekha, Balachandran, Dinakaran & Krishnan, 2020^{g}
- Simulium karenkoense (Shiraki, 1935)^{c g}
- Simulium kariyai (Takahasi, 1940)^{c g}
- Simulium karzhantavicum (Rubtsov, 1956)^{c g}
- Simulium kaszabi (Rubtsov, 1969)^{c g}
- Simulium katangae Fain, 1951^{c g}
- Simulium katoi Shiraki, 1935^{c g}
- Simulium kauntzeum Gibbins, 1938^{c g}
- Simulium kawagishii Takaoka & Suzuki, 1995^{c g}
- Simulium kawamurae Matsummura, 1931^{c g}
- Simulium kazahstanicum (Rubtsov, 1976)^{c g}
- Simulium keenani Field, 1969^{c g}
- Simulium keiseri (Rubtsov, 1955)^{c g}
- Simulium keningauense Takaoka, 2008^{c g}
- Simulium kenyae Meillon, 1940^{c g}
- Simulium keravatense Smart & Clifford, 1965^{c g}
- Simulium kerei Takaoka & Suzuki, 1994^{c g}
- Simulium kerisorum (Rubtsov, 1956)^{c g}
- Simulium kerzhneri (Rubtsov, 1975)^{c g}
- Simulium khunklangense Takaoka & Srisuka^{g}
- Simulium kiangaraense Pilaka & Elouard, 1999^{c g}
- Simulium kietaense Takaoka, 1995^{c g}
- Simulium kiewfinense Takaoka, Srisuka & Fukuda, 2020^{g}
- Simulium kiewmaepanense Takaoka, Srisuka & Saeung, 2017^{g}
- Simulium kilibanum Gouteux, 1977^{c g}
- Simulium kinabaluense Smart & Clifford, 1969^{c g}
- Simulium kingundense Fain & Elsen, 1974^{c g}
- Simulium kipengere Krueger, 2006^{c g}
- Simulium kirgisorum (Rubtsov, 1956)^{c g}
- Simulium kiritshenkoi (Rubtsov, 1940)^{c g}
- Simulium kisoense Uemoto, Onishi & Orii, 1974^{c g}
- Simulium kitetense Elsen & Post, 1989^{c g}
- Simulium kivuense Gouteux, 1978^{c g}
- Simulium klonglanense Takaoka, Srisuka & Saeung, 2020^{g}
- Simulium knidirii Giudicelli & Thiery, 1985^{c g}
- Simulium kobayashii Okamoto, Sato & Shogaki, 1958^{c g}
- Simulium koidzumii (Tashasi, 1940)^{c g}
- Simulium kokodae Smart & Clifford, 1965^{c g}
- Simulium kolakaense Takaoka, 2003^{c g}
- Simulium kompi Dalmat, 1951^{c g}
- Simulium konakovi Rubtsov, 1956^{c g}
- Simulium konkourense Boakye, Post, Mosha & Quillevere, 1993^{c g}
- Simulium konoi (Takashasi, 1950)^{c g}
- Simulium kozlovi Rubtsov, 1940^{c g}
- Simulium krebsorum Moulton & Adler, 1992^{c g}
- Simulium krishnani Anbalagan, Vijayan, Balachandran, Thiyonila & Surya, 2020^{g}
- Simulium krombeini Davies & Gyorkos, 1987^{c g}
- Simulium krymense (Rubtsov, 1956)^{c g}
- Simulium kuandianense Chen & Cao, 1983^{c g}
- Simulium kuandianensis Chen & Cao, 1983^{c g}
- Simulium kugartsuense (Rubtsov, 1956)^{c g}
- Simulium kugitangi Yankovsky & Shinkovsky, 1992^{c g}
- Simulium kuingingiense Smart & Clifford, 1965^{c g}
- Simulium kummbakkaraiense Anbalagan, Vijayan, Dinakaran & Krishnan, 2019^{g}
- Simulium kumboense Grenier & Germain, 1966^{c g}
- Simulium kurense Rubtsov & Dzhafarov, 1951^{c g}
- Simulium kurganense (Rubtsov, 1956)^{c g}
- Simulium kurilense Rubtsov, 1956^{c g}
- Simulium kuznetzovi Rubtsov, 1940^{c g}
- Simulium kwangoense Fain & Elsen, 1974^{c g}
- Simulium kyushuense Takaoka, 1978^{c g}

=== L ===
- Simulium labellei Peterson, 1993^{c g}
- Simulium lacduongense Takaoka^{g}
- Simulium laciniatum Edwards, 1924^{c g}
- Simulium lagunaense Takaoka, 1983^{c g}
- Simulium lahillei Paterson and Shannon, 1927^{i c g}
- Simulium lakei Snoddy, 1976^{i c g}
- Simulium lalokiense Smart & Clifford, 1965^{c g}
- Simulium lama Rubtsov, 1940^{c g}
- Simulium lamachi Doby & David, 1960^{c g}
- Simulium lamdongense Takaoka & Sofian-Azirun, 2015^{g}
- Simulium lampangense Takaoka & Choochote, 2005^{c g}
- Simulium landonoense Takaoka, 2003^{c g}
- Simulium laneportoi Vargas, 1941^{i c g}
- Simulium langbiangense Takaoka & Sofian-Azirun^{g}
- Simulium languidum Davies & Gyorkos, 1988^{c g}
- Simulium laosense Takaoka, Srisuka & Saeung, 2017^{g}
- Simulium laoshanstum Ren, An & Kang, 1998^{c g}
- Simulium laplandica Chubareva & Yankovsky, 1992^{c g}
- Simulium lardizabalae Takaoka & Sofian-Azirun^{g}
- Simulium larvipilosum Okazawa, 1984^{c g}
- Simulium larvispinosum Leon, 1948^{c g}
- Simulium lassmanni Vergas, Martinez, 1946^{i c g}
- Simulium laterale Edwards, 1933^{c g}
- Simulium laticalx Enderlein, 1933^{i g}
- Simulium latidigitus Enderlein, 1936^{i g}
- Simulium latifile (Rubtsov, 1956)^{c g}
- Simulium latigonium (Rubtsov, 1956)^{c g}
- Simulium latilobus Rubtsov, 1973^{c g}
- Simulium latimentum (Rubtsov, 1956)^{c g}
- Simulium latipes Meigen, 1804^{i c g}
- Simulium latipollex (Enderlein, 1936)^{c g}
- Simulium latistylum Takaoka, 1983^{c g}
- Simulium latitarsus Rubtsov, 1971^{c g}
- Simulium laui Takaoka & Sofian-Azirun, 2015^{g}
- Simulium lawnhillense Colbo, 1976^{c g}
- Simulium laxum Takaoka, 2003^{c g}
- Simulium leberrei Grenier & Germain, 1966^{c g}
- Simulium ledangense ^{g}
- Simulium ledongense Yang & Chen, 2001^{c g}
- Simulium lehi Takaoka, 2001^{c g}
- Simulium leigongshanense Chen & Zhang, 1997^{c g}
- Simulium lemborense Takaoka & Sofian-Azirun^{g}
- Simulium leonense Boakye, Post & Mosha, 1993^{c g}
- Simulium leopoldense Strieder & Py-Daniel, 2000^{c g}
- Simulium lepnevae (Rubtsov, 1956)^{c g}
- Simulium letabum Meillon, 1935^{c g}
- Simulium letrasense Diaz Najera, 1969^{c g}
- Simulium lewisi Perez, 1971^{i c g}
- Simulium leytense Takaoka, 1983^{c g}
- Simulium liberiense Garms, 1973^{c g}
- Simulium lidiae (Semushin & Usova, 1983)^{c g}
- Simulium lididae Semushin & Usova, 1983^{c g}
- Simulium lilianae Takaoka, 2000^{c g}
- Simulium liliwense Takaoka, 1983^{c g}
- Simulium lilotense (Rubtsov, 1971)^{c g}
- Simulium limay Wygodzinsky, 1958^{c g}
- Simulium limbatum Knab, 1915^{i c g}
- Simulium linduense Takaoka, 2003^{c g}
- Simulium lineatum (Meigen, 1804)^{c g}
- Simulium lineothorax Puri, 1932^{c g}
- Simulium lingziense Deng, Zhang & Chen, 1995^{c g}
- Simulium liriense Rivosecchi, 1961^{c g}
- Simulium litobranchium Hamada, Pepinelli, Mattos-Gloria & Luz^{g}
- Simulium litoreum Datta, 1975^{c g}
- Simulium litshkense (Rubtsov, 1956)^{c g}
- Simulium littopyga Evenhuis, 2017^{g}
- Simulium littosocius Evenhuis, 2017^{g}
- Simulium littosodalis Evenhuis, 2017^{g}
- Simulium lividum (Schellenberg, 1803)^{c g}
- Simulium llutense Coscaron & Matta, 1982^{c g}
- Simulium lobatoi Dias, Hernandez, Maia-Herzog & Shelley, 2004^{c g}
- Simulium loeiense Takaoka, Srisuka & Fukuda, 2020^{g}
- Simulium loerchae Adler, 1987^{c g}
- Simulium lonchatum Chen, Zhang & Huang, 2005^{c g}
- Simulium lonckei Craig, 1997^{c g}
- Simulium longifiliatum (Rubtsov, 1976)^{c g}
- Simulium longipalpe Beltyukova, 1955^{c g}
- Simulium longipes (Rubtsov, 1956)^{c g}
- Simulium longirostre Smart, 1972^{c g}
- Simulium longistylatum Shewell, 1959^{i c g}
- Simulium longitarse (Rubtsov & Violovich, 1965)^{c g}
- Simulium longithallum Diaz Najera & Vulcano, 1962^{c g}
- Simulium longitruncum Zhang & Chen, 2003^{c g}
- Simulium longlanhense Takaoka^{g}
- Simulium longshengense Chen, Zhang & Zhang, 2007^{c g}
- Simulium longtanstum Ren Bing, An & Kang, 1998^{c g}
- Simulium lorense Takaoka, 2003^{c g}
- Simulium lotii Craig, 1987^{c g}
- Simulium lourencoi Py-Daniel, 1988^{c g}
- Simulium loutetense Grenier & Ovazza, 1951^{c g}
- Simulium loveridgei Crosskey, 1965^{c g}
- Simulium lowi Takaoka & Adler, 2017^{g}
- Simulium luadiense Elsen, Fain & Boeck, 1983^{c g}
- Simulium luchoi Coscaron & Wygodzinsky, 1972^{c g}
- Simulium lucyae Craig, 2006^{c g}
- Simulium ludingens Chen, Zhang & Huang, 2005^{c g}
- Simulium lugense Yankovsky, 1996^{c g}
- Simulium luggeri Nicholson and Mickel, 1950^{i c g}
- Simulium luliangense Chen & Lian^{g}
- Simulium lumbwanum Meillon, 1944^{c g}
- Simulium lundstromi (Enderlein, 1921)^{c g}
- Simulium lunduense Takaoka, 2008^{c g}
- Simulium luppovae (Rubtsov, 1956)^{c g}
- Simulium luridum Takaoka, 2003^{c g}
- Simulium lurybayae Smart, 1944^{i c g}
- Simulium lushanense Chen, Kang & Zhang, 2007^{c g}
- Simulium lutzi Knab, 1913^{c g}
- Simulium lutzianum Pinto, 1931^{i c g}
- Simulium luzonicum Takaoka, 1983^{c g}

=== M ===
- Simulium macca (Enderlein, 1934)^{c g}
- Simulium machadoallisoni Vulcano, 1981^{i}
- Simulium machadoi Luna de Carvalho, 1962^{c g}
- Simulium machetorum ^{g}
- Simulium mackerrasorum Colbo, 1976^{c g}
- Simulium maculatum (Meigen, 1804)^{c g}
- Simulium maehongsonense Takaoka, Srisuka & Saeung, 2020^{g}
- Simulium maelanoiense Takaoka, Srisuka & Saeung, 2020^{g}
- Simulium maenoi Takaoka & Choochote, 2002^{c g}
- Simulium maertensi Elsen, Fain & de Boeck, 1983^{c g}
- Simulium maewongense Takaoka, Srisuka & Saeung, 2020^{g}
- Simulium mafuluense Smart & Clifford, 1965^{c g}
- Simulium magnum Lane & Porto, 1940^{c g}
- Simulium mainitense Takaoka, Tenedero, 2019^{g}
- Simulium major Lane and Porto, 1940^{i g}
- Simulium makartshenkovi Bodrova, 1987^{c g}
- Simulium makilingense Takaoka, 1983^{c g}
- Simulium maklarini Takaoka, 2007^{c g}
- Simulium malaibaense Takaoka & Tenedero, 2007^{c g}
- Simulium malardei Craig, 1987^{c g}
- Simulium malayense Takaoka & Davies, 1995^{g}
- Simulium malinoense Takaoka, 2003^{c g}
- Simulium malukuense Takaoka, 2003^{c g}
- Simulium malyschevi Dorog., Rubtsov, and Vlasenko, 1935^{i c g}
- Simulium mamasaense Takaoka, 2003^{c g}
- Simulium manadoense Takaoka, 2003^{c g}
- Simulium manbucalense Takaoka, 1983^{c g}
- Simulium manense Elsen & Escaffre, 1976^{c g}
- Simulium mangabeirai Vargas, 1945^{c g}
- Simulium mangasepi Takaoka, 1983^{c g}
- Simulium manicatum Enderlein, 1933^{i g}
- Simulium manokwariense Takaoka, 2003^{c g}
- Simulium manooni Takaoka & Choochote, 2005^{c g}
- Simulium manuselaense Takaoka, 2003^{c g}
- Simulium maraaense Craig, 1997^{c g}
- Simulium maranguapense Pessoa, Rios-Velasquez & Py-Daniel, 2005^{c g}
- Simulium marathrumi Fairchild, 1940^{c g}
- Simulium margaritae (Rubtsov, 1956)^{c g}
- Simulium margaritatum Pepinelli, Hamada & Luz, 2006^{c g}
- Simulium mariavulcanoae Coscaron & Wygodzinsky, 1984^{c g}
- Simulium maritimum (Rubtsov, 1956)^{c g}
- Simulium marlieri Grenier, 1950^{c g}
- Simulium marocanum Bouzidi & Giudicelli, 1988^{c g}
- Simulium maroniense Floch and Abonnenc, 1946^{i g}
- Simulium marosense Takaoka, Sofian-Azirun & Suana, 2019^{g}
- Simulium marquezi Vargas & Diaz Najera, 1957^{c g}
- Simulium marsicanum (Rivosecchi, 1962)^{c g}
- Simulium masabae Gibbins, 1934^{c g}
- Simulium masilauense Takaoka, 2008^{c g}
- Simulium mataverense Craig & Craig, 1987^{c g}
- Simulium matokoense Smart & Clifford, 1965^{c g}
- Simulium matteabranchia Anduze, 1947^{i}
- Simulium matteabranchium Anduze, 1947^{c g}
- Simulium mauense Nunes de Mello, 1974^{c g}
- Simulium maximum (Knoz, 1961)^{c g}
- Simulium mayuchuspi Coscaron, 1990^{c g}
- Simulium mayumbense Fain & Elsen, 1973^{c g}
- Simulium mazzottii Diaz Najera, 1981^{c g}
- Simulium mbarigui Coscaron and Wygodzinsky, 1973^{i}
- Simulium mcmahoni Meillon, 1940^{c g}
- Simulium meadowi Mahe, Ma & An, 2003^{c g}
- Simulium mediaxisus An, Guo & Xu, 1995^{c g}
- Simulium mediocoloratum Takaoka, 2006^{c g}
- Simulium mediodentatum Takaoka, 2003^{c g}
- Simulium mediovittatum Knab, 1916^{i c g}
- Simulium medusaeforme Pomeroy, 1920^{c g}
- Simulium meigeni (Rubtsov & Carlsson, 1965)^{c g}
- Simulium melanocephalum Gouteux, 1978^{c g}
- Simulium melanopus Edwards, 1929^{c g}
- Simulium melatum Wharton, 1949^{c g}
- Simulium mellah Giudicelli, Bouzidi & Ait Abdelaali, 2000^{c g}
- Simulium menchacai Vargas & Najera, 1957^{c g}
- Simulium mendiense Smart & Clifford, 1965^{c g}
- Simulium mengense Vajime & Dunbar, 1979^{c g}
- Simulium mengi Chen, Zhang & Wen, 2000^{c g}
- Simulium menglaense Chen, 2003^{c g}
- Simulium merga Takaoka & Choochote, 2005^{c g}
- Simulium meridionale Riley, 1887^{i c g}
- Simulium merops Meillon, 1950^{c g}
- Simulium merritti Adler, Currie & Wood, 2004^{c g}
- Simulium meruoca Mello, Almeida, Dellome, 1973^{i}
- Simulium mesasiaticum Rubtsov, 1947^{c g}
- Simulium mesodontium Craig, 1987^{c g}
- Simulium metallicum Bellardi, 1859^{i c g}
- Simulium metatrsale Brunetti, 1911^{c g}
- Simulium metecontae Elouard & Pilaka, 1996^{c g}
- Simulium mexicanum Bellardi, 1862^{i}
- Simulium meyerae Moulton & Adler, 2002^{c g}
- Simulium miblosi Takaoka, 1983^{c g}
- Simulium microbranchium Dalmat, 1949^{c g}
- Simulium microlepidum Elsen, Fain & de Boeck, 1983^{c g}
- Simulium middlemissae Craig, 1997^{c g}
- Simulium mie Ogata & Sasa, 1954^{c g}
- Simulium milloti Grenier & Doucet, 1949^{c g}
- Simulium minahasaense Takaoka, 2003^{c g}
- Simulium minangkabaum Takaoka & Sigit, 1997^{c g}
- Simulium mindanaoense Takaoka, 1983^{c g}
- Simulium mindoroense Takaoka & Tenedero, 2007^{c g}
- Simulium minji Smart & Clifford, 1965^{c g}
- Simulium minuanum Strieder & Coscaron, 2000^{c g}
- Simulium minus (Dyar and Shannon, 1927)^{i c g}
- Simulium minusculum Lutz^{i c g}
- Simulium minuticorpus (Yankovsky, 1996)^{c g}
- Simulium minutum (Rubtsov, 1959)^{c}
- Simulium miyagii Takaoka, 2003^{c g}
- Simulium modicum Adler, Currie & Wood, 2004^{c g}
- Simulium mogii Takaoka, 2003^{c g}
- Simulium molliculum Takaoka, 2003^{c g}
- Simulium mongolense Yankovsky, 1996^{c g}
- Simulium mongolicum (Rubtsov, 1969)^{c g}
- Simulium montiblense Takaoka, 1983^{c g}
- Simulium monticola Friederichs, 1920^{c g}
- Simulium monticoloides (Rubtsov, 1956)^{c g}
- Simulium montium (Rubtsov, 1947)^{c g}
- Simulium montshadskii (Rubtsov, 1956)^{c g}
- Simulium morae Perez, Rassi, Ramirez, 1977^{i c g}
- Simulium morisonoi Takaoka, 1973^{c g}
- Simulium morsitans Edwards, 1915^{c g}
- Simulium motoyukii Takaoka, 2003^{c g}
- Simulium moucheti Gouteux, 1977^{c g}
- Simulium moultoni Adler, Currie & Wood, 2004^{c g}
- Simulium moxiense Chen, Huang & Zhang, 2005^{c g}
- Simulium muangpanense Takaoka, Srisuka & Fukuda, 2020^{g}
- Simulium multiclavulatum Fain, Elsen & Dujardin, 1989^{c g}
- Simulium multidentatum Bodrova, 1988^{c g}
- Simulium multifurcatum Zhang, 1991^{c g}
- Simulium multistriatum Rubtsov, 1947^{c g}
- Simulium mumfordi Edwards, 1932^{c g}
- Simulium munumense Smart & Clifford, 1965^{c g}
- Simulium murvanidzei (Rubtsov, 1955)^{c g}
- Simulium mussauense Delfinado, 1971^{c g}
- Simulium mutucuna Mello and Silva, 1974^{i c g}
- Simulium myanmarense Takaoka, Srisuka & Saeung, 2017^{g}
- Simulium mysterium Adler, Currie & Wood, 2004^{c g}

=== N ===
- Simulium nacojapi Smart, 1944^{c g}
- Simulium nahimi Py-Daniel, 1984^{c g}
- Simulium nakhonense Takaoka & Suzuki, 1984^{c g}
- Simulium nakkhoense Takaoka & Suzuki, 1984^{c g}
- Simulium namdanense Takaoka, Srisuka & Saeung, 2020^{g}
- Simulium namense Takaoka, 1989^{c g}
- Simulium nami Smart & Clifford, 1965^{c g}
- Simulium nanoiense Takaoka, Srisuka & Saeung, 2020^{g}
- Simulium nanthaburiense Takaoka, Srisuka & Fukuda, 2020^{g}
- Simulium nanum Zetterstedt, 1838^{c g}
- Simulium napuense Takaoka, 2003^{c g}
- Simulium narcaeum Meillon, 1950^{c g}
- Simulium natalense Meillon, 1950^{c g}
- Simulium naturale Davies, 1966^{c g}
- Simulium neavei Roubaud, 1915^{c g}
- Simulium nebulicola Edwards, 1934^{c g}
- Simulium nebulosum Currie and Adler, 1986^{i c g}
- Simulium negativum Adler, Currie & Wood, 2004^{c g}
- Simulium neireti Roubaud, 1905^{c g}
- Simulium nemorale Edwards, 1931^{c g}
- Simulium nemorivagum Datta, 1973^{c g}
- Simulium nemuroense Takaoka & Saito, 2002^{c g}
- Simulium neornatipes Dumbleton, 1969^{c g}
- Simulium neoviceps Craig, 1987^{c g}
- Simulium nepalense Lewis, 1964^{c g}
- Simulium netteli Diaz Najera, 1969^{c g}
- Simulium ngabogei Fain, 1950^{c g}
- Simulium nganganum Elsen, Fain & de Boeck, 1983^{c g}
- Simulium ngaoense Takaoka, Srisuka & Saeung, 2018^{g}
- Simulium ngouense Fain & Elsen, 1973^{c g}
- Simulium nicholsoni Mackerras & Mackerras, 1948^{c g}
- Simulium nigricorne Dalmat, 1950^{c g}
- Simulium nigricoxum Stone, 1050^{i c g}
- Simulium nigrifacies Datta, 1974^{c g}
- Simulium nigrifemur (Enderlein, 1936)^{c g}
- Simulium nigrimanum Macquart, 1838^{c g}
- Simulium nigripilosum Edwards, 1933^{c g}
- Simulium nigristrigatum (Enderlein, 1930)^{c g}
- Simulium nigritarse Coquillett, 1902^{c g}
- Simulium nigrofemoralum Chen & Zhang, 2001^{c g}
- Simulium nigrofilum Takaoka & Sofian-Azirun^{g}
- Simulium nigrofusipes Rubtsov, 1947^{c g}
- Simulium nigrogilvum Summers, 1911^{c g}
- Simulium nigrum (Meigen, 1804)^{c g}
- Simulium niha Giuducelli & Dia, 1986^{c g}
- Simulium nikkoense Shiraki, 1935^{c g}
- Simulium nilesi Rambajan, 1979^{c g}
- Simulium nilgiricum Puri, 1932^{c g}
- Simulium nili Gibbins, 1934^{c g}
- Simulium nishijimai (Ono, 1978)^{c g}
- Simulium nitidithorax Puri, 1932^{c g}
- Simulium nobile Meijere, 1907^{c g}
- Simulium nodosum Puri, 1933^{c g}
- Simulium noelleri Friederichs, 1920^{c g}
- Simulium nogueirai D'andretta and Gonzalez, 1964^{i}
- Simulium noguerai d'Andretta & Gonzalez, 1964^{c g}
- Simulium norfolkense Dumbleton, 1969^{c g}
- Simulium norforense Takaoka, 2003^{c g}
- Simulium noroense Takaoka & Suzuki, 1995^{c g}
- Simulium notatum Adams, 1904^{i c g}
- Simulium notiale Stone and Snoddy, 1969^{i c g}
- Simulium novemarticulatum Takaoka & Davies, 1995^{g}
- Simulium novigracilis Deng, Zhang & Xue, 1996^{c g}
- Simulium novolineatum Puri, 1933^{c g}
- Simulium nubis Davies & Gyorkos, 1987^{c g}
- Simulium nudifrons Takaoka, 2003^{c g}
- Simulium nudipes Takaoka, 2003^{c g}
- Simulium nujiangense Xue, 1993^{c g}
- Simulium nunesdemelloi Hamada, Pepinelli & Hernandez, 2006^{c g}
- Simulium nunestovari Perez, Rassi, and Ramirez, 1977^{i g}
- Simulium nuneztovari Perez, Rassi & Ramirez, 1977^{c g}
- Simulium nyaense Gouteux, 1977^{c g}
- Simulium nyanzense Fain & Dujardin, 1983^{c g}
- Simulium nyasalandicum Meillon, 1930^{c g}
- Simulium nyssa Stone and Snoddy, 1969^{i c g}

=== O ===
- Simulium obesum Vulcano, 1959^{i c g}
- Simulium obichingoum Chubareva, 2000^{c g}
- Simulium obikumbense (Rubtsov, 1972)^{c g}
- Simulium oblongum Takaoka & Choochote, 2005^{c g}
- Simulium ochoai Vargas, Palacios & Najera, 1946^{c g}
- Simulium ochraceum Walker, 1861^{i c g}
- Simulium ochreacum Walker, 1861^{g}
- Simulium ochrescentipes Enderlein, 1921^{c g}
- Simulium ocreastylum (Rubtsov, 1956)^{c g}
- Simulium octofiliatum (Rubtsov, 1956)^{c g}
- Simulium octospicae Gibbins, 1937^{c g}
- Simulium oculatum (Enderlein, 1936)^{c g}
- Simulium odontostylum Rubtsov, 1947^{c g}
- Simulium ogatai (Rubtsov, 1962)^{c g}
- Simulium ogonukii Takaoka, 1983^{c g}
- Simulium oguamai Lewis & Disney, 1972^{c g}
- Simulium oitanum (Shiraki, 1935)^{c g}
- Simulium okinawaense Takaoka, 1976^{c g}
- Simulium oligotuberculatum (Knoz, 1965)^{c g}
- Simulium olimpicum Diaz Najera, 1969^{c g}
- Simulium olonicum (Usova, 1961)^{c g}
- Simulium omorii (Takahasi, 1942)^{c g}
- Simulium omutaense Ogata & Sasa, 1954^{c g}
- Simulium onoi Yankovsky, 1996^{c g}
- Simulium onum Bodrova, 1988^{c g}
- Simulium opalinifrons Enderlein, 1934^{i g}
- Simulium opunohuense Craig, 1987^{c g}
- Simulium orbitale Lutz, 1910^{i c g}
- Simulium oresti Vorobets, 1984^{c g}
- Simulium ornatipes Skuse, 1890^{c g}
- Simulium ornatum (Meigen, 1818)^{c g}
- Simulium orsovae Smart, 1944^{c g}
- Simulium ortizi Perez, 1971^{i g}
- Simulium oshimaense Ono, 1989^{c g}
- Simulium oshimanum Shiraki, 1935^{c g}
- Simulium ovazzae Grenier & Mouchet, 1959^{c g}
- Simulium oviceps Edwards, 1933^{c g}
- Simulium oviedoi Perez, 1971^{i c g}
- Simulium oyapockense Floch and Abonnenc, 1946^{i c g}
- Simulium ozarkense Moulton & Adler, 1995^{c g}

=== P ===
- Simulium padangense Takaoka & Sigit, 1997^{c g}
- Simulium pahangense Takaoka & Davies, 1995^{c g}
- Simulium palauense Stone, 1964^{c g}
- Simulium palawanense Delfinado, 1971^{c g}
- Simulium pallidicranium Craig & Joy, 2000^{c g}
- Simulium pallidofemur Deng, Zhang & Xue, 1994^{c g}
- Simulium pallidum Puri, 1932^{c g}
- Simulium palmatum Puri, 1932^{c g}
- Simulium palmeri Pomeroy, 1922^{c g}
- Simulium palniense Puri, 1933^{c g}
- Simulium palopoense Takaoka, 2003^{c g}
- Simulium palustre Rubtsov, 1956^{c g}
- Simulium pamahaense Takaoka, 2003^{c g}
- Simulium panamense Fairchild, 1940^{c g}
- Simulium pandanophilum Kruger, Nurmi & Garms, 1998^{c g}
- Simulium pangunaense Takaoka, 1995^{c g}
- Simulium pankumuense Craig, 2006^{c g}
- Simulium papaveroi Coscaron, 1982^{c g}
- Simulium papuense Wharton, 1948^{c g}
- Simulium paracarolinae Coscaron, 2004^{c g}
- Simulium paracorniferum (Yankovsky, 1979)^{c g}
- Simulium paradisium Craig, 2006^{c g}
- Simulium paraequinum Puri, 1933^{c g}
- Simulium paraguayense Schrottky, 1909^{i c g}
- Simulium parahiyangum Takaoka & Sigit, 1992^{c g}
- Simulium paralongipalpe Worobez, 1987^{c g}
- Simulium paraloutetense Crosskey, 1988^{c g}
- Simulium paramorsitans Rubtsov, 1956^{c g}
- Simulium paranense Schrottky, 1909^{i c g}
- Simulium paranubis Davies & Gyorkos, 1992^{c g}
- Simulium parapusillum (Rubtsov, 1956)^{c g}
- Simulium parargyreatum Rubtsov, 1979^{c g}
- Simulium parawaterfallum Zhang, Yang & Chen, 2003^{c g}
- Simulium parimaensis Perez, Yarzabal & Takaoka, 1986^{c g}
- Simulium parmatum Adler, Currie & Wood, 2004^{c g}
- Simulium parnassum Malloch, 1914^{i c g}
- Simulium parrai Vargas & Palacios, 1946^{c g}
- Simulium parvulum Takaoka, 2003^{c g}
- Simulium parvum Enderlein, 1921^{c g}
- Simulium pathrushevae (Boldarueva, 1979)^{c g}
- Simulium patrushevae (Ivashchenko, 1978)^{c}
- Simulium pattoni Senior-White, 1922^{c g}
- Simulium patzicianense Takaoka & Takahasi, 1982^{c g}
- Simulium paucicuspis (Rubtsov, 1947)^{c g}
- Simulium pauliani Grenier & Doucet, 1949^{c g}
- Simulium pautense Coscaron & Takaoka, 1989^{c g}
- Simulium pavlovskii Rubtsov, 1940^{c g}
- Simulium paynei Vargas, 1942^{i c g}
- Simulium pegalanense Smart & Clifford, 1969^{c g}
- Simulium peggyae Takaoka, 1995^{c g}
- Simulium pekingense Sun, 1999^{c g}
- Simulium penai Wygodzinsky & Coscaron, 1970^{c g}
- Simulium penobscotensis Snoddy and Bauer, 1978^{i c g}
- Simulium pentaceros Grenier & Brunhes, 1972^{c g}
- Simulium perakense Takaoka, Ya'cob & Sofian-Azirun, 2018^{g}
- Simulium peregrinum Mackerras & Mackerras, 1950^{c g}
- Simulium perflavum Roubaud, 1906^{i c g}
- Simulium perforatum Fain & Dujardin, 1983^{c g}
- Simulium perlucidulum Takaoka, 1983^{c g}
- Simulium perplexum Shelley, Maia-Herzog & Luna Dias, 1989^{c g}
- Simulium pertinax Kollar, 1832^{i c g}
- Simulium peskovi Ismagulov & Koshkimbaev, 1996^{c g}
- Simulium peteri Anbalagan^{g}
- Simulium petersoni Stone and Defoliart, 1959^{i c g}
- Simulium petricolum (Rivosecchi, 1963)^{g}
- Simulium petropoliense Coscaron, 1981^{c g}
- Simulium phami Takaoka & Sofian-Azirun^{g}
- Simulium phapeungense Takaoka, Srisuka & Fukuda, 2020^{g}
- Simulium phayaoense Takaoka & Choochote, 2005^{c g}
- Simulium philippianum Pinto, 1932^{c g}
- Simulium philippii Coscaron, 1976^{c g}
- Simulium philipponi Elouard & Pilaka, 1997^{c g}
- Simulium phluktainae Pilaka & Elouard, 1999^{c g}
- Simulium phraense Takaoka, Srisuka & Saeung, 2018^{g}
- Simulium phulocense Takaoka & Chen, 2015^{g}
- Simulium phurueaense Tangkawanit, Wongpakam & Pramual, 2018^{g}
- Simulium pichi Wygodzinsky & Coscaron, 1967^{c g}
- Simulium pichoni Craig, Fossati & Sechan, 1995^{c g}
- Simulium pictipes Hagen, 1880^{i c g}
- Simulium pifanoi Perez, 1971^{i c g}
- Simulium pilosum (Knowlton and Rowe, 1934)^{i c g}
- Simulium pindiensis Khatoon & Hasan, 1996^{c g}
- Simulium pingtungense Huang & Takaoka, 2008^{g}
- Simulium pinhaoi Santos Gracio, 1985^{g}
- Simulium pintoi D'andretta and D'andretta, 1946^{i c g}
- Simulium piperi Dyar and Shannon, 1927^{i c g}
- Simulium piscicidium Riley, 1870^{c g}
- Simulium pitasawatae Takaoka, Srisuka & Saeung, 2020^{g}
- Simulium pitense Carlsson, 1962^{c g}
- Simulium planipuparium Rubtsov, 1947^{c g}
- Simulium platytarse (Yankovsky, 1977)^{c g}
- Simulium plumbeum Krueger, 2006^{c g}
- Simulium podostemi Snoddy, 1971^{i c g}
- Simulium pohaense Takaoka & Suzuki, 1995^{c g}
- Simulium polare Rubtsov, 1940^{c g}
- Simulium politum Crosskey, 1977^{c g}
- Simulium polyprominulum Chen & Lian^{g}
- Simulium pontinum Rivosecchi, 1960^{c g}
- Simulium popowae Rubtsov, 1940^{c g}
- Simulium posticatum (Meigen, 1838)^{c g}
- Simulium praelargum Datta, 1973^{c g}
- Simulium prafiense Takaoka, 2003^{c g}
- Simulium prayongi Takaoka & Choochote, 2005^{c g}
- Simulium proctorae Craig, 1997^{c g}
- Simulium prodexargenteum (Enderlein, 1936)^{i c g}
- Simulium prominentum Chen & Zhang, 2002^{c g}
- Simulium promorsitans Rubtsov, 1956^{c g}
- Simulium pruinosum Lutz, 1910^{i}
- Simulium prumirimense Corcaron, 1981^{c g}
- Simulium pseudequinum Seguy, 1921^{c g}
- Simulium pseudoamazonicum Perez & Peterson, 1981^{c g}
- Simulium pseudoantillarum Ramirez-Perez & Vulcano, 1973^{c g}
- Simulium pseudocallidum Diaz Najera, 1965^{c g}
- Simulium pseudocorium Craig & Joy, 2000^{c g}
- Simulium pseudoexiguum Mello and Almeida, 1974^{i c g}
- Simulium pseudonearcticum Rubtsov, 1940^{c g}
- Simulium pseudopusillum (Rubtsov, 1956)^{c g}
- Simulium puaense Takaoka, Srisuka & Saeung, 2020^{g}
- Simulium pufauense Craig, 1997^{c g}
- Simulium pugetense (Dyar and Shannon, 1927)^{i c g}
- Simulium puigi Vargas & Palacios, 1945^{c g}
- Simulium pukaengense Takaoka & Choochote, 2005^{c g}
- Simulium pulanotum An, Guo & Xu, 1995^{c g}
- Simulium pulchripes Austen, 1925^{c g}
- Simulium pulchrum Philippi, 1865^{c g}
- Simulium puliense Takaoka, 1979^{c g}
- Simulium pullus Rubtsov, 1956^{c g}
- Simulium pulverulentum Knab, 1914^{i c g}
- Simulium purii Datta, 1973^{c g}
- Simulium purosae Smart & Clifford, 1965^{c g}
- Simulium pusillum Fries, 1824^{c g}
- Simulium putre Coscaron & Matta, 1982^{c g}

=== Q ===
- Simulium qianense Chen & Chen, 2001^{c g}
- Simulium qiaolaoense Chen, 2001^{c g}
- Simulium qinghaiense Liu, Gong, Zhang, Luo & An, 2003^{c g}
- Simulium qingshuiense Chen, 2001^{c g}
- Simulium qingxilingense Cai & An, 2005^{c g}
- Simulium qini Cao, Wang & Chen, 1993^{c g}
- Simulium qiongzhouense Chen, Zhang & Yang, 2003^{c g}
- Simulium quadratum (Stains & Knowlton, 1943)^{c g}
- Simulium quadrifidum Lutz, 1917^{i c g}
- Simulium quadrifila (Grenier, Faure & Laurent, 1957)^{c g}
- Simulium quadristrigatum Enderlein, 1933^{i c g}
- Simulium quadrivittatum Loew^{i c g}
- Simulium quasidecolletum Crosskey, 1988^{c g}
- Simulium quasifrenum Delfinado, 1971^{c g}
- Simulium quattuordecimfiliatum (Rubtsov, 1976)^{c g}
- Simulium quatturodecimfilum Rubtsov, 1947^{c g}
- Simulium quebecense Twinn, 1936^{i c g}
- Simulium quechuanum Coscaron & Wygodzinsky, 1972^{c g}
- Simulium quilleverei Pilaka & Elouard, 1999^{c g}
- Simulium quimbayium ^{g}
- Simulium quinquefiliatum Takaoka, 2003^{c g}
- Simulium quinquestriatum (Shiraki, 1935)^{c g}
- Simulium quychauense Takaoka & Chen^{g}

=== R ===
- Simulium racenisi Perez, 1971^{i c g}
- Simulium raivavaense Craig & Porch^{g}
- Simulium ramosum Puri, 1932^{c g}
- Simulium ramulosum Chen, 2000^{c g}
- Simulium ranauense Takaoka, 2006^{c g}
- Simulium rangeli Perez, 1977^{i c g}
- Simulium rangiferinum (Rubtsov, 1956)^{c g}
- Simulium ransikiense Takaoka, 2003^{c g}
- Simulium raohense Cai & Yao, 2006^{c g}
- Simulium rappae Py-Daniel & Coscaron, 1982^{c g}
- Simulium rashidi Lewis, 1973^{c g}
- Simulium rasyani Garms, Kerner & Meredith, 1988^{c g}
- Simulium raunsimnae Smart & Clifford, 1965^{c g}
- Simulium raybouldi Fain & Dujardin, 1983^{c g}
- Simulium rayohense Smart & Clifford, 1969^{c g}
- Simulium rebunense (Ono, 1979)^{c g}
- Simulium recurvum Takaoka, 1983^{c g}
- Simulium reginae Terteryan, 1949^{c g}
- Simulium remissum Moulton & Adler, 1995^{c g}
- Simulium remotum Rubtsov, 1956^{c g}
- Simulium rendalense (Golini, 1975)^{c g}
- Simulium repertum Elsen, Fain & de Boeck, 1983^{c g}
- Simulium reptans (Linnaeus, 1758)^{c g}
- Simulium resimum Takaoka, 1983^{c g}
- Simulium retusum Delfinado, 1971^{c g}
- Simulium rezvoi Rubtsov, 1956^{c g}
- Simulium rheophilum Tan & Chow, 1976^{c g}
- Simulium rhodesinese Meillon, 1942^{c g}
- Simulium rhopaloides Craig, Englund & Takaoka, 2006^{c g}
- Simulium rickenbachi Germain & Mouchet, 1966^{c g}
- Simulium riograndense Py-Daniel, Souza & Caldas, 1988^{c g}
- Simulium rithrogenophila Konurbayev, 1984^{c}
- Simulium rithrogenophilum Konurbayev, 1984^{c g}
- Simulium rivasi Perez, 1971^{i c g}
- Simulium riverai Takaoka, 1983^{c g}
- Simulium rivi (Ivashchenko, 1970)^{g}
- Simulium rivierei Craig, Fossati & Sechan, 1995^{c g}
- Simulium rivosecchii (Contini, 1965)^{c g}
- Simulium rivuli Twinn, 1936^{i g}
- Simulium robynae Peterson, 1993^{c g}
- Simulium rodhaini Fain, 1950^{c g}
- Simulium romanai Wygodzinsky, 1951^{c g}
- Simulium roquemayu Coscaron, 1985^{c g}
- Simulium roraimense Nunes de Mello, 1974^{c g}
- Simulium rorotaense Floch and Abonnenc, 1946^{i c g}
- Simulium rosemaryae Takaoka & Roberts, 1988^{c g}
- Simulium rothfelsi Adler, Brockhouse & Currie, 2003^{c g}
- Simulium rotifilis Chen & Zhang, 1998^{c g}
- Simulium rotundatum (Rubtsov, 1956)^{c g}
- Simulium rotundum Gibbins, 1936^{c g}
- Simulium rounae Smart & Clifford, 1965^{c g}
- Simulium ruandae Fain, 1950^{c g}
- Simulium rubescens Fain & Dujardin, 1983^{c g}
- Simulium rubicundulum Knab, 1915^{c g}
- Simulium rubiginosum Enderlein, 1933^{i c g}
- Simulium rubrithorax Lutz, 1909^{i c g}
- Simulium rubroflavifemur Rubtsov, 1940^{c g}
- Simulium rubtzovi Smart, 1945^{i c g}
- Simulium rubzovianum Sherban, 1961^{g}
- Simulium rubzovium (Ivashchenko, 1978)^{c g}
- Simulium rufibasis Brunetti, 1911^{c g}
- Simulium ruficorne Macquart, 1838^{c g}
- Simulium rufithorax Brunetti, 1911^{c g}
- Simulium rugglesi Nicholson and Mickel, 1950^{i c g}
- Simulium ruizi Vargas & Najera, 1948^{c g}
- Simulium rurutuense Craig, 1997^{c g}
- Simulium rutherfoordi Meillon, 1937^{c g}

=== S ===
- Simulium sabahense Smart & Clifford, 1969^{c g}
- Simulium saccai (Rivosecchi, 1967)^{c g}
- Simulium saccatum (Rubtsov, 1956)^{c g}
- Simulium sacculiferum Fain & Dujardin, 1983^{c g}
- Simulium saeungae Takaoka & Srisuka, 2018^{g}
- Simulium saihoense Smart & Clifford, 1965^{c g}
- Simulium sakhalinum (Rubtsov, 1962)^{c g}
- Simulium sakishimaense Takaoka, 1977^{c g}
- Simulium salazarae Takaoka, 1983^{c g}
- Simulium salebrosum Takaoka, 1983^{c g}
- Simulium saliceti (Rubtsov, 1971)^{c g}
- Simulium salinum (Rubtsov, 1956)^{c g}
- Simulium samarkandica Yankovsky, 2000^{c g}
- Simulium samboni Jennings, 1915^{i c g}
- Simulium sanctipauli Vajime & Dunbar, 1975^{c g}
- Simulium sandyi Coscaron, Ibanez-Bernal & Coscaron-Arias, 1999^{c g}
- Simulium sangrense (Rivosecchi, 1967)^{c g}
- Simulium sanguineum Knab, 1915^{i c g}
- Simulium sansahoense Takaoka & Chen^{g}
- Simulium santomi Mustapha, 2004^{c g}
- Simulium saradzhoense (Rubtsov, 1956)^{c g}
- Simulium sarawakense Takaoka, 2001^{c g}
- Simulium sasai (Rubstov, 1962)^{c g}
- Simulium sastscheri Machavariani, 1966^{c g}
- Simulium satsumense Takaoka, 1976^{c g}
- Simulium savici (Baranov, 1937)^{c g}
- Simulium saxosum Adler, Currie & Wood, 2004^{c g}
- Simulium sazalyi Takaoka, Ya'cob & Low, 2018^{g}
- Simulium schamili (Rubtsov, 1964)^{c g}
- Simulium schevyakovi Dorogostaisky & Rubtsov, 1935^{c g}
- Simulium schizolomum Deng, Zhang & Chen, 1995^{c g}
- Simulium schizostylum Chen & Zhang^{g}
- Simulium schmidtmummi Wygodzinsky, 1973^{i c g}
- Simulium schoenemanni Enderlein, 1934^{c g}
- Simulium schoutedeni Wanson, 1947^{c g}
- Simulium schwetzi Wanson, 1947^{c g}
- Simulium scutellatum (Lane & Porto, 1940)^{c g}
- Simulium scutistriatum Lutz, 1909^{i c g}
- Simulium sechani Craig & Fossati, 1995^{c g}
- Simulium segusina (Couvert, 1968)^{c g}
- Simulium selewynense Takaoka & Suzuki, 1995^{c g}
- Simulium selwynense Takaoka & Suzuki, 1995^{c g}
- Simulium semushini Usova & Zinchenko, 1992^{c g}
- Simulium senile Brunetti, 1911^{c g}
- Simulium septentrionale (Tan & Chow, 1976)^{c g}
- Simulium seramense Takaoka, 2003^{c g}
- Simulium serenum Huang & Takaoka, 2009^{g}
- Simulium sergenti Edwards, 1923^{c g}
- Simulium seriatum Knab, 1914^{i}
- Simulium serranus Coscaron, 1981^{c g}
- Simulium serratum Takaoka, 2003^{c g}
- Simulium setsukoae Takaoka & Choochote, 2004^{c g}
- Simulium sexafile (Rubtsov, 1976)^{c g}
- Simulium sexiens Meillon, 1944^{c g}
- Simulium shadini (Rubtsov, 1956)^{c g}
- Simulium shandongense Sun & Li, 2000^{c g}
- Simulium shangchuanense An & Hao, 1998^{c g}
- Simulium shannonae Craig, 1997^{c g}
- Simulium shanxiense Cai, An, Li & Yan, 2004^{c g}
- Simulium sheilae Takaoka & Davies, 1995^{g}
- Simulium shennongjiaense Yang, Luo & Chen, 2005^{c g}
- Simulium sherwoodi Stone & Maffi, 1971^{c g}
- Simulium sheveligiense (Rubtsov & Violovich, 1965)^{c g}
- Simulium shevtshenkovae Rubtsov, 1965^{c g}
- Simulium shewellianum Coscaron, 1985^{c g}
- Simulium shiraki Kono & Takahasi, 1940^{c g}
- Simulium shoae Grenier & Ovazza, 1956^{c g}
- Simulium shogakii (Rubtsov, 1962)^{c g}
- Simulium siamense Takaoka & Suzuki, 1984^{c g}
- Simulium sicuani Smart, 1944^{i c g}
- Simulium silvaticum (Rubtsov, 1962)^{c g}
- Simulium silvestre (Rubtsov, 1956)^{c g}
- Simulium simianshanensis Wang, Li & Sun, 1996^{c g}
- Simulium simile Silva Figueroa, 1917^{c g}
- Simulium simplex Gibbins, 1936^{c g}
- Simulium simplicicolor Lutz, 1910^{i}
- Simulium simulacrum Delfinado, 1969^{c g}
- Simulium simulans Rubtsov, 1956^{c g}
- Simulium sinense (Enderlein, 1934)^{c g}
- Simulium singgihi Takaoka, 2003^{c g}
- Simulium singtamense Datta & Pal, 1975^{c g}
- Simulium siolii Py-Daniel, 1988^{c g}
- Simulium sirbanum Vajime & Dunbar, 1975^{c g}
- Simulium sirimonense Fain & Dujardin, 1983^{c g}
- Simulium slossonae Dyar and Shannon, 1927^{i c g}
- Simulium smarti Vargas, 1946^{c g}
- Simulium snowi Stone and Snoddy, 1969^{i c g}
- Simulium solarii Stone, 1948^{i c g}
- Simulium solomonense Takaoka & Suzuki, 1995^{c g}
- Simulium songense Takaoka, Srisuka & Fukuda, 2020^{g}
- Simulium sonkulense Yankovsky, 2000^{c g}
- Simulium sorongense Takaoka, 2003^{c g}
- Simulium soubrense Vajime & Dunbar, 1975^{c g}
- Simulium souzalopesi Coscaron, 1981^{c g}
- Simulium spadicidorsum (Enderlein, 1934)^{i}
- Simulium speculiventre Enderlein, 1914^{c g}
- Simulium spilmani Stone, 1969^{c g}
- Simulium spinibranchium Lutz, 1910^{i c g}
- Simulium spinifer Knab, 1914^{i c g}
- Simulium spinosibranchium Takaoka, 1983^{c g}
- Simulium spinulicorne Fain & Elsen, 1980^{c g}
- Simulium spiroi Craig, Currie & Hunter, 2006^{c g}
- Simulium splendidum Rubtsov, 1940^{c g}
- Simulium spoonatum An & Yan, 1998^{c g}
- Simulium squamosum (Enderlein, 1921)^{c g}
- Simulium srisukai Takaoka & Saeung, 2017^{g}
- Simulium stackelbergi (Rubtsov, 1956)^{c g}
- Simulium standfasti Colbo, 1976^{c g}
- Simulium starmuhlneri Grenier & Grjebine, 1964^{c g}
- Simulium steatopygium Craig, 2006^{c g}
- Simulium stellatum Gil-Azevedo, Figueiro & Maia-Herzog, 2005^{c g}
- Simulium stelliferum Coscaron & Wygodzinsky, 1972^{c g}
- Simulium stenophallum Terteryan, 1952^{c g}
- Simulium stevensoni Edwards, 1927^{c g}
- Simulium strelkovi (Rubtsov, 1956)^{c g}
- Simulium striatum Brunetti, 1912^{c g}
- Simulium strigatum (Enderlein, 1933)^{i}
- Simulium strigidorsum (Enderlein, 1933)^{i c g}
- Simulium striginotum (Enderlein, 1933)^{i c g}
- Simulium suarezi Perez, Rassi and Ramirez, 1977^{i c g}
- Simulium subatrum Takaoka, 1983^{c g}
- Simulium subclavibranchium Lutz, 1910^{i c g}
- Simulium subcostatum (Takahasi, 1950)^{c g}
- Simulium subexiguum Field, 1967^{c g}
- Simulium subgriseum Rubtsov, 1940^{c g}
- Simulium sublonckei Craig, 2004^{c g}
- Simulium subnigrum Lutz, 1910^{i c g}
- Simulium subornatoides Rubtsov, 1947^{c g}
- Simulium subpallidum Lutz, 1910^{i c g}
- Simulium subpalmatum Davies & Gyorkos, 1992^{c g}
- Simulium subparadisium Craig, 2006^{c g}
- Simulium subpusillum Rubtsov, 1940^{c g}
- Simulium subratai ^{g}
- Simulium subtile Rubtsov, 1956^{c g}
- Simulium subvariegatum Rubtsov, 1940^{c g}
- Simulium suchariti Takaoka & Choochote, 2004^{c g}
- Simulium sulawesiense Takaoka & Roberts, 1988^{c g}
- Simulium sumapazense Coscaron & Py-Daniel, 1989^{c g}
- Simulium sumatraense Takaoka & Sigit, 1997^{c g}
- Simulium sundaicum Edwards, 1934^{c g}
- Simulium supercilium Craig, 2006^{c g}
- Simulium suplidoi Takaoka, 1983^{c g}
- Simulium surachaii Takaoka & Choochote, 2005^{c g}
- Simulium sutebense Takaoka, 2003^{c g}
- Simulium sutheppuiense Takaoka, Srisuka & Saeung, 2020^{g}
- Simulium suzukii Rubtsov, 1963^{c g}
- Simulium syafruddini Takaoka, 2003^{c g}
- Simulium synanceium Chen & Cao, 1983^{c g}
- Simulium syriacum Roubaud, 1909^{c g}
- Simulium sytshevskiae (Rubtsov, 1967)^{c g}
- Simulium syuhaiense Huang & Takaoka, 2008^{g}

=== T ===
- Simulium taalense Takaoka, 1983^{c g}
- Simulium tachengense An & Maha, 1994^{c g}
- Simulium tafae Smart & Clifford, 1965^{c g}
- Simulium tafulaense Takaoka, 2003^{c g}
- Simulium tahitiense Edwards, 1927^{c g}
- Simulium taichungense Takaoka & Huang, 2018^{g}
- Simulium taipei (Shiraki, 1935)^{c g}
- Simulium taipokauense Takaoka, Davies & Dudgeon, 1995^{c g}
- Simulium taishanense Sun & Li, 2000^{c g}
- Simulium taitungense Huang & Takaoka, 2011^{g}
- Simulium taiwanicum Takaoka, 1979^{c g}
- Simulium takae Takaoka, 2003^{c g}
- Simulium takahasii (Rubtsov, 1962)^{c g}
- Simulium takaokai Anbalagan^{g}
- Simulium takense Takaoka & Choochote, 2005^{c g}
- Simulium talassicum (Yankovsky, 1984)^{c g}
- Simulium tallaferroae Perez, 1971^{i c g}
- Simulium tamdaoense Takaoka & Sofian-Azirun^{g}
- Simulium tanae Xue, 1992^{c g}
- Simulium tanahrataense Takaoka & Sofian-Azirun^{g}
- Simulium tandrokum Pilaka & Elouard, 1999^{c g}
- Simulium tanetchowi Yankovsky, 1996^{c g}
- Simulium tani Takaoka & Davies, 1995^{g}
- Simulium tarbagataicum (Rubtsov, 1967)^{c g}
- Simulium tarnogradskii Rubtsov, 1940^{c g}
- Simulium tarsale Williston, 1896^{i c g}
- Simulium tarsatum Macquart, 1847^{i c g}
- Simulium tashikulganense Mahe, Ma & An, 2003^{c g}
- Simulium tatianae (Bodrova, 1981)^{c g}
- Simulium taulingense Takaoka, 1979^{c g}
- Simulium tauricum (Rubtsov, 1956)^{c g}
- Simulium taxodium Snoddy and Beshear, 1968^{i c g}
- Simulium taylori Gibbins, 1938^{c g}
- Simulium taythienense Takaoka & Sofian-Azirun^{g}
- Simulium teerachanense Takaoka, Srisuka & Fukuda, 2020^{g}
- Simulium tekamense Takaoka & Sofian-Azirun^{g}
- Simulium temascalense Najera & Vulcano, 1962^{c g}
- Simulium tenebrosum Takaoka, Srisuka & Saeung, 2018^{g}
- Simulium tenerificum Crosskey, 1988^{c g}
- Simulium tentaculum Gibbins, 1936^{c g}
- Simulium tenuatum Chen, 2000^{c g}
- Simulium tenuipes Knab, 1914^{c g}
- Simulium tenuistylum Datta, 1973^{c g}
- Simulium tenuitarsus (Rubtsov, 1969)^{c g}
- Simulium tergospinosum Hamada, 2000^{c g}
- Simulium teruamanga Craig & Craig, 1987^{c g}
- Simulium tescorum Stone and Boreham, 1965^{i c g}
- Simulium thailandicum Takaoka & Suzuki, 1984^{c g}
- Simulium thienemanni Edwards, 1934^{c g}
- Simulium thituyenae Takaoka & Pham, 2015^{g}
- Simulium thuathienense Takaoka & Sofian-Azirun, 2015^{g}
- Simulium thungchangense Takaoka, Srisuka & Saeung, 2020^{g}
- Simulium thyolense Vajime, Tambala, Kruger & Post, 2000^{c g}
- Simulium tianchi Chen, Zhang & Yang, 2003^{c g}
- Simulium timondavidi Giudicelli, 1961^{c g}
- Simulium timorense Takaoka, 2006^{c g}
- Simulium timpohonense Takaoka & Sofian-Azirun^{g}
- Simulium tjanschanicum Rubtsov, 1963^{c g}
- Simulium tjidodense Edwards, 1934^{c g}
- Simulium tobetsuense Ono, 1977^{c g}
- Simulium tokachiense Takaoka, 2006^{c g}
- Simulium tokarense Takaoka, 1973^{c g}
- Simulium tolimaense Coscaron, 1985^{c g}
- Simulium tolongoinae Grenier & Brunhes, 1972^{c g}
- Simulium tomae Takaoka, 2003^{c g}
- Simulium tomentosum Delfinado, 1969^{c g}
- Simulium tomohonense Takaoka, 2003^{c g}
- Simulium tondewandouense Fain & Elsen, 1973^{c g}
- Simulium tongbaishanense Chen, 2006^{c g}
- Simulium torautense Takaoka & Roberts, 1988^{c g}
- Simulium tormentor Adler, Currie & Wood, 2004^{c g}
- Simulium torresianum Mackerras & Mackerras, 1955^{c g}
- Simulium tosariense Edwards, 1934^{c g}
- Simulium toubkal Bouzidi & Giudicelli, 1986^{c g}
- Simulium touffeum Gibbins, 1937^{c g}
- Simulium townsendi Malloch, 1912^{i c g}
- Simulium trangense ^{g}
- Simulium transbaikalicum Rubtsov, 1940^{c g}
- Simulium transcaspicum Enderlein, 1921^{c g}
- Simulium transiens Rubtzov, 1940^{i c g}
- Simulium travassosi D'andretta and D'andretta, 1947^{i c g}
- Simulium travisi Vargas, Vargas & Ramirez-Perez, 1993^{c g}
- Simulium triangustum An, Guo & Xu, 1995^{c g}
- Simulium tricorne Leon, 1945^{c g}
- Simulium tricrenum (Rubtsov & Carlsson, 1965)^{c g}
- Simulium tridens Freeman & Meillon, 1953^{c g}
- Simulium trifasciatum Curtis, 1839^{c g}
- Simulium triglobus Takaoka & Kuvangkadilok, 1999^{c g}
- Simulium trilineatum (Rubtsov, 1956)^{c g}
- Simulium trirugosum Davies & Gyorkos, 1988^{c g}
- Simulium trisphaerae Wanson & Henrard, 1944^{c g}
- Simulium trivittatum Malloch, 1914^{i c g}
- Simulium trombetense Hamada, Py-Daniel & Adler, 1998^{c g}
- Simulium trukense Stone, 1964^{c g}
- Simulium truncata (Lundstrom, 1911)^{i}
- Simulium truncatum (Lundstrom, 1911)^{c g}
- Simulium tsharae (Yankovsky, 1982)^{c g}
- Simulium tsheburovae (Rubtsov, 1956)^{c g}
- Simulium tshernovskii (Rubtsov, 1956)^{c g}
- Simulium tshuni Yankovsky, 2006^{c g}
- Simulium tuberculum Craig, 2006^{c g}
- Simulium tuberosum (Lundstrom, 1911)^{i c g b} (Twinn's black fly)
- Simulium tuenense Takaoka, 1979^{c g}
- Simulium tukorongense Takaoka & Tenedero, 2019^{g}
- Simulium tumidum Takaoka, 2003^{c g}
- Simulium tumninum Bodrova, 1989^{c g}
- Simulium tumpaense Takaoka & Roberts, 1988^{c g}
- Simulium tumulosum Rubtsov, 1956^{c g}
- Simulium tumum Chen & Zhang, 2001^{c g}
- Simulium tunja Coscaron, 1991^{c g}
- Simulium turgaicum Rubtsov, 1940^{c g}
- Simulium tuyense Takaoka, 1983^{c g}

=== U-V ===
- Simulium uaense Sechan, 1983^{c g}
- Simulium ubiquitum Adler, Currie & Wood, 2004^{c g}
- Simulium uchidai (Takahasi, 1950)^{c g}
- Simulium udomi Takaoka & Choochote, 2006^{c g}
- Simulium uemotoi Sato, Takaoka & Fukuda, 2004^{c g}
- Simulium ufengense Takaoka, 1979^{c g}
- Simulium ulyssesi Py-Daniel & Coscaron, 2001^{c g}
- Simulium umphangense Takaoka, Srisuka & Saeung, 2017^{g}
- Simulium uncum Zhang & Chen, 2001^{c g}
- Simulium undecimum Takaoka, Srisuka & Saeung, 2018^{g}
- Simulium underhilli Stone and Snoddy, 1969^{i c g}
- Simulium undulatum Craig, 2006^{c g}
- Simulium unicornutum Pomeroy, 1920^{c g}
- Simulium unii Takaoka & Pham^{g}
- Simulium unum Datta, 1975^{c g}
- Simulium upikae Takaoka & Davies, 1996^{c g}
- Simulium urbanum Davies, 1966^{c g}
- Simulium urubambanum Enderlein, 1933^{i c g}
- Simulium urundiense Fain, 1950^{c g}
- Simulium usovae (Golini, 1987)^{c}
- Simulium ussovae Bodrova, 1989^{c g}
- Simulium vampirum Adler, Currie & Wood, 2004^{c g}
- Simulium vamprium Adler, Currie & Wood, 2004^{c g}
- Simulium vangilsi Wanson, 1947^{c g}
- Simulium vanluni Ya'cob, Takaoka & Sofian-Azirun, 2017^{g}
- Simulium vantshi (Petrova, 1983)^{c g}
- Simulium vantshum Chubareva, 2000^{c g}
- Simulium varians Lutz, 1909^{i c g}
- Simulium varicorne Edwards, 1925^{c g}
- Simulium variegatum (Meigen, 1818)^{c g}
- Simulium veltistshevi Rubtsov, 1940^{c g}
- Simulium velutinum (Santos Abreu, 1922)^{c g}
- Simulium venator Dyar and Shannon, 1927^{i c g}
- Simulium venezuelense Perez & Peterson, 1981^{c g}
- Simulium venustum Say, 1823^{i c g}
- Simulium veracruzanum Vargas, Palacios & Najera, 1946^{c g}
- Simulium verecundum Stone and Jamnback, 1955^{i c g}
- Simulium vernum (Macquart, 1826)^{i c g}
- Simulium vershininae Yankovsky, 1979^{c g}
- Simulium versicolor Lutz and Tovar, 1928^{i c g}
- Simulium vidanoi (Rubtsov, 1964)^{c g}
- Simulium vietnamense Takaoka, Sofian-Azirun & Chen, 2014^{g}
- Simulium vigintifile (Dinulescu, 1966)^{c g}
- Simulium vilhenai Luna de Carvalho, 1962^{c g}
- Simulium violacescens Enderlein, 1933^{i c g}
- Simulium violator Adler, Currie & Wood, 2004^{c g}
- Simulium violovitshi (Rubtsov, 1962)^{c g}
- Simulium virgatum Coquillett, 1902^{i c g}
- Simulium visayaense Takaoka, 1983^{c g}
- Simulium vischarvi Chubareva, 1996^{c g}
- Simulium visuti Takaoka & Choochote, 2006^{c g}
- Simulium vitile (Rubtsov, 1955)^{c g}
- Simulium vittatum (Zetterstedt, 1838)^{i c g}
- Simulium voilense Sherban, 1960^{c g}
- Simulium volhynicum (Usova & Sukhomlin, 1990)^{g}
- Simulium voltae Grenier & Ovazza, 1960^{c g}
- Simulium vorax Pomeroy, 1922^{c g}
- Simulium vulcanoae Diaz Najera, 1969^{c g}
- Simulium vulgare Dorogostaisky & Rubtsov, 1935^{c g}

=== W-Z ===
- Simulium wakrisense Takaoka, 2003^{c g}
- Simulium walterwittmeri Wygodzinsky, 1958^{c g}
- Simulium wambanum Elsen, Fain & de Boeck, 1983^{c g}
- Simulium wamenae Smart & Clifford, 1965^{c g}
- Simulium wanchaii Takaoka, 2006^{c g}
- Simulium wangxianense Chen, Zhang & Bi, 2004^{c g}
- Simulium wantoatense Smart & Clifford, 1965^{c g}
- Simulium watanabei Takaoka, 2003^{c g}
- Simulium waterfallum Zhang, Yang & Chen, 2003^{c g}
- Simulium watetoense Takaoka, 2003^{c g}
- Simulium weiningense Chen & Zhang, 1997^{c g}
- Simulium weisiense Deng, 2005^{c g}
- Simulium weji Takaoka, 2001^{c g}
- Simulium wellmanni Roubaud, 1906^{c g}
- Simulium weyeri Garms & Hausermann, 1968^{c g}
- Simulium wilhelmlandae Smart, 1944^{c g}
- Simulium wirthi Peterson & Craig, 1997^{c g}
- Simulium wolffhuegeli (Enderlein, 1922)^{c g}
- Simulium woodi Meillon, 1930^{c g}
- Simulium wuayaraka Ortiz, 1957^{i}
- Simulium wulaofengense Chen & Zhang^{g}
- Simulium wulindongense An, 2006^{c g}
- Simulium wutaishanense An & Ge, 2003^{c g}
- Simulium wuzhishanense Chen, 2003^{c g}
- Simulium wygodzinskyorum Coscaron & Py-Daniel, 1989^{c g}
- Simulium wygoi Coscaron, Ibanez-Bernal & Coscaron-Arias, 1999^{c g}
- Simulium wyomingense (Stone and De Foliart, 1959)^{i c g}
- Simulium xanthinum Edwards, 1933^{c g}
- Simulium xanthogastrum Rubtsov, 1951^{c g}
- Simulium xiaodaoense Liu, Shi & An, 2004^{c g}
- Simulium xiaolongtanense Cheng, Luo & Yang, 2006^{c g}
- Simulium xinbinense (Chen & Cao, 1983)^{c g}
- Simulium xingyiense Chen & Zhang, 1998^{c g}
- Simulium xinzhouense Chen & Zhang^{g}
- Simulium xuandai Takaoka & Sofian-Azirun^{g}
- Simulium xuandei Takaoka & Pham, 2015^{g}
- Simulium yacuchuspi Wygodzinsky and Coscaron, 1967^{i c g}
- Simulium yadongense Deng & Chen, 1993^{c g}
- Simulium yaeyamaense Takaoka, 1991^{c g}
- Simulium yahense Vajime & Dunbar, 1975^{c g}
- Simulium yamayaense Ogata & Sasa, 1954^{c g}
- Simulium yanaense Anbalagan, Vijayan, Balachandran & Dinakaran, 2019^{g}
- Simulium yemenense Crosskey & Garms, 1982^{c g}
- Simulium yepocapense Dalmat, 1949^{c g}
- Simulium yokotense Shiraki, 1935^{c g}
- Simulium yonagoense Okamoto, 1958^{c g}
- Simulium yonakuniense Takaoka, 1972^{c g}
- Simulium yongi Takaoka & Davies, 1997^{c g}
- Simulium yuanbaoshanense Chen, Zhang & Zhang, 2007^{c g}
- Simulium yuleae Takaoka, 1995^{c g}
- Simulium yunnanense Chen & Zhang, 2004^{c g}
- Simulium yuntaiense Chen, Wen & Wei, 2006^{c g}
- Simulium yuphae Takaoka & Choochote, 2005^{c g}
- Simulium yushangense Takaoka, 1979^{c g}
- Simulium yvonneae Takaoka & Low, 2018^{g}
- Simulium zakhariense (Rubtsov, 1955)^{c g}
- Simulium zaporojae Pavlichenko, 1986^{c g}
- Simulium zempoalense Vargas, Palacios & Najera, 1946^{c g}
- Simulium zephyrus Adler, Currie & Wood, 2004^{c g}
- Simulium zetterstedti Carlsson, 1962^{c g}
- Simulium zhangjiajiense Chen, Zhang & Bi, 2004^{c g}
- Simulium zhiltzovae (Rubtsov, 1976)^{c g}
- Simulium zinaidae Crosskey, 1997^{c g}
- Simulium zombaense Freeman & Meillon, 1953^{c g}
- Simulium zonatum Edwards, 1934^{c g}

Data sources: i = ITIS, c = Catalogue of Life, g = GBIF, b = Bugguide.net
