= Simulium tuberosum =

Scientific classification
- Domain: Eukaryota
- Kingdom: Animalia
- Phylum: Arthropoda
- Class: Insecta
- Order: Diptera
- Family: Simuliidae
- Genus: Simulium
- Species: S. tuberosum

Binomial name
- Simulium tuberosum (Lundstrom, 1911)

Synonyms
- Melusina tuberosa Lundstrom, 1911; Simulium perissum Dyar and Shannon, 1927; Simulium turmale Twinn, 1938; Simulium twinni Stains and Knowlton, 1940; Simulium vandalicum Dyar and Shannon, 1927

Species of fly

Simulium tuberosum, known generally as Twinn's black fly, is a species of black fly in the family Simuliidae. Other common names include the superfluous black fly and tubercled black fly.
