= Simulium buissoni =

Scientific classification
- Domain: Eukaryota
- Kingdom: Animalia
- Phylum: Arthropoda
- Class: Insecta
- Order: Diptera
- Family: Simuliidae
- Genus: Simulium
- Species: S. buissoni

Binomial name
- Simulium buissoni Roubaud, 1906

Species of fly

Simulium buissoni, commonly referred to as the black nono or no-no noir des rivières, is a midge species in the genus Simulium found on Nuku Hiva and Eiao, Marquesas archipelago in Polynesia.
