= Simulium fibrinflatum =

Scientific classification
- Domain: Eukaryota
- Kingdom: Animalia
- Phylum: Arthropoda
- Class: Insecta
- Order: Diptera
- Family: Simuliidae
- Genus: Simulium
- Species: S. fibrinflatum

Binomial name
- Simulium fibrinflatum Twinn, 1936

Species of fly

Simulium fibrinflatum, the inflated gnat, is a species of black flies, insects in the family Simuliidae.
