= Simulium courtneyi =

Scientific classification
- Kingdom: Animalia
- Phylum: Arthropoda
- Clade: Pancrustacea
- Class: Insecta
- Order: Diptera
- Family: Simuliidae
- Genus: Simulium
- Species: S. courtneyi

Binomial name
- Simulium courtneyi Takaoka & Adler, 1997

Synonyms
- Simulium (Daviesellum) courtneyi Takaoka & Adler, 1997

Species of fly

Simulium courtneyi is a species of black fly, first described in 1997 by Takaoka & Adler. Takaoka & Adler described it as belonging to a new subgenus, Daviesellum and honoured Gregory W. Courtney by giving the species epithet as courtneyi Their paper describes males, females, pupae and larvae of the species.

It is found in both Thailand and on the Malaysian Peninsula, in "heavily shaded streams" "flowing over bedrock cascades".
