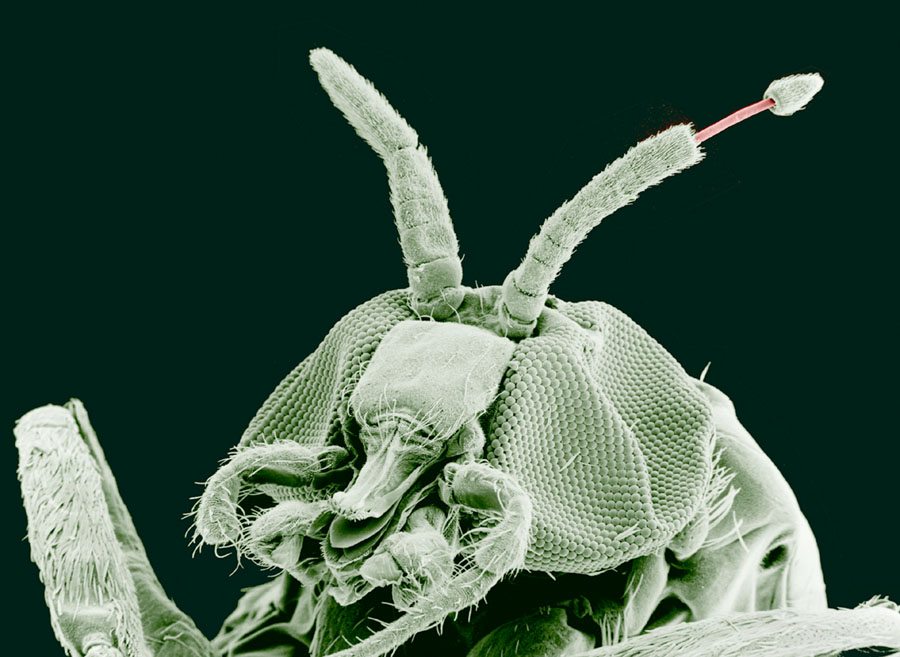

Scientific classification
- Kingdom: Animalia
- Phylum: Arthropoda
- Clade: Pancrustacea
- Class: Insecta
- Order: Diptera
- Family: Simuliidae
- Genus: Simulium
- Species: S. yahense

Binomial name
- Simulium yahense Vajime & Dunbar, 1975

= Simulium yahense =

Species of fly

Simulium yahense is a species of black flies found in rainforests in West Africa. Their larval stages are found in "smaller, more shaded, cooler breeding waters." One particular group, now eradicated, was found only on the island of Bioko, and was an extremely effective vector for the parasitic worm Onchocerca volvulus that causes onchocerciasis, or "river blindness".
