= Simulium claricentrum =

Scientific classification
- Kingdom: Animalia
- Phylum: Arthropoda
- Clade: Pancrustacea
- Class: Insecta
- Order: Diptera
- Family: Simuliidae
- Genus: Simulium
- Species: S. claricentrum

Binomial name
- Simulium claricentrum Adler, 1990

Synonyms
- Simulium (Shewellomyia) claricentrum Adler, 1990

Species of fly

Simulium claricentrum is a species of black fly, first described in 1990 by Adler, and found in North America.

== Images ==
From Simulium (Trichodagmia) (Diptera, Simuliidae) phylogeny revisited: the Neotropical and Afrotropical connection.

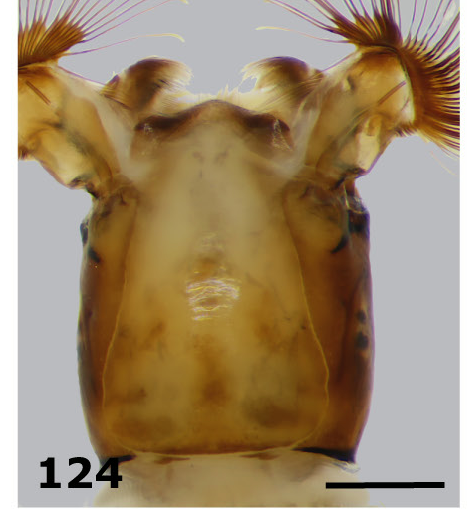
larval part

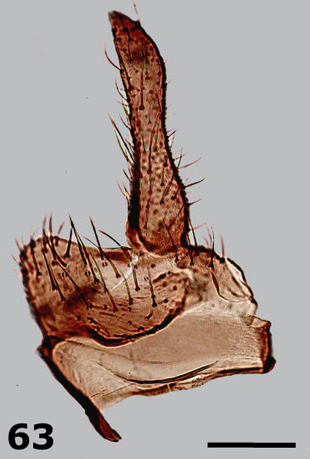
Males. Gonocoxite and gonostyle

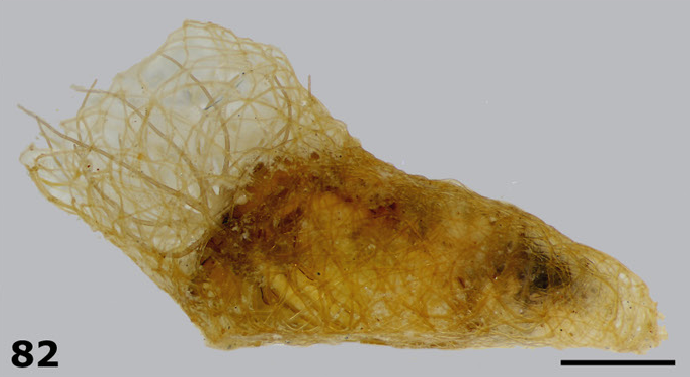
Pupae

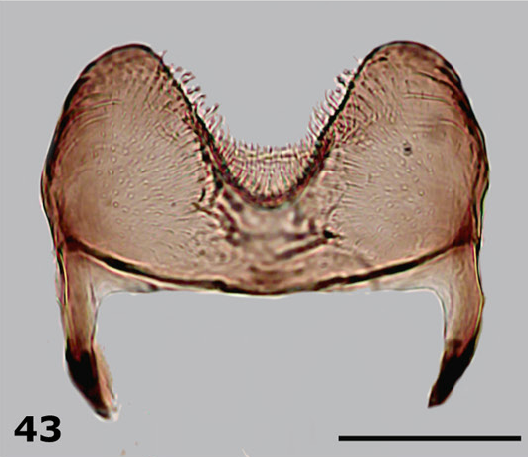
Male. Ventral plate
