= Simulium balteatum =

Scientific classification
- Kingdom: Animalia
- Phylum: Arthropoda
- Clade: Pancrustacea
- Class: Insecta
- Order: Diptera
- Family: Simuliidae
- Genus: Simulium
- Species: S. balteatum

Binomial name
- Simulium balteatum Adler, Currie & Wood, 2004

Synonyms
- Simulium (Boreosimulium) balteatum Adler, Currie & Wood, 2004

Species of fly

Simulium balteatum, the belted black fly, is a species of black fly, first described in 2004 by Adler, Currie & Wood.
