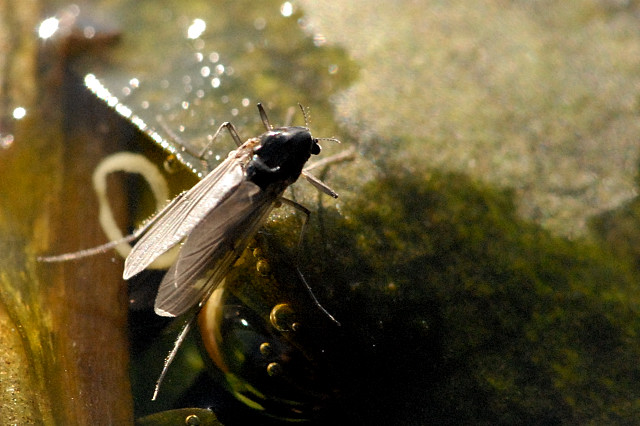

Scientific classification
- Kingdom: Animalia
- Phylum: Arthropoda
- Class: Insecta
- Order: Diptera
- Family: Simuliidae
- Genus: Simulium
- Species: S. variegatum

Binomial name
- Simulium variegatum Meigen, 1818

= Simulium variegatum =

Species of fly

Simulium variegatum is a species of fly in the family Simuliidae. It is found in the Palearctic.
