= Simulium latipes =

Scientific classification
- Kingdom: Animalia
- Phylum: Arthropoda
- Class: Insecta
- Order: Diptera
- Family: Simuliidae
- Genus: Simulium
- Species: S. latipes

Binomial name
- Simulium latipes (Meigen, 1804)

Species of fly

Simulium latipes is a species of fly in the family Simuliidae. It is found in the Palearctic.
