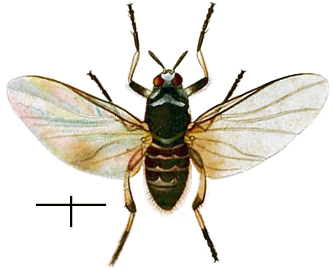
- Simulium trifasciatum

Scientific classification
- Kingdom: Animalia
- Phylum: Arthropoda
- Clade: Pancrustacea
- Class: Insecta
- Order: Diptera
- Family: Simuliidae
- Subfamily: Simuliinae
- Tribe: Simuliini
- Genus: Simulium; Latreille, 1802

Type species
- S. colombaschense (Scopoli, 1780) usually attrib. Fabricius, 1787

Subgenera
- See text

Synonyms
- Atractocera Meigen, 1803; Melusina Hendel 1908; Simulia Olfers, 1816; Simulinum; Titanopteryx Enderlein, 1925

= Simulium =

Genus of flies

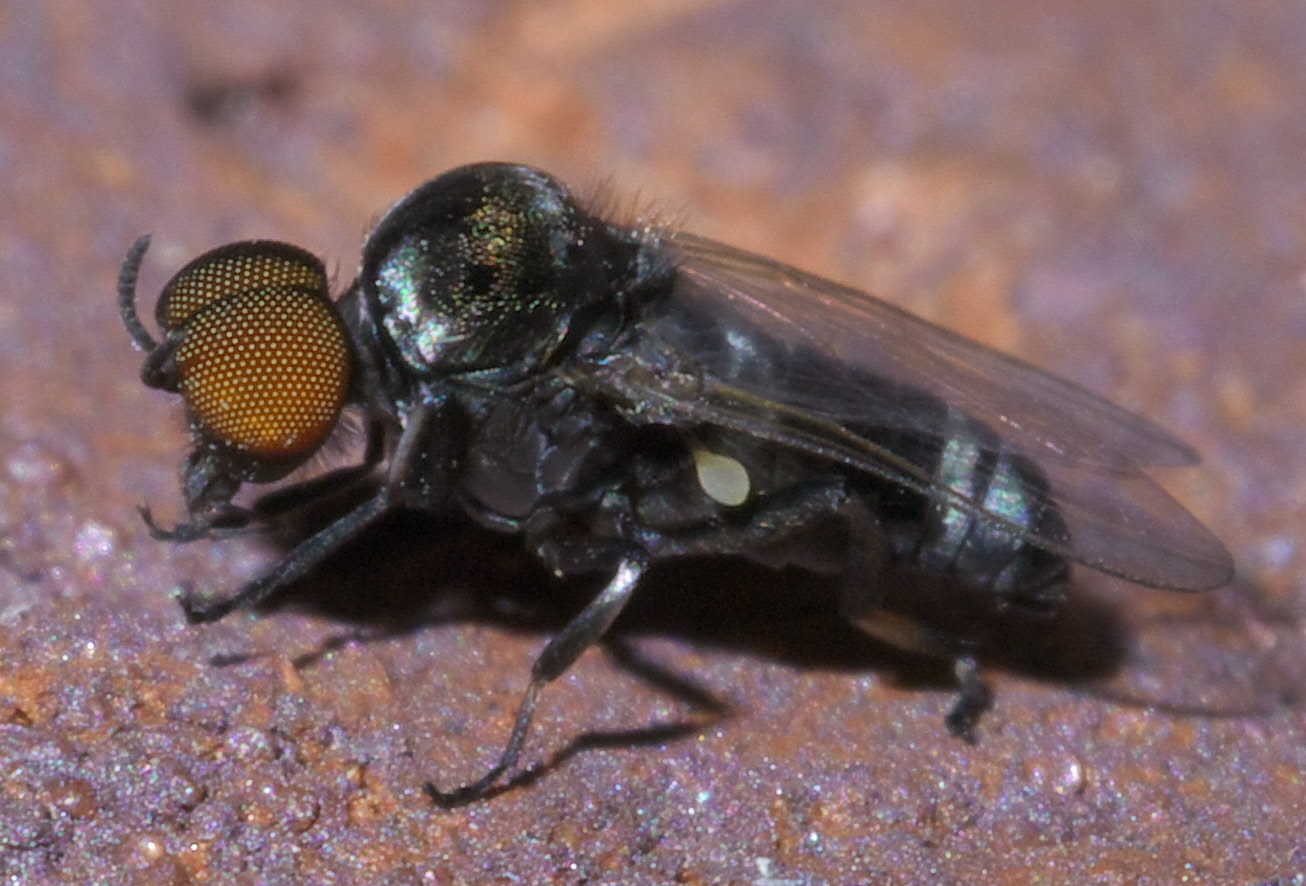

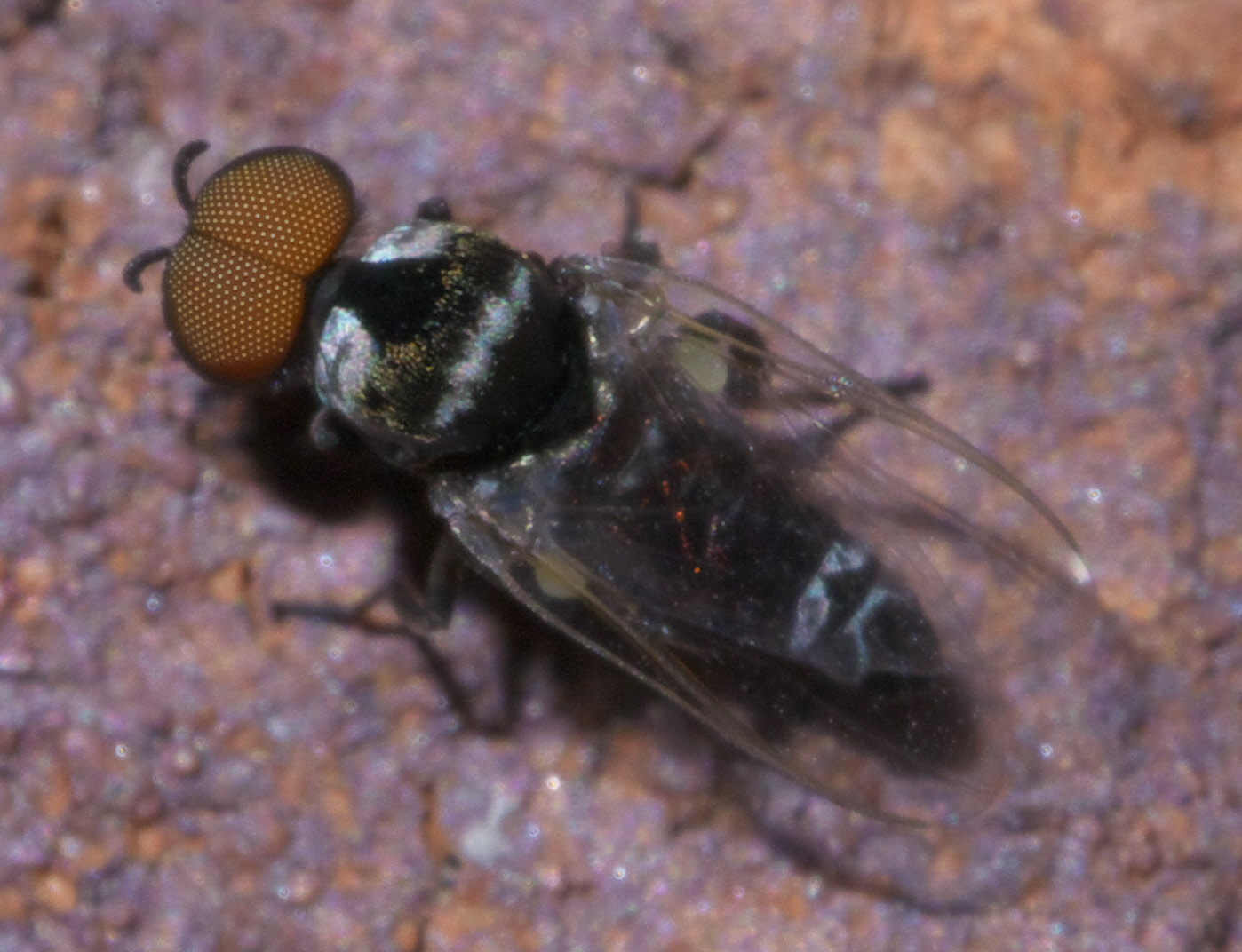

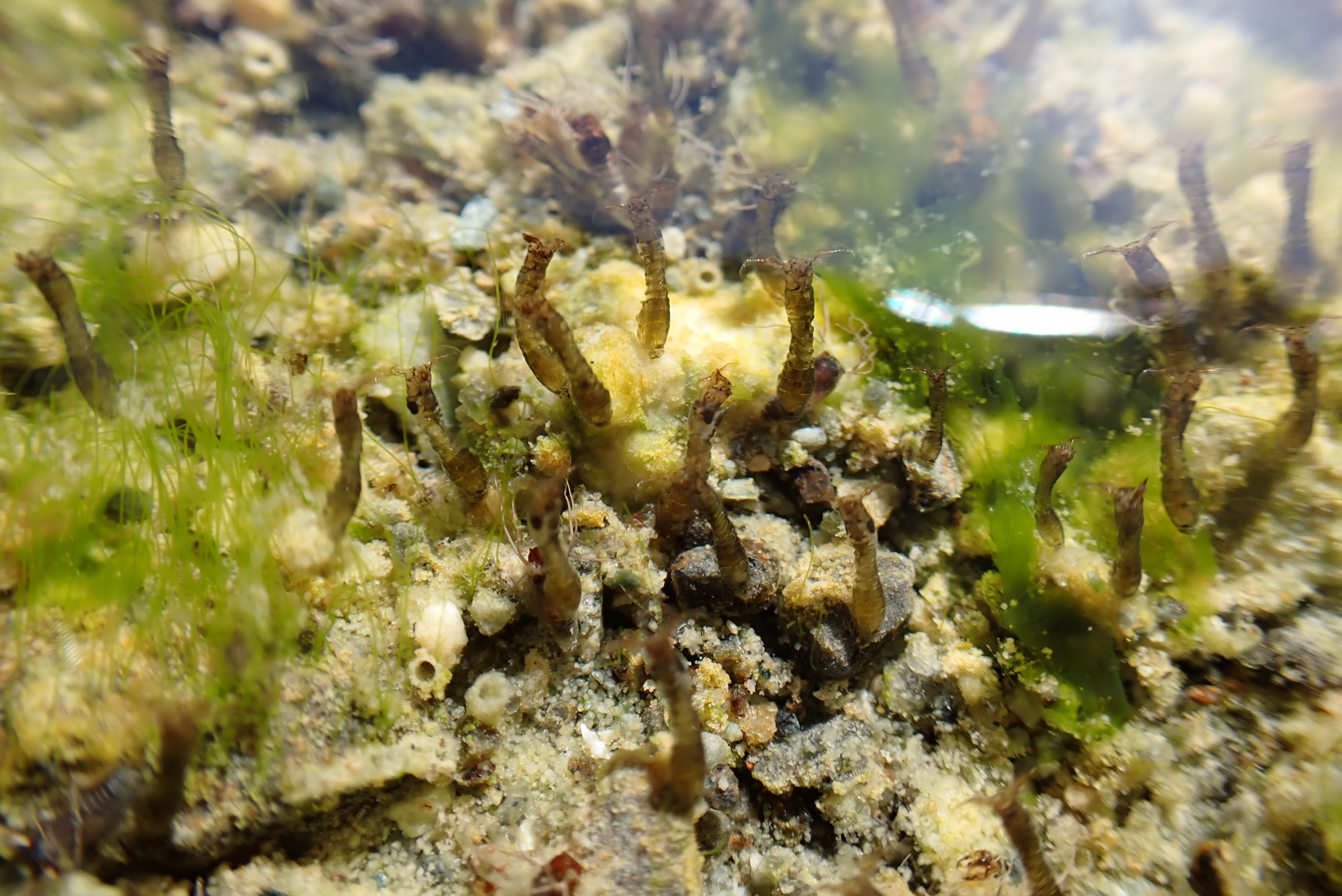
Blackfly Larvae from United Arab Emirates

Simulium is a genus of black flies, which may transmit diseases such as onchocerciasis (river blindness).

It is a large genus with almost 2,000 species and 38 subgenera.

The flies are pool feeders. Their saliva, which contains anticoagulants, a number of enzymes and histamine, is mixed with the blood, preventing clotting until it is ingested by the fly. These bites cause localized tissue damage, and if the number of feeding flies is sufficient, their feeding may produce a blood-loss anaemia.

The host's reaction to fly attacks may include systemic illness, allergic reactions or even death, presumably mediated by histamine. In humans, this systemic reaction is known as "black fly fever" and is characterized by headaches, fever, nausea, adenitis, generalized dermatitis, and allergic asthma.

== Systematics ==
Subgenera:

- Afrosimulium Crosskey, 1969
- Anasolen Enderlein, 1930
- Asiosimulium Takaoka & Choochote, 2005
- Aspathia Enderlein, 1935
- Boophthora Enderlein, 1921
- Boreosimulium Rubtsov & Yankovsky, 1982
- Byssodon Enderlein, 1925
- Chirostilbia Enderlein, 1921
- Crosskeyellum Grenier & Bailly-Choumara, 1970
- Daviesellum Takaoka & Adler, 1997
- Ectemnaspis Enderlein, 1934
- Edwardsellum Enderlein, 1921
- Eusimulium Roubaud, 1906
- Freemanellum Crosskey, 1969
- Gomphostilbia Enderlein, 1921
- Hebridosimulium Grenier & Rageau, 1961
- Hellichiella Rivosecchi & Cardinali, 1975
- Hemicnetha Enderlein, 1934
- Inaequalium Coscarón & Wygodzinsky, 1984
- Inseliellum Rubtsov, 1974
- Lewisellum Crosskey, 1969
- Meilloniellum Rubtsov, 1962
- Metomphalus Enderlein, 1935
- Montisimulium Rubtsov, 1974
- Morops Enderlein, 1930
- Nevermannia Enderlein, 1921
- Notolepria Enderlein, 1930
- Obuchovia Rubtsov, 1947
- Phoretomyia Crosskey, 1969
- Pomeroyellum Rubtsov, 1962
- Psaroniocompsa Enderlein, 1934
- Psilopelmia Enderlein, 1934
- Psilozia Enderlein, 1936
- Pternaspatha Enderlein, 1930
- Rubzovia Petrova, 1983
- Schoenbaueria Enderlein, 1921
- Simulium Latreille, 1802
- Trichodagmia Enderlein, 1934
- Wallacellum Takaoka, 1983
- Wilhelmia Enderlein, 1921
- Xenosimulium Crosskey, 1969

Species:

- List of Simulium species

== Malaysia ==
In Peninsular Malaysia 35 species of preimaginal black flies were discovered in a study in 2016, including Simulium digrammicum, which had been considered locally extinct.

== In Balkan folklore ==
In Serbian mythology there is a legend concerning an ala (demon) (a female entity associated with hailstorms, madness and disease) fabled to have died in a cave near the town of Golubac in the Pozarevac District in Eastern Serbia. The rotting corpse of this being is said to send forth each Spring a swarm of Golubatz flies – individuals of the species Simulium colombaschense. The fact that the Golubatz fly is a voracious bloodsucker and disease vector accords well with the functions attributed to the ala, emphasising her malign potency – even in death – while the legend provides, reciprocally, a folkloric explanation for the genesis of so unpleasant an insect. The specific name colombaschense signifies 'of Golubac' (Serbian pronunciation: 'Golubatz') – the name of the village (signifying dovecote from Slavic golub a dove/pigeon (see Columbidae), cognate with Latin: columba, having the same meaning). S. colombaschense was a notorious insect pest of the Banat (part of the Pannonian Basin, bordered to the south by the Danube), during the 18th century.
