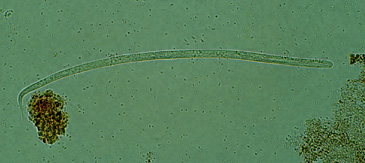
- Onchocerca volvulus, the causative agent of river blindness

Scientific classification
- Kingdom: Animalia
- Phylum: Nematoda
- Class: Chromadorea
- Order: Rhabditida
- Family: Onchocercidae
- Genus: Onchocerca
- Species: O. volvulus

Binomial name
- Onchocerca volvulus Leuckart, 1893

= Onchocerca volvulus =

Nematode

Onchocerca volvulus is an arthropod-borne filarial nematode (roundworm) that causes onchocerciasis (river blindness), and is the second-leading cause of blindness due to infection worldwide after trachoma. It is one of the 20 neglected tropical diseases listed by the World Health Organization, with elimination from certain countries expected by 2025.

John O'Neill, an Irish surgeon, first described Onchocerca volvulus in 1874, when he found it to be the causative agent of 'craw-craw', a skin disease found in West Africa. A Guatemalan doctor, Rodolfo Robles, first linked it to visual impairment in 1917. The parasite was formally described and named by German zoologist and parasitologist Rudolf Leuckart in 1893.

Onchocerca volvulus is primarily found in sub-Saharan Africa, and there is also disease transmission in some South American nations, as well as Yemen (see global map under Epidemiology). It is spread from person to person via female biting blackflies of the genus Simulium, and humans are the only known definitive host.

== Morphology ==
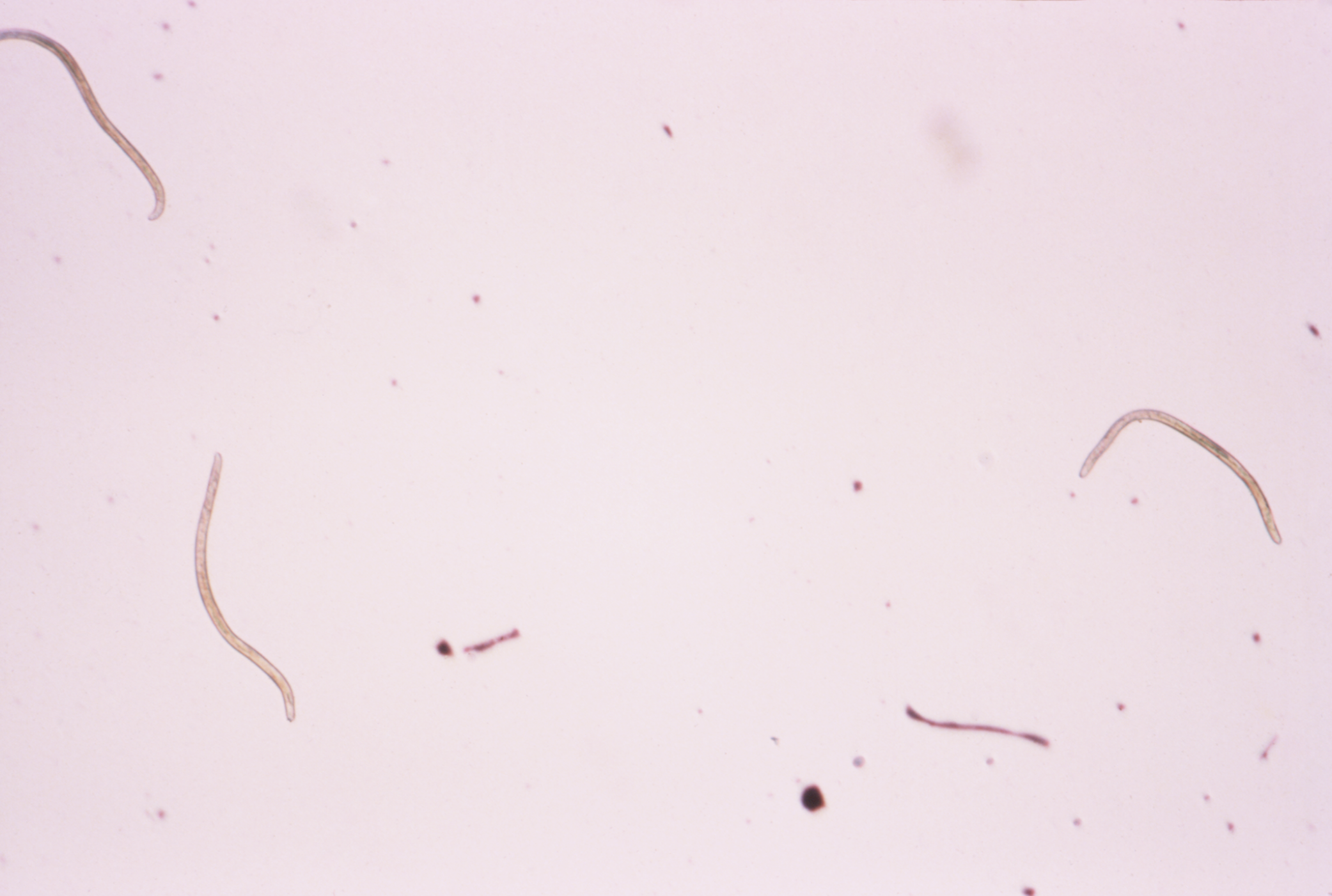
Photomicrograph (glycine mount) of several O. volvulus individuals

Onchocerca volvulus parasites obtain nutrients from the human host by ingesting blood or by diffusion through their cuticle. They may be able to trigger blood-vessel formation because dense vascular networks are often found surrounding the worms. They are distinguished from other human-infecting filarial nematodes by the presence of deep transverse striations.

It is a dioecious species, containing distinct males and females, which form nodules under the skin in humans. Mature female worms permanently reside in these fibrous nodules, while male worms are free to move around the subcutaneous tissue. The males are smaller than females, with male worms measuring 23 mm in length compared to 230–700 mm in females.

The release of oocytes (eggs) in female worms does not depend upon the presence of a male worm, although they may attract male worms using unidentified pheromones. The first larval stage, microfilariae, are 300 μm in length and unsheathed, meaning that when they mature into microfilariae, they exit from the envelope of the egg.

== Lifecycle ==
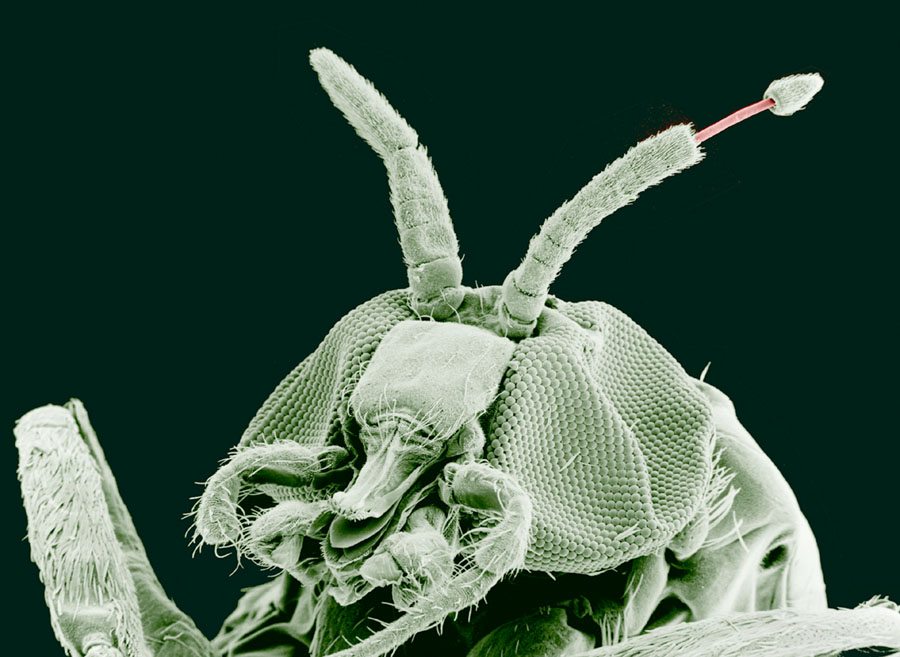
Onchocerca volvulus emerging from a blackfly

The average adult worm lifespan is 15 years, and mature females can produce between 500 and 1,500 microfilariae per day. The normal microfilarial lifespan is 1.0 to 1.5 years; however, their presence in the bloodstream causes little to no immune response until death or degradation of the microfilariae or adult worms.

=== Blackfly stages ===
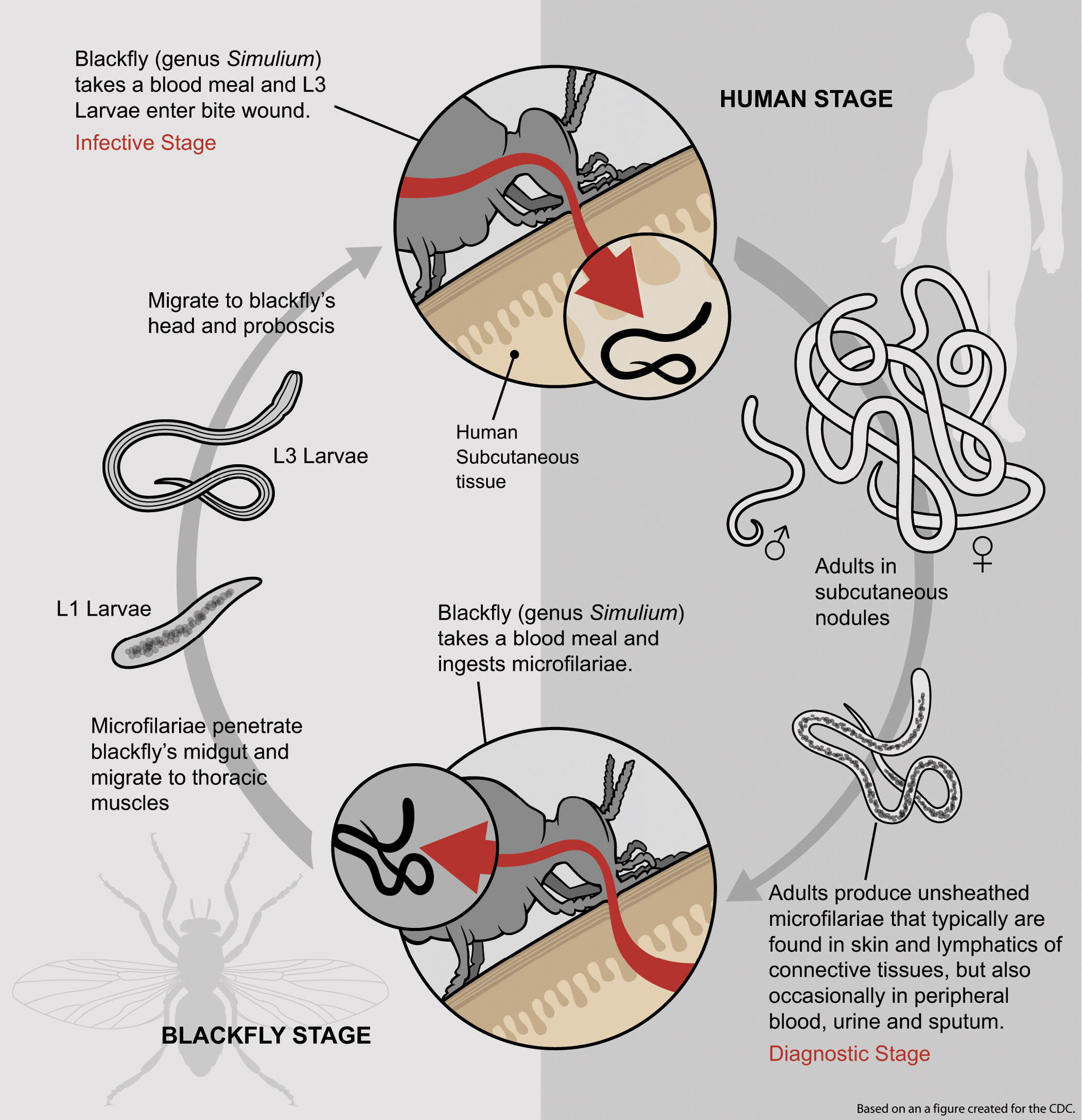
The lifecycle of O. volvulus

1. The microfilariae of O. volvulus are found in the dermis layer of skin in the host.
2. When a female Simulium blackfly takes a blood meal from an infected host, the microfilariae are also ingested.
3. From here, the microfilariae penetrate the gut and migrate to the thoracic flight muscles, where they enter the first juvenile phase, J_{1}.
4. After maturing into J_{2}, the second juvenile phase, they migrate to the proboscis, where they are found in the saliva.
5. J_{2} stage juveniles then mature into infectious stage three juveniles, J_{3}, in the saliva. The lifecycle in the blackfly takes between one and three weeks.

=== Human stages ===
1. When the female blackfly takes a blood meal, J_{3} juveniles pass into the human bloodstream.
2. From here, the juveniles migrate to the subcutaneous tissue, where they form nodules and mature into adult worms over a period of 6–12 months.
3. After maturation, the smaller adult males migrate from nodules to subcutaneous tissue, where they mate with the larger adult females.
4. The eggs mature internally to form stage-one microfilariae, which are released from the female's body one at a time and remain in the subcutaneous tissue.
5. The microfilariae are taken up by a female blackfly when it takes a blood meal, thus completing the lifecycle of O. volvulus.

== Disease ==
Onchocerca volvulus causes onchocerciasis, which causes severe itching. Long-term infection can cause keratitis, an inflammation of the cornea in the eye, and ultimately leads to blindness. Symptoms are caused by the microfilariae and the immune response to infection, rather than the adults themselves. The most effective treatment involves using ivermectin, although resistance to this drug has been reported as developing. Ivermectin prevents female worms from releasing microfilariae for several months, thus relieving symptoms and temporarily preventing transmission. However, this does not kill adult worms, so it must be taken once annually as long as adult worms are present.

Onchocerca volvulus has been proposed as one of the causative agents of nodding syndrome, a condition that affects children aged 5 to 15 and is currently only observed in South Sudan, Tanzania, and northern Uganda. Although the cause of the disease is unknown, O. volvulus is being increasingly studied as a possible cause due to its ubiquity in areas where the disease is found.

== Epidemiology ==
Geographical distribution of O. volvulus as of March 2017: Endemic countries are shown in red, previous endemic countries in blue, and countries with no local cases in orange.

An estimated 187 million people are at risk of O. volvulus infection, with 17–25 million people infected and 0.8 million showing some impairment of vision. O. volvulus has not directly caused a single death, but has cost 1.1 million disability adjusted life years, which measure the number of years of healthy life lost due to a specific disease and show the burden of a disease.

Simulium blackfly adults require moving water to breed and eggs remain in water until they exit from the pupa and enter the adult stage of their lifecycle. Due to this restriction, O. volvulus is only found around streams or rivers. Artificial water systems, such as hydroelectric power plants, built in Africa, provide ideal conditions all year for blackfly development and make controlling its spread difficult.

About 99% of cases of onchocerciasis are found in 31 countries in sub-Saharan Africa, although areas of limited transmission occur in Brazil, Venezuela, and Yemen. The disease is thought to have been imported into Latin America through the slave trade. Onchocerciasis was eliminated from Colombia in 2013, Ecuador in 2014, Mexico in 2015, and Guatemala in 2016 due to control programs that used mass drug administration with ivermectin.

== Genome ==
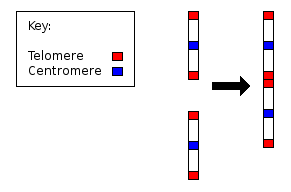
Representation of the possible chromosome fusion seen in O. volvulus

The total genome size of O. volvulus is 1.5×10^{8} base pairs and contains around 4,000 genes, with genes for collagen and cuticular proteins being highly expressed in mature adults. O. volvulus has four chromosome pairs, which include a single pair of sex chromosomes. A large X sex chromosome and a smaller Y sex chromosome determine male worms, while two X chromosomes determine female worms.

One of the three nonsex chromosomes is thought to have formed by a fusion event between two smaller chromosomes.

== Evolution ==
(Simplified phylogenetic tree of the genus Onchocerca.)

- - Dirofilaria
  - - Onchocerca flexuosa
    - - Onchocerca lupi
      - - - Onchocerca ochengi
          - Onchocerca volvulus
        - - Onchocerca gibsoni
          - - Onchocerca gutturosa
            - Onchocerca jakutensis

Onchocerca volvulus has low genetic variation between individuals. This suggests a population bottleneck occurred in the past that caused a rapid decrease in the population size. It also shows high haplotype diversity, which is a measure of how unique a group of linked genes is. This pattern of low genetic variation and high haplotype diversity suggests fast population expansion after a bottleneck and has led to the theory that a host shift event from cattle allowed O. volvulus to infect humans. This is also supported by genetic data that place O. ochengi (a cattle-infecting strain) as the sister group to O. volvulus.

== Immune response ==
Adult worms are found in nodules and are hidden from most components of the human immune system. Microfilariae are more vulnerable to attack by immune cells because they exit nodules to complete their lifecycle. O. volvulus can be detected by the immune system through the release of soluble antigens and antigens found on the surface of microfilariae and infective J_{3} juveniles. These antigens allow the immune system to detect the presence of a foreign organism in the body and trigger an immune response to clear infection.

The immune response involves raising antibodies (IgG, IgM and IgE type) that can react with soluble antigens released by Onchocerca volvulus. Opsonising antibodies that tag cells for destruction are also found against the infective J_{3} stage and microfilariae, but there is not enough evidence at the moment to say whether this is protective.

The antigens of O. volvulus are highly complex and show cross-reactivity with several other filarial worms. Little evidence indicates that antibodies made are specific to O. volvulus. However, after the age of 40, the number of parasites carried (the intensity of infection) decreases, suggesting that over time, some sort of protective immune response develops.

=== Modulation by Onchocerca volvulus ===
Microfilariae can also modulate the immune system to avoid destruction. The complement system is used to enhance the effect of antibodies and phagocytic cells, which engulf and destroy other cells. Microfilariae block this pathway by cleaving C3b—an important protein in this process—to form iC3b. iC3b cannot go on to activate the next step in the pathway and allows microfilariae to remain in the body with little to no attack by the immune system.

== Endosymbiotic relationship with Wolbachia ==
Onchocerca volvulus, along with most filarial nematodes, share an endosymbiotic relationship with strains of the bacterium Wolbachia. In the absence of Wolbachia, larval development of O. volvulus is disrupted or ceased. These bacteria have been proposed to enhance the symptoms and severity of onchocerciasis by triggering inflammatory responses in the host.
