= Sowda =

- Specialty: Dermatology

Sowda is a cutaneous condition, a localized type of onchocerciasis. This is mostly seen in patients with the disease from Yemen, Saudi Arabia, East and West Africa

== See also ==
- Skin lesion
