= Suah Koko =

Liberian indigenous ruler (c. 1850–c. 1934)

- Born: c. 1850
- Died: c. 1934
- Occupation: Chieftain

Suah Koko (also known as Suacoco, Madam Suakoko and Nye-Sua Coco) was an indigenous Liberian ruler who lived between the late 19th and early 20th century. She fought several battles against the expansionary Liberia Frontier Force before entering negotiations to grant accession of the territory she ruled over to the Liberian government. She later became a paramount chief and supplied porters to the Harvard Medical African Expedition (1926–1927).

== Biography ==
While the exact date of her birth is unknown, it is estimated that Suah Koko was born around 1850. She was likely born in Ngalensu, part of the former Kornyea-Komu District. Her name, "Koko", is an uncommon Kpelle name that is traditionally given to the fifth female child born to a mother in former French Guinea. After attending a Sande society initiation school, she was given the name "Suah" or "Suaa", which was shared with her mother and is also a title given to someone who has accomplished a noteworthy achievement in the Sande society. "Nye", an additional title, means "mother" in the Kpelle language and was used by her followers as a sign of respect.

Suah Koko ruled a polity in north central Liberia, including land within modern Bong County, which was governed from her residence at Suakoko. The territory was then known as "Kiayeah", or "area of the united people" in Kpelle, and was previously called "Kornyea-Komu", or "the hills area". In the early 20th century the Liberia government sought to expand its influence beyond the narrow 40-mile (64 km) strip over which it had previously ruled. This required making inroads into the "hinterland," which was ruled by the indigenous people. Chief Suah Koko fought several battles against the Liberia Frontier Force but eventually entered negotiations to provide her land to the Liberian government. Her land provided strategic access to other regions of the hinterland – an army barracks was constructed at Sergeant Kollile Ta, 2 mi (3.2 km) north of Suakoko and proved valuable during the subsequent conquest of the upper reaches of Bong County, Lofa County and Nimba County.

In 1926, Suah Koko met with Richard P. Strong of the Harvard Africa Expedition at Suakoko. At the time she was said to be the only female indigenous ruler in the country. Her age was estimated at 60–70 years.

In 1929, she was appointed a paramount chief – the first female to be so titled within the Central Province (Nimba, Bong and Lofa counties). Being almost blind, she ruled through her grandson. She sided with the government in its war with the Kpelle people.

Notably, she was one of the few Liberian national heroes who never converted to Christianity and continued to practice traditional African religion.

== Legacy ==
A district, chiefdom and clan are named in honor of Suah Koko, and her descendants granted more than 1,000 acres (400 ha) of land to the Cuttington University, which named a scholarship in her honour. However, in 2013, the program was suspended, which resulted in mass protests by students.

The Chief Suah Koko Center for Rural Women's Empowerment in Bong County was built by the Angie Brooks International Center for Women's Empowerment, Leadership Development, International Peace and Security. It was dedicated in June 2014 by Liberian President Ellen Johnson Sirleaf. It is located on Cuttington University's main campus.
