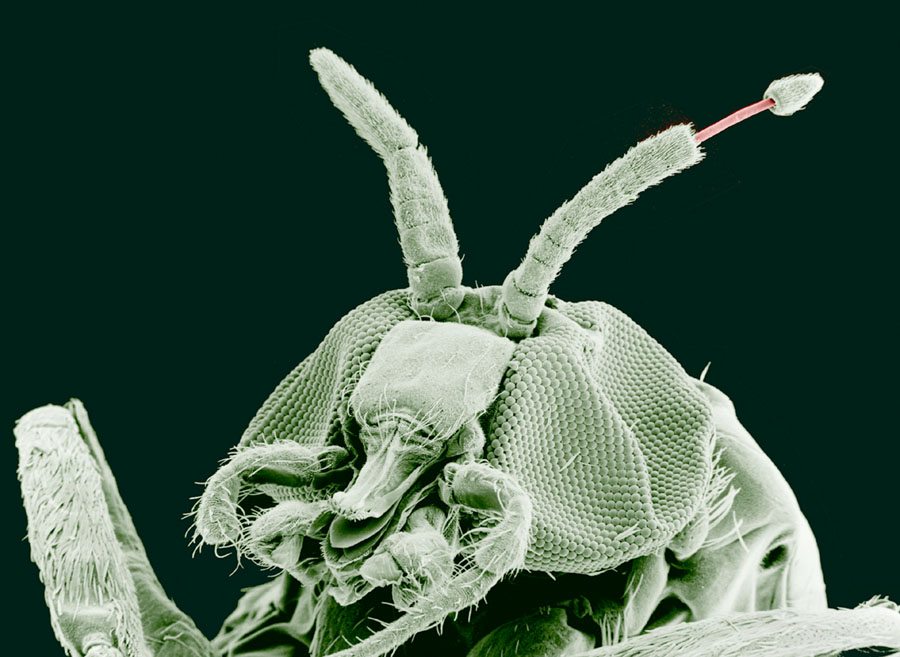
- Adult black fly with Onchocerca volvulus emerging from the insect's antenna

Scientific classification
- Kingdom: Animalia
- Phylum: Nematoda
- Class: Chromadorea
- Order: Rhabditida
- Family: Onchocercidae
- Genus: Onchocerca; Diesing, 1841

= Onchocerca =

Genus of roundworms

Onchocerca is a genus of parasitic roundworm. It contains one human parasite – Onchocerca volvulus – which is responsible for the neglected disease Onchocerciasis, also known as "river blindness" because the infected humans tend to live near rivers where host black flies live. Over 40 million people are infected in Africa, Central America, and South America. Other species affect cattle, horses, etc.

A few cases of zoonotic infections (cases in which parasites that normally infect animals also infect humans) have been reported in Japan for O. japonica and O. takaokai.

== List of species ==
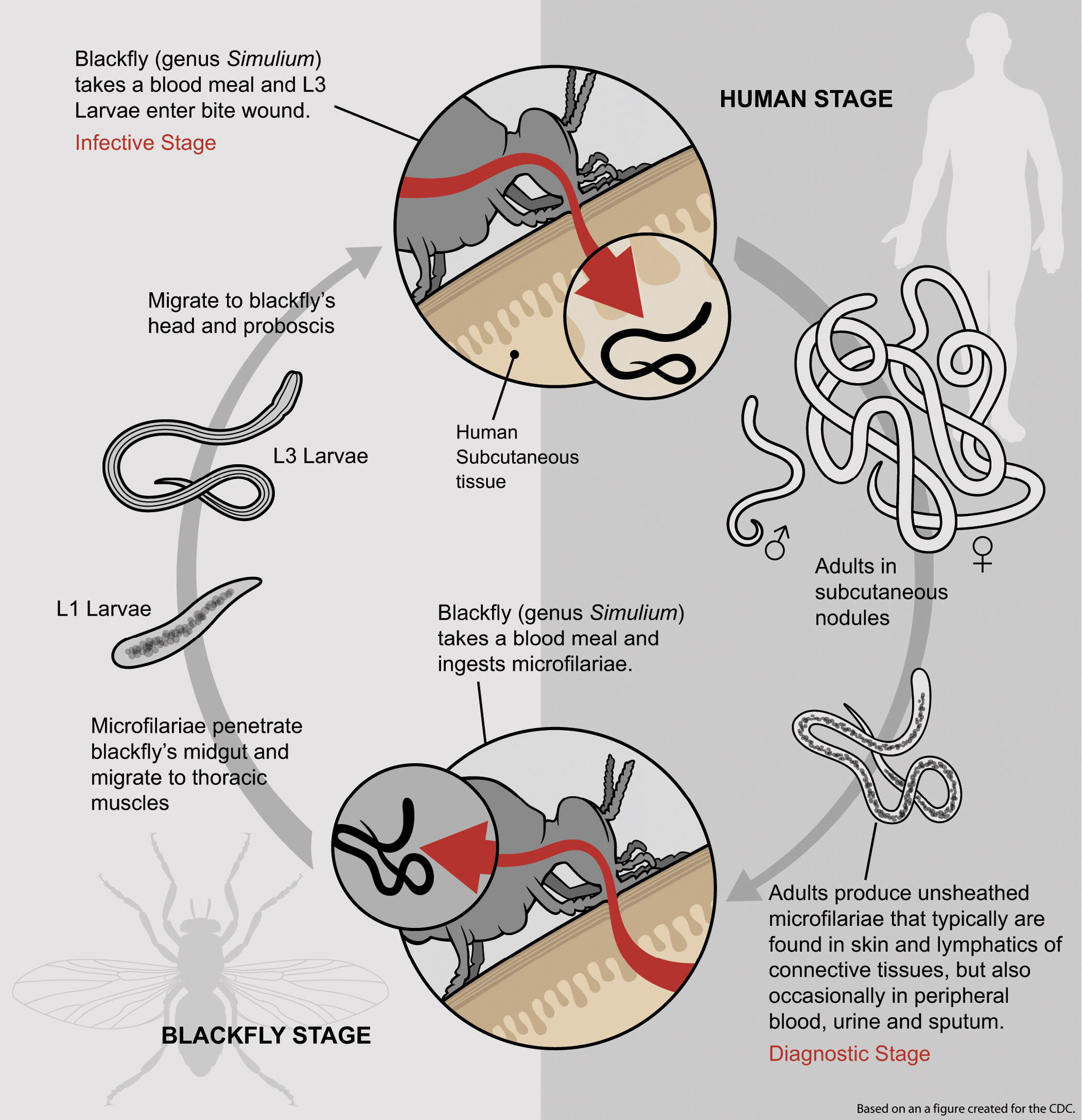
Life cycle of Onchocerca volvulus

- Onchocerca armillata
- Onchocerca cervicalis
- Onchocerca dukei
- Onchocerca fasciata
- Onchocerca flexuosa
- Onchocerca gibsoni
- Onchocerca gutturosa
- Onchocerca jakutensis
- Onchocerca linealis
- Onchocerca lupi
- Onchocerca ochengi
- Onchocerca ramachandrini
- Onchocerca takaokai
- Onchocerca tubingensis
- Onchocerca volvulus
