= Harvard Medical African Expedition (1926–1927) =

Coordinates: 6.246°N 10.660°W

The dotted lines marks the route taken by the Expedition

The Harvard Medical African Expedition of 1926–1927 was an eight-man venture sent by Harvard University for the primary purpose of conducting a medical and biological survey of Liberia; the secondary purpose being to then cross Africa from coast to coast - west to east - through the Belgian Congo (and other regions) so as to make a comparative study of their Liberian findings. Furthermore, the Liberian interior was next of kin to being terra incognita in the West, there having been no previous medical or scientific survey of the region, nor any recorded expedition into the Liberian hinterlands. The Expedition leader was Richard Pearson Strong (Harvard's first Professor of tropical medicine), with the others being zoologists Harold Jefferson Coolidge Jr. (Assistant Curator of Mammals at Harvard) and Dr. Glover Morrill Allen, entomologist Dr. Joseph Charles Bequaert, botanist and Washington University in St. Louis Professor David H. Linder, bacteriologist Dr. George C. Shattuck, bacteriologist Dr. Max Theiler, and Assistant Ornithologist Loring Whitman (also a Harvard medical student and photographer). The Expedition was a success and, while its "chief objective was the investigation of tropical diseases, many zoological specimens were collected and the customs of the native tribes were studied." The story of their travels back and forth across Liberia, and reports of the diseases found that ailed the inhabitants, animals and plants was published in the two-volume The African Republic of Liberia and the Belgian Congo: Based on the Observations Made and Material Collected during the Harvard African Expedition, 1926-1927 written by Dr. Strong in a partnership with other Expedition members and Harvard officials.

== Investigative purposes ==
While investigating tropical medicine, maladies, and wildlife along with general exploration was indeed the prime purpose of the Harvard Expedition, Dr. Strong noted two underlying political and economic reasons for the venture as well:

1. The political was that, being a former American colony and at the time the only African-governed republic in Africa, the United States had vested interest in Liberian affairs - acting as financial advisers to the country since the Treaty of Versailles.
2. Economically, the Firestone Tire and Rubber Company had obtained a 99-year lease for over a million acres in Liberia upon which they meant to grow rubber plantations to be managed by local workers. Hence Mr. Harvey S. Firestone had a keen interest in the "likely plant funguses, which could destroy rubber trees and cash crops, and tropical diseases, which plagued current and potential rubber plantation laborers." Indeed, while the Firestone Company's supportive role of the Expedition has always been downplayed, reviews made since have uncovered noted and financial and material assistance to the group during their journey.

However, it was the geographical element that overlaid the entire venture as Liberian interior was all but entirely unknown to the West - meaning the Dr. Strong and his company had to make the maps as they journeyed; for the current ones, they found, were grossly inaccurate: "The greater part of the country has not been surveyed from a geographical standpoint, and most of the prominent features are inaccurately placed on the various maps obtainable ... The sources and courses of rivers, the heights of mountains, and the situations and positions of towns are usually hypothetical. We found that names of the great majority of the towns and villages in the interior, inscribed on the published maps were unknown to the inhabitants of the regions concerned." As such, the Medical Expedition had many eyes upon it as it would inform not only medical and zoological research, but also anthropological and geological along with government and business views on Liberia regarding the current status of the country.

== Meeting with Chief Suah Koko ==
Arriving in the Liberian capital of Monrovia, Dr. Strong and co. began by settling permits, route issues, and meeting dignitaries. Then, with such logistical concerns settled by the beginning of August and after making brief ventures to collect specimens in the adjacent countryside, they proceeded up the Du river to the first three Firestone Plantations before journeying into the hinterlands that, effectively, were not wholly under the control of the central government. The Expedition's goal being Gbarnga - then called Gbanga - (where they intended to and eventually did establish their base camp), they traversed many towns and villages en route. However, while the Expedition encountered and observed many African tribes during and following this stage of their journey, one of their most historically noted meetings occurred in the beginning of September just before they arrived in Gbanga. This encounter being with the famed Paramount tribal chief Suah Koko of Suakoko, a formidable woman whose estimated age was 60-70 said was said to be the only female chief in the country. Spending a few nights in her domain, the Westerners describe Chief Suah Koko as, despite her age and near blindness, displaying "surprising intelligence in her conversation and [that she is] apparently feared, respected, and obeyed in her community." Indeed, while peace currently reigned, the Harvard Expedition noted signs of her previous war with the Liberian Frontier Force in the heavily fortified compound that was her home; a peace that Chief Suah Koko had previously and successfully negotiated with the Liberian government. Hence her importance not just in Liberian politics, but also to the Expeditior - for she ruled a strategic region in that it served as a key crossing point into the Liberian hinterlands; indeed, "without her permission and without her generosity, the Harvard expedition could not have traveled further to Gbanga and beyond." A charge that the chief managed quite well, for Dr. Strong notes in his book that "her province was apparently well governed, and all the promises which she made while we in the community, and in response to our requests, chiefly relating to the sales of food, to transportation, and the examination of her people were kept." However, a slight yet harmless culture clash occurred between the Westerners and the Chief - one owed to the fact that the chief was a woman. In sum, knowing that gaining the local rulers' favor was necessary for the success of the Expedition, Dr. Strong showered them with gifts consisting mainly of gin and tobacco. But, as the Professor notes in his diary:

She wished to shake hands. I presented her with a powder puff case and mirror and a small bottle of scent. She seemed pleased with these [gifts] but said she hoped we had some gin and tobacco and that she was particularly glad to see us because she believed we had these articles. As a matter of fact all our trade gin is behind us. I gave the last two bottles of it I had with some tobacco and a tin of beef and a box of sardines to the Chief and Inspector of Zeanshu as a dash. However we will give the old lady some tobacco when she furnishes us with porters as she has promised to do, and I will leave word for George to give her some gin.

Chief Suah Koko was as good as her word for, while the Medical Expedition had had difficulty throughout their Liberian journeys in securing the help of porters, Chief Suah Koko was instrumental in providing them. Indeed, while the Expedition members stay with the famed Chief was brief, the hospitality and aid she offered them made her a meeting with her an important event.

== Documentation and legacy ==
Harvard Medical African Expedition was a success with countless specimens collected and the customs of tribes such as Suah Koko's and those of the Gbanga and beyond Liberia in the Congo recorded. Furthermore, the photography endeavors of Loring Whitman yielded many photos ranging from local wildlife to the everyday dress and activities of the tribes, to the flesh-eating and twisting diseases whose study was the primary purpose of the venture - all, and the details of which, are printed, explained, and analyzed in Dr. Strong's two-volume The African Republic of Liberia and the Belgian Congo: Based on the Observations Made and Material Collected during the Harvard African Expedition, 1926-1927. Furthermore, Harold Coolidge brought back a large gorilla that is still on display at the Harvard Museum of Comparative Zoology, and, in 1929, he published A revision of the genus Gorilla, which forms the basis of the modern taxonomy of the genus Gorilla. The legacy of the Medical Expedition is twofold: at the time and as noted by Dr. Strong, the Expedition's return prompted the United States to take steps to rectify the unsanitary conditions observed in Monrovia and, in addition, "there has been much publicity and interest taken in connection with the opportunities offered by Mr. Harvey S. Firestone. However, the ultimate legacy of the venture is, like the gorilla, the lasting accumulation and possession of knowledge and specimens for study across many fields.
