= Erisipela de la costa =

- Specialty: Dermatology/infectious diseases

Erisipela de la costa is an acute phase of onchocerciasis characterized by swelling of the face with erythema and itching. Onchocerciasis causes different kinds of skin changes and these changes vary in different geographic regions. This skin change, erisípela de la costa, of acute onchocerciasis is most commonly seen among victims in Central and South America.

== See also ==
- List of cutaneous conditions
