= David H. Linder =

American mycologist (1899–1946)

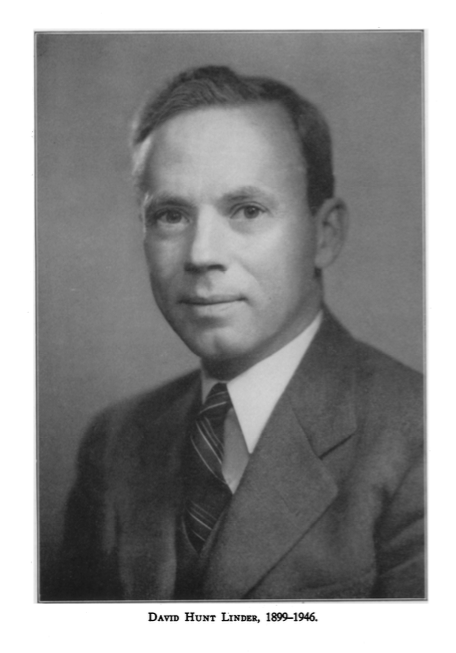
Portrait of David Hunt Linder (1899–1946)

David Hunt Linder (1899–1946) was an American mycologist known for his work on the Helicosporous fungi and his dedication to advancing mycological knowledge. He curated the Farlow Herbarium of Cryptogamic Botany at Harvard University and founded the highly respected journal Farlowia.

== Personal life ==
David Hunt Linder was born in Brookline, Massachusetts, on September 24, 1899. Early on in his life, he and his family moved to Canton, Massachusetts. He spent most of childhood surrounded by science and nature, since his parents owned an observatory, a greenhouse, and gardens of many flowers and vegetables.

In 1928, Linder married his first wife, Elinor Alberts, who was an orchidologist at Missouri Botanical Garden.

After Elinor died in 1938, Linder sold the house in Canton, married Dorothy Flannegan, and moved to a new house in Wakefield, Massachusetts.

Linder died on November 10, 1946, at the age of 47.

== Education ==
Linder obtained his early education at the Noble and Greenough School for Boys in Dedham, Massachusetts.

In 1917, Linder entered Harvard College in Cambridge, Massachusetts, and received his B.A. degree four years later. By then, he had already started learning about mycology and corresponding with Dr. William Gilson Farlow. During World War I, he served as a chemist in the Student Army Training Corps.

In 1921, Linder began his graduate studies in mycology and graduated a year later. Upon receiving his M.A., Linder was awarded the Sheldon Travelling Fellowship that allowed him to explore British and Dutch Guiana, and parts of the British West Indies. This trip resulted in Linder's strong passions for the tropics.

From 1922 to 1926, Linder continued his mycological studies by gaining a Ph.D. under the supervision of two prominent mycologists, Dr. Roland Thaxter and Dr. William H. Weston Jr. Upon graduation, Linder went to Liberia on the Harvard African Expedition. He became quite ill afterwards due to the physical strain of the expedition.

== Career ==
After his return from Africa, Linder started his career as an instructor at the Henry Shaw School of Botany at George Washington University and a mycologist at the Missouri Botanical Garden. In 1928, Linder was promoted to assistant professor of botany at the Henry Shaw School of Botany.

In 1931, he returned to Harvard University and became an instructor in Cryptogamic Botany. He also assisted one of his mentors, Dr. Weston, at the Biological Laboratories. The following year, he began to work as a curator at Harvard's Farlow Herbarium.

In 1939, Linder and his assistant, Hilda Harris, started assembling a card index of 2335 pictures of botanists and mycologists ranging from group photographs to formal portraits.

In 1943, Linder founded Farlowia, a prestigious quarterly journal that included articles up to 100 pages, exclusively on non-vascular cryptograms, fungi, and the history of botany.

== Contributions to mycology ==
Collections: Linder added about 200,000 specimens to the Farlow Herbarium. Important collections included the Bartholomew Fungi, the Sprague Lichens, Mrs. E. B. Blackford's fungi, and Miss Lizzie Allen's paintings of higher fungi, etc. He issued the exsiccata series Reliquiae Farlowianae (1934–1946).

Publications: Linder produced almost 150 scientific papers on cryptogamic plants and fungi. The most prominent one was probably the monograph of the Helicospous fungi imperfecti This article contains a total of 161 pages and 31 illustrative plates. Clearly, Linder spent a lot of time describing and illustrating fungal species and genera of this group, all of which produce helicore spores, hence the name Helicosporous fungi. Linder published work on other types of fungi as well, such as those from the genera Myxomycidium, Rhizopogon, and Schizophyllum.

Descriptions: Of the fungi kingdom, Linder described one new family: Kickxellaceae, 16 new genera, and 170 new species. He also drew a large number of mycological illustrations.

== Honors ==
Several fungal taxa have been named in honor of David Hunt Linder including; Linderiella G. Cunn., (now a synonym of Clathrus P.Micheli ex L.) Linderomyces Singer, (now a synonym of Gloeocantharellus Singer), Aplosporella linderae (Peck) Petr., and Circinella linderi Hesselt. & Fennell. (now a synonym of Fennellomyces linderi (Hesselt. & Fennell) Benny & R.K.Benj.

Linder was appointed Secretary-Treasurer of Mycological Society of America in 1936–1938, Vice President in 1939, and President in 1940. He was elected a Fellow of the American Association for the Advancement of Science in 1931. He also served as secretary of the American Society of Plant Taxonomists and was a member of the Torrey Botanical Club, the New England Botanical Club, and the British Mycological Society.

== Interesting facts ==
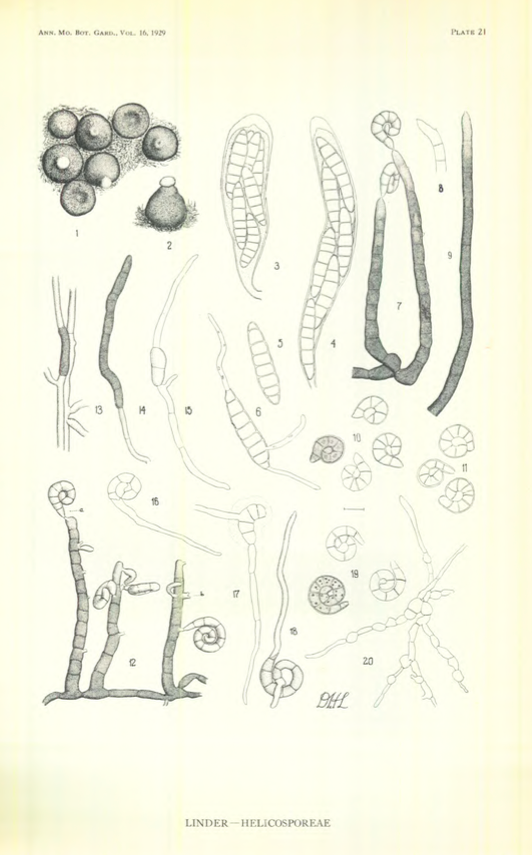
Example of Linder's illustrations of fungi
