= Onchocerca lupi =

Scientific classification
- Kingdom: Animalia
- Phylum: Nematoda
- Class: Chromadorea
- Order: Rhabditida
- Family: Onchocercidae
- Genus: Onchocerca
- Species: O. lupi

Binomial name
- Onchocerca lupi Rodonaja, 1967

Species of roundworm

Onchocerca lupi is a nematode that causes ocular onchocerciasis, an eye disease, in canines and felines. The parasite was first described in 1967 in a wolf from Georgia. The other Onchocerca spp., O. volvulus, is a human parasite that causes ocular onchocerciasis in human and affects 37 million people globally.

The male O. lupi worms are smaller in size than the females. Males are 43–50 mm in length and 120-200 μm in diameter. Females are 275-420 μm in diameter but the total length are unknown while the longest fragments recorded were 160–165 mm. They both are fragile and slender.

== Life cycle ==
The complete life cycle of O. lupi is still unknown. The black fly, Simulium tribulatum, is reported as a putative vector.

== Human cases ==
The number of reported human zoonotic O. lupi infections is increasing. The first human case was reported in Turkey. The worm was removed from the subconjunctival region of the left eye of an 18-year-old girl who was experiencing pain and had the history of a fly-bite on her left upper eyelid. The morphology and molecular analysis of its partial cox1 and 12S ribosomal DNA sequences were studied to identify. The additional cases have been documented in Turkey, Tunisia, Iran and the USA.

In the first reported case from USA, the infection site was unusual from all the previous cases and was found in a cervical spine of a 22-month-old girl. The magnetic resonance imaging (MRI) scan revealed that a soft tissue mass was running from C2 through C4. The left unilateral laminectomy was performed and a small biopsy of the mass was taken. The biopsy showed a mature female worm was present. It was suspected that the biopsy process might have killed the worm because the mass reduced in size. The seven-week follow-up revealed that the patient got better.
