= Caroline Bingham =

American botanist

Caroline Priscilla Bingham
- Known for: Discovery of several new species of algae
- Scientific career
- Fields: Botanist

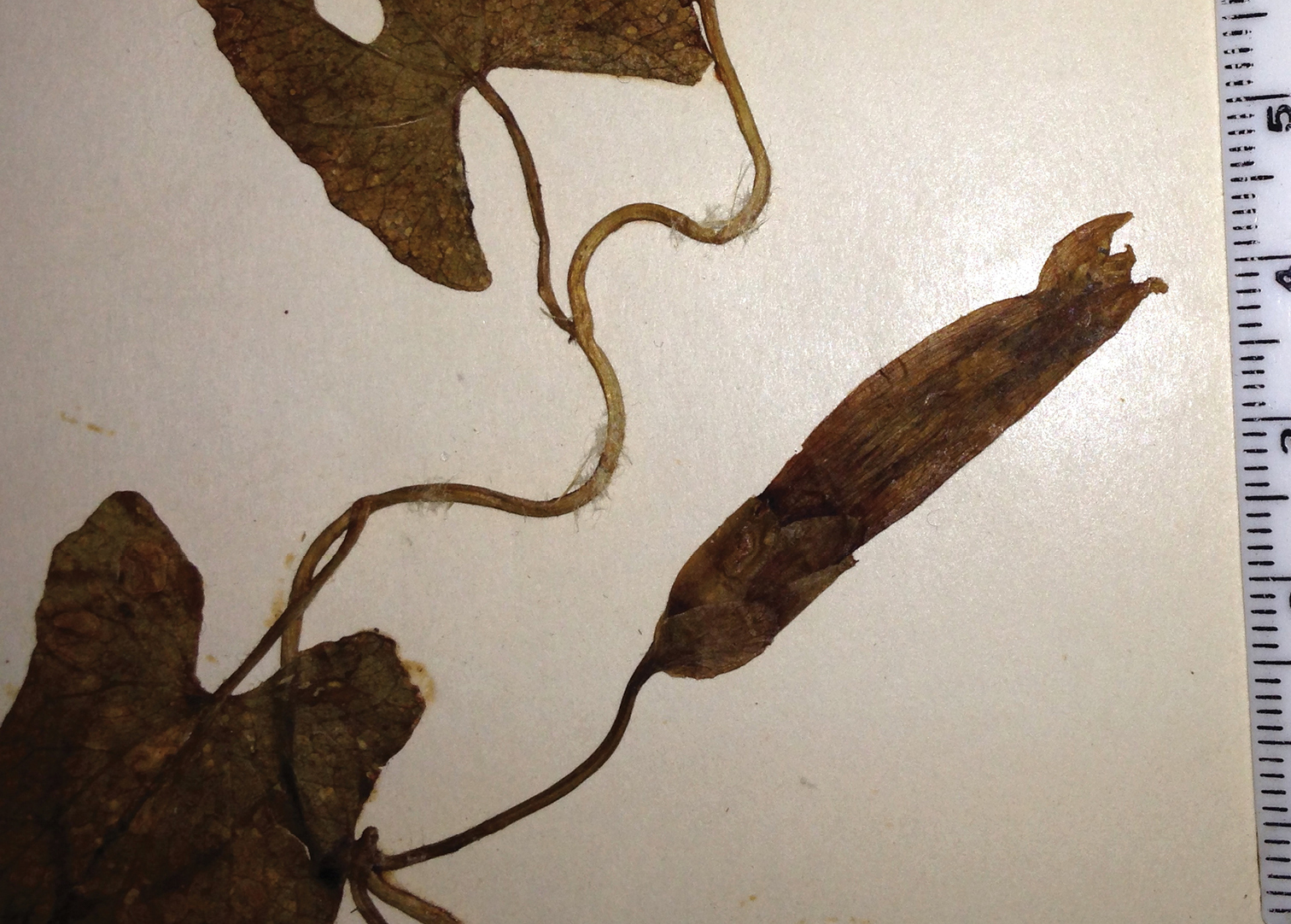
Lectotype of Convolvulus binghamiae. Image of specimen collected by Caroline Bingham. Image by M. Provance & A. Sanders

Caroline Priscilla Bingham (née Lord, 1831–1932) was an American botanist who was one of the earliest American women to publish scientific papers on botany. She was an influential collector of botanical specimens discovering a new genus and several new species. As a result of her discoveries Bingham had a genus and several algae species named in her honor.

== Biography ==
=== Early life and marriage ===
Bingham was born in 1831 in Pennsylvania. She and her family shifted to Ohio around 1836. She married her husband, Richard Fitch Bingham in Ohio and subsequently the couple moved to California in 1873. At around this time she took up the study of botany.

=== Botany work ===
Bingham was one of the earliest American women to publish a scientific paper on botany. She is one of only six American women listed in the London Royal Society Catalogue of Science Papers 1800 - 1900 whose journal articles predate 1880. Her first known article was published in the Botanical Gazette in 1879.

Bingham was a member of the Santa Barbara Natural History Society and held the position of Secretary of the Society. She was also a member of the publication committee for the Bulletin of the Santa Barbara Society and published an article in that journal in March 1887.

As well as publishing papers on her botany work Bingham collaborated with botanists such as Alpheus Hervey, William Gilson Farlow and Jacob Georg Agardh. Bingham assisted their work by providing specimens, lists of plants she collected, notes on special habitat, seasons of growth and frequency of appearance.

Bingham also corresponded with Joseph Dalton Hooker at the Royal Botanical Gardens, Kew on botanical matters.

Her specimens continue to be studied and are held at various herbaria including the United States National Herbarium, the Gray Herbarium, the Steere Herbarium of the New York Botanical Garden, the University of Notre Dame herbarium, the University of California herbarium, the California Academy of Sciences herbarium and the Farlow Herbarium at Harvard University

=== Death ===
Her husband died in 1895 and she subsequently moved to New Bedford where she died aged 101.

== Published works ==
- Bingham, R. F., (1879), "Common and troublesome weeds near Santa Barbara", California Botanical Gazette, Vols 3 and 4, p. 226
- Bingham, R. F. (1887). "Flora near Santa Barbara". Botanical Gazette. 12 (2): 33–35. doi:10.1086/326074. S2CID 84573691.
- Bingham, R. F. (1887). "An American Papaver". Botanical Gazette. 12 (3): 67. doi:10.1086/326091.
- Bingham, R. F. (1890). "Medicinal Plants growing wild in Santa Barbara and vicinity". Bulletin of the Santa Barbara Society of Natural History. 1 (2): 34–37.

== Eponymous taxa ==
Bingham had the algal genus Binghamia named after her along with several algae species including Dictyota binghamiae, Endarachne binghamiae, Gigartina binghamiae and Leptocladia binghamiae
