= Mermaid's glove =

Mermaid's glove is a common name referring to two different organisms:

- Dictyota binghamiae, a seaweed
- Haliclona oculata, a sponge
