= William Gilson Farlow =

American botanist (1844–1919)

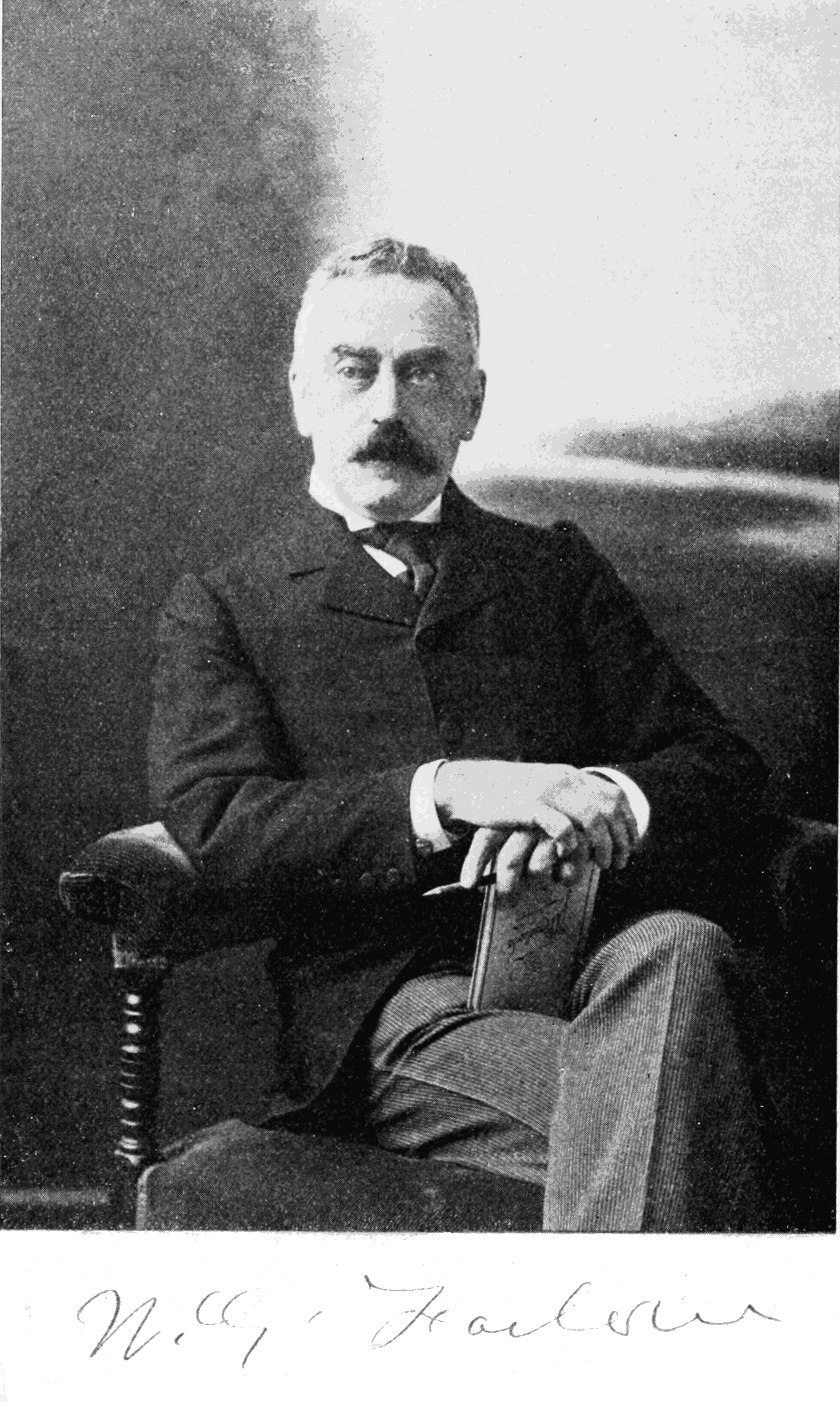
- Born: December 17, 1844; Boston, Massachusetts, US
- Died: June 3, 1919 (aged 74); Cambridge, Massachusetts, US
- Education: Harvard University
- Known for: Phytopathology
- Scientific career
- Fields: Botany
- Academic advisors: Asa Gray, Heinrich Anton de Bary
- Doctoral students: William Albert Setchell
- Author abbrev. (botany): Farl.

William Gilson Farlow (December 17, 1844 – June 3, 1919) was an American botanist, mycologist, and professor at Harvard University for more than 40 years. Farlow conducted groundbreaking research on plant pathology, taught the first plant pathology course in the United States, and co-founded the journal Annals of Botany.

== Early life and education ==
Farlow was born on December 17, 1844, in Boston, Massachusetts. His parents were Boston businessman John Smith Farlow and Nancy Wight Blanchard. He attended the Quincy Grammar School and the English High School in Boston, followed by a year at Boston Latin School. From childhood he reportedly aspired to a career in botany.

Farlow attended Harvard University (A.B., 1866), where he studied with Professor Asa Gray and served as student president of the Harvard Natural History Society. He earned his M.D. from Harvard Medical School in 1870, studying with Jeffries Wyman. From 1870 to 1872, he worked on the collections of cryptogams at the Gray Herbarium, again under the supervision of Professor Gray. In 1872 he went to Europe, studying algae and fungi at the University of Strasbourg under the tutelage of Heinrich Anton de Bary. He went on to study lichens with Johannes Müller Argoviensis in Geneva, Switzerland, and study marine algae with Gustave Thuret and Édouard Bornet in Antibes, France.

== Scientific career ==
In 1874, Farlow returned to Harvard and, with the support of Professor Gray, received an appointment as an assistant professor of botany at the Bussey Institution in 1874. He became Professor of Cryptogamic Botany from 1879 until his death 40 years later. Farlow retired from undergraduate teaching in 1896 but continued to advise graduate students, collect specimens, and conduct research. He willed his herbarium and library to Harvard, where they form the Farlow Herbarium of Cryptogamic Botany. Farlow's obituaries recognized him as the "father" of cryptogamic botany in the United States. He published dozens of scientific articles, reports, and conference papers. In 1895, Farlow played a leading part in the creation of the New England Botanical Club, hosting a meeting at his Cambridge, Massachusetts home to discuss forming an organization devoted to the study of the local flora. After the club was established, he served as its first president. Through his teaching, publications, and help with specimen identifications, he also encouraged a circle of professional and amateur botanists whose work on algae, bryophytes, lichens, and fungi appeared in the early volumes of Rhodora.

Farlow also built the collections that later formed the core of the Farlow Library and Herbarium of Cryptogamic Botany. Among the major collections he acquired were the herbaria of Moses Ashley Curtis and Edward Tuckerman, which together amounted to more than 60,000 specimens. He also preserved sets of exsiccatae as intact published units rather than breaking them up, recognizing their taxonomic and bibliographic value.

One of Farlow's later studies, on the chestnut blight fungus, has been described as strikingly modern in method. Drawing on published literature and comparative study of herbarium material, including European exsiccatae, he used specimens to assess the identity and probable origin of the pathogen and to reconsider its classification.

Among his students was the phytologist William Albert Setchell. He corresponded with other botanists such as Caroline Bingham and Jacob Georg Agardh and collaborated in the identification and classification of species of algae previously unknown to science. Two genera, the algae Farlowia and the fungus Farlowiella, were named in his honor in 1876 and 1891, along with numerous species of algae, fungi, and lichens.

Farlow travelled to Campobello Island in 1898 and 1902 to study its algae, but was unimpressed by its inaccessibility and instead recorded its fungi and lichens.

Farlow was elected to the American Academy of Arts and Sciences in 1874. He served as president of the American Society of Naturalists in 1899, president of the National Academy of Sciences in 1904, president of the American Association for the Advancement of Science in 1905, and president of the Botanical Society of America in 1911. He was also a member of the American Philosophical Society, a fellow of the Linnaean Society of London, and a member of the Paris Academy of Science.

He received honorary doctoral degrees from Harvard University (LL.D, 1896), the University of Glasgow (LL.D, 1901), the University of Wisconsin–Madison (LL.D, 1904), and Uppsala University (Ph.D., 1907). He was elected to honorary membership of the Manchester Literary and Philosophical Society on April 30, 1898.

== Personal life ==
On June 10, 1900, Farlow married Lilian Horsford (1848–1927), daughter of Harvard chemistry professor Eben Norton Horsford. After their marriage, Lilian Horsford Farlow became an active partner in many of his scientific activities. She traveled with him to scientific meetings and also collected algal and fungal specimens.

== Taxon named in his honor ==
- The Catfish genus Farlowella R. S. Eigenmann & C. H. Eigenmann 1889 was named after him.

== Publications ==
Among Farlow's publications are:

- The Gymnosporangia or Cedar-Apples of the United States (1880)
- Marine Algœ of New England (1881)
- A Provisional Host-Index of the Fungi of the United States (1888)
- Biographical Index of North American Fungi (1905)

With Charles Lewis Anderson and Daniel Cady Eaton he issued the exsiccata series Algae exsiccatae Americae Borealis (1877–1889).

Between 1922 and 1946 the Farlow Herbarium distributed the exsiccata Reliquiae Farlowianae. Cryptogams distributed by the Farlow Herbarium of Harvard University, the first part edited by Roland Thaxter (no. 1–600), followed up by David H. Linder (no. 601–1000).
