= Jean Hissette =

Belgian ophthalmologist (1888-1965)

Jean Hissette (30 August 1888 – 26 August 1965) was a Belgian ophthalmologist.

Hissette was born in Leuven. In 1930, he became the first to discover African River Blindness, a severe eye disease occurring in people affected by onchocerciasis, a filarial worm infection. Onchocerciasis had already been known for a long time, but until 1930 no other specialist in tropical diseases had ever identified severely afflicted blind people anywhere in Africa. Hissette discovered several thousand victims along the Sankuru river in Belgian Congo, and so became the first one to identify this strain of the disease.

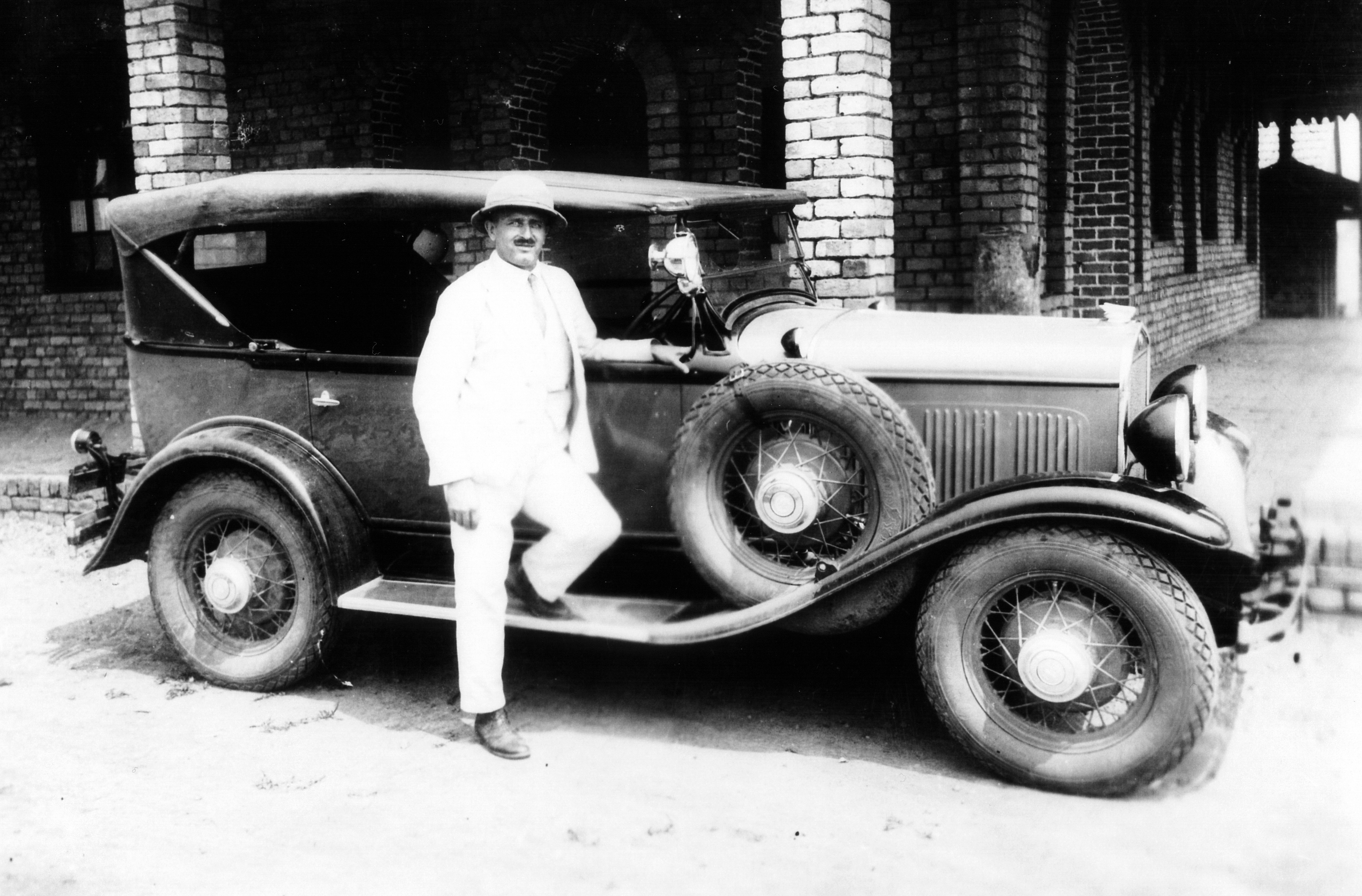
Dr. Jean Hissette in Thielen-Saint Jacques around 1930

== Biography ==
=== Born and grown up in Leuven, Belgium ===
On 30 August 1888, Philippe Jean Hissette was born in Louvain as the third child of Jeanne Catherine Wouters (1855–1936) and the mining engineer, Louis Hissette (1858–1888). Four months before the birth his father had died at the age of 30. Philippe Jean had two brothers, Louis-Ferdinand (1885–1972) and Jean-Baptiste (1886–1887). After her husband, Louis Hissette, had died, Jeanne Catherine remarried to Joseph Pieraerts in 1892. Jean, as he was called visited Schools in Louvain and in Melle, Ghent. From 1908 until 1909 he was recruited for the military service. After that he began to study medicine in Louvain.

=== WWI ===
When the First World War broke out in 1914 Jean Hissette was still a medicine student and had spent his July vacations in Lacuisine. On 1 August 1914, mobilization day, he left Lacuisine for the duration of the war. During the First World War and after the war had ended, Jean performed four years of military service as a medically adorned sanitary officer in the medical service unit of the 1st division of the Belgian Army. He was mainly deployed in the front line against the Germans at the Yser.

=== Florenville ===
In 1919 he passed his state examination at the University of Ghent. Later the same year he married the anversoise Hilda de Vriendt (old Flemish painter family) and at this point he settled as a private doctor and obstetrician in the independent practice in Florenville-sur-Semois en Gaume, Rue d’Orval Nr.7. Hissette was not very busy because there were a total of four practising physicians. During this time he also visited the eye clinic of Ghent’s university, which was run by van Duyse, on a regular basis. Soon after, he visited his colleagues and doctor friends, de Mets and Moorkens, in Antwerp to continue his education in ophthalmology. On the farms around Florenville he collected eyes of pigs to train on. In quick succession his five children were born, Madeleine, the oldest (*1920), Marguerite (1922–2002), Marie Thérèse (*1923), Gabrielle (1925–1983) and his son George (1926–1988).

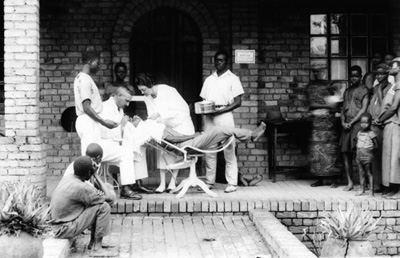
Dr. Jean Hissette and his nurse Mademoiselle de Salmon assisting him with a cataract operation outdoors at Thielen-Saint Jacques, Kasai in the Belgian Congo, 1930

=== The family Hissette decided to move into the Belgian Congo ===
They did not have much money and in 1928, at the age of 40, Jean and his wife Hilda decided to move into the Belgian Congo with the Belgian National Mission. On 27 February 1929, Hilda, Jean and their two youngest children boarded the ‘Anversville’ in Antwerp. Passing the Matadi Harbour on their way they moved to the Scheutist missionary station (Mission nationale) in Thielen-Saint Jacques in Kasai (Belgian Congo). The three older children stayed in Belgium for their school education.

Although Hissette came to the Congo as a general practitioner his real interest was his specialisation in ophthalmology. With approval of the emissive mission in Thielen-Saint Jacques he set up an ophthalmological centre and straight away conducted eye surgery. Nevertheless, he did not neglect his function as a general practitioner for tropical medicines, nor as obstetrician and carer for newborns. On the Scheutist missionary station l’A.M.M. (l’Aide Médicale aux Missions) it was his task to take on the medical service. In June 1929 the Belgian nurse, Mademoiselle de Salmon, followed him. The space in the hospital was so tiny that Hissette preferred to operate out on the terrace (Fig.1).

Hissette made an effort to gain the trust of the sick people, he showed great compassion for distress and suffering in people regardless of whether they were black or white. After about one and a half years an attentive priest led him to the discovery of his lifetime: In September 1930, he discovers the first people in Africa affected by river blindness at the Sankuru and Lomami River in the Belgian Congo (Kluxen2011). A year after the initial discovery he undertakes another expedition to the same region to complete his scientific investigations which he includes in his famous work from 1932 (Hissette 1932).

=== Return to Congo ===
After receiving further qualifications and becoming equipped with some privileges from the colonial ministry in Brussels he returns to the Congo without his family as a qualified ophthalmologist. In October 1932, he travels via Tunis and Egypt into the Sudan and arrives in the Northeast of the Belgian Congo Colony at the end of the year. Here he also discovers a foyer of ocular onchocerciasis at the Uéle. In the year 1933 he is still in Thielen-Saint Jacques but only for a short time until he leaves the Scheutists to establish a dispensary for eye patients in Elisabethville. His family followed him to Elisabethville (Lubumbashi) in 1934/1935 where the children had the opportunity for an accredited school education.

In July 1934, as an advisor and guide, he attends the Harvard African Expedition under R. P. Strong to research the onchocerciasis along the Sankuru. In 1938 the results were published in a supplement of the American Journal for Tropical Medicine (Strong 1938, Hissette 1938). His reputation as an ophthalmologist grows to such an extent that patients even come from the neighbouring colonies to be consulted.

In June 1936, Hissette presented a slide show in London and became a Fellow of the Royal Society of Tropical Medicines and Hygiene. On 18 July 1936 he exhibited his aquarelles on the pathology of ocular onchocerciasis at the Colonial exhibition in Brussels (l’Institut royal colonial belge, l’actuelle Académie royale des Sciences d’Outre-mer) and also published them in the Collection des Mémoires de l’Institut (Hissette 1937). Amongst the aquarelles there is one picture of a typical chorioretinitis of the African ocular onchocerciasis, which creates blotchy scars (Hissette 1937, Hissette 1938). In 1937, he investigates the ocular complications of a measles epidemic in the colonial M’Pweto Region. Due to measles and a concurrent vitamin A deficiency spontaneous double-sided cornea perforations and blindness were caused in many children. At the beginning of the Second World War Hissette was appointed the position of the provincial doctor in Katanga. In 1952 he and his wife returned to Belgium. Around the same time he fell seriously ill and never really recovered from it, making it impossible for him to ever work in the medical field again. In the first few years the couple stayed in Lacuisine-sur-Semois but soon moved to an apartment in Brussels. Jean died in Brussels on 26 August 1965. He and his wife are buried in a family grave in Lacuisine, Florenville.

=== Onchocerciasis in Africa and Central America before 1930 ===
The first persons to mention ocular onchocerciasis were Rodolfo Robles and Rafael Pacheco Luna in Guatemala in 1915/1916 (Pacheco Luna 1918, Robles 1917, Grove 1990). Ophthalmic symptoms and signs were marked in the Triassic, also known as “Morbus Robles”: 1. Filarial worm infection of an adult Onchocerca in America, 2. Erisipela de la costa, an oedema of the face, 3. Conjunctivitis and iritis of the anterior segment of the eye. The early investigators of onchocerciasis from 1874-1930 in Africa made no mention at all of concomitant severe eye disease. Publications of the observations in Central America by Rodolfo Robles and Émile Brumpt in 1917/1919 (Brumpt 1919, Robles 1919) prompted some specialists in tropical medicine to look for eye disease associated with African onchocerciasis. But nobody described any eye involvement leading to blindness.

And then, in 1930, Hissette discovered thousands of people with river blindness along the Sankuru in Africa. He demonstrated the pathomechanism of the blindness during his first home leave in Belgium in 1932, when he found microfilariae in various tissues of an enucleated eye that he had brought home with him from the Sankuru: among other injurious effects, these microfilariae cause the severe eye inflammation. His special observational skill and his intuitive grasp of causalities meant that his descriptions were very precise. He described the chorioretinitical scarring of the fundus in onchocerciasis (Hissette 1932). Despite the fact that Ridley's description followed only thirteen years later in 1945 (Ridley 1945), the atrophic flecked retina was referred to simply as "Ridley fundus". Now it is more appropriated called “Hissette-Ridley fundus”. And he found that living microfilariae elicited no or only a very slight reaction in the anterior chamber of the eye, whereas dead ones provoked a strong inflammation. According to the “Zeitgeist” (spirit of the age) Hissette thought that the latter reaction was probably due to the brisk release of the toxins of the disintegrated parasites. This is not the fact, but research has identified the cause. The very strong inducers of the immune responses are endosymbionts (bacteria called Wolbachia). It has now become increasingly clear that Wolbachia play the major role in the pathogenesis of ocular onchocerciasis (river blindness) in the human host (Saint André et al. 2002).

=== The Harvard African Expedition ===
The Harvard African Expedition of 1934 had been arranged and paid for by the Belgian colonial administration. This proves that the expedition indeed had been a control commission assigned to check Hissette’s findings on the blind people because they were doubted. Hissette had never mentioned that he was checked. Strong had been urged by the colonial administration to keep silent about the assignment and in 1938 he had hoped to distract from this by writing that the expedition had been entirely his idea. It was feared that the public would have seen the considerable costs of the expedition as a waste since upon their return the Americans confirmed all of Hissette’s published findings about ocular affection through onchocerciasis. By no means had Hissette been displeased with the commission, instead he had felt honoured that such renowned tropical scientists showed an interest in his work. If the colonial administration had trusted Hissette, the commission and the “Harvard African Expedition” would have been dispensable.

Confronted in 1934 by a commission in the form of the Harvard African Expedition, Hissette traveled once more to the Sankuru with the Americans as the seventh member of the expedition and showed them "his" river blindness patients. Richard Pearson Strong was Professor of Tropical Medicine of Harvard University Medical School. His opinion was greatly respected in Tropical Medicine circles. The Americans sailed from Antwerp and disembarked, after a voyage of sixteen days, on the west coast of Africa at Lobito Bay (Angola). The expedition proceeded eastward from Lobito by rail for four days to the city of Elisabethville, now known as Lubumbashi. The train journey was continued, now accompanied by Dr. Jean Hissette. They travelled in a north-westerly direction for nearly three days to the village of Luputa, then by car and truck to the village of Kabinda, then further northward to the village of Pania Mutombo on the Sankuru-Lubilash River. This was exactly the same way Hissette had taken in 1930. Members of the expedition were Jack Sandground, helminthologist, Joseph Bequaert, entomologist, and Henry Mallinckrodt, photographer. The first headquarters was established in the village of Kassende, Lusambo. Hissette arranged for the blind people to be brought from the surrounding villages to the expedition’s headquarters after an arrangement between the chiefs of the villages there and himself. The great prevalence of disturbances of vision in association with onchocercal infection was by far the most striking clinical phenomena observed in this region. In Kassende multiple tumours, small sized nodules, were present; cases from 25 to 100 or more nodules were not uncommon. The Harvard African expedition of 1934 finally confirmed all the observations on river blindness caused by onchocerciasis (Strong 1938) that had already been communicated by Hissette (Hissette 1932). Hissette’s findings prompted renewed efforts to find ocular complications of onchocerciasis in other parts of Africa. Hissette was really able to help only a few of these blind people in 1934. In some cases, he succeeded in attaining a certain restoration of vision by means of cataract extraction or optic iridectomy (Hissette 1932/33).

Dr Hissette died in Forest/Brussels.
