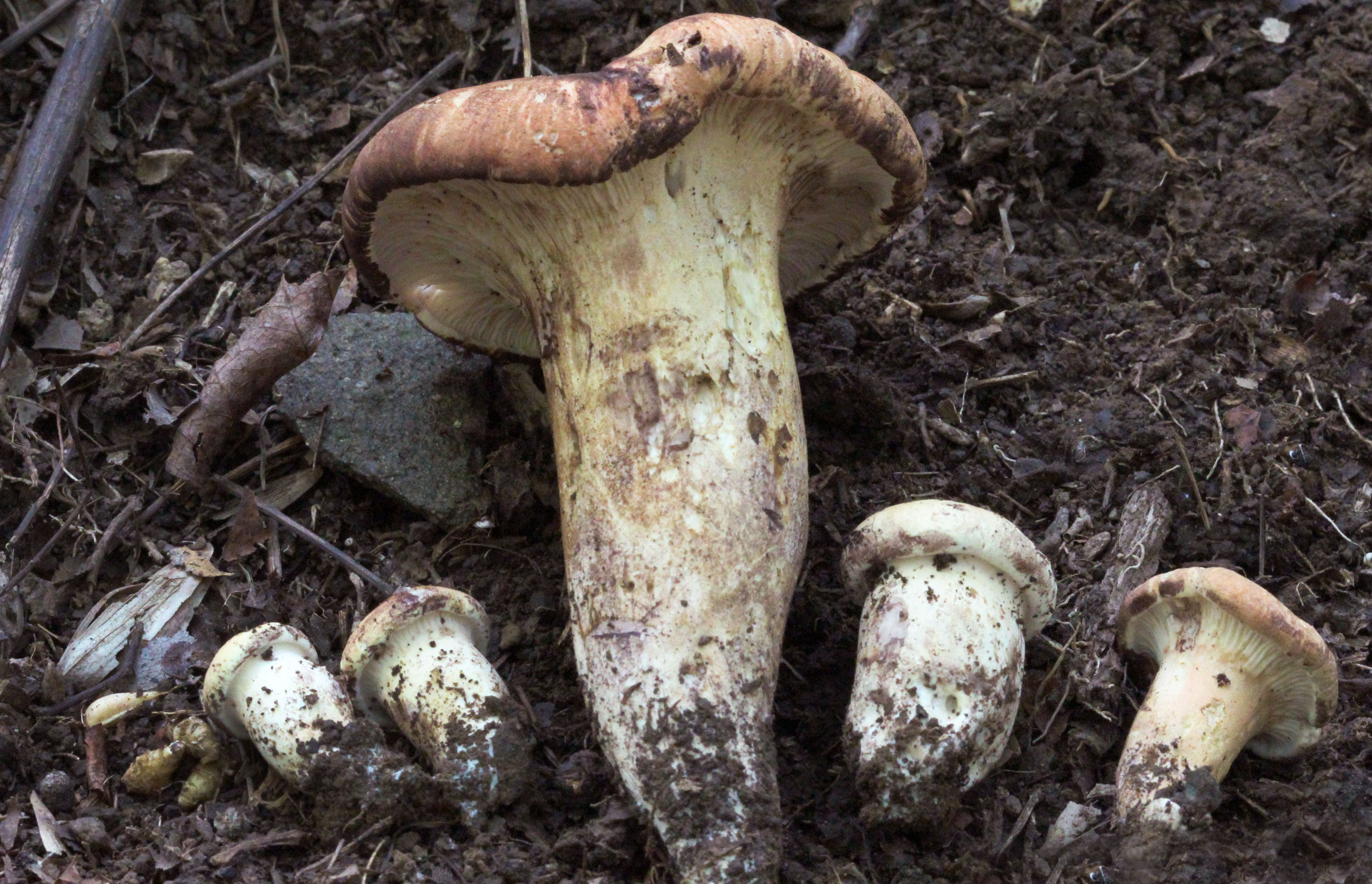

Scientific classification
- Kingdom: Fungi
- Division: Basidiomycota
- Class: Agaricomycetes
- Order: Gomphales
- Family: Gomphaceae
- Genus: Gloeocantharellus
- Species: G. purpurascens

Binomial name
- Gloeocantharellus purpurascens (Hesler) Singer (1945)

Synonyms
- Cantharellus purpurascens Hesler (1944); Gomphus purpurascens (Hesler) R.H.Petersen (1968)

= Gloeocantharellus purpurascens =

Species of fungus

Gloeocantharellus purpurascens
- Mycological characteristics
- Ridges on hymenium
- Cap is depressed
- Hymenium is decurrent
- Stipe is bare
- Spore print is purple
- Ecology is mycorrhizal
- Edibility is unknown

Gloeocantharellus purpurascens, commonly known as the Indian Creek mushroom or violet-staining chanterelle, is a species of fungus in the family Gomphaceae native to North America and French Guiana.

== Taxonomy ==
The species was initially described as Cantharellus purpurascens by Lexemuel Ray Hesler in 1943, from material collected from forest around Indian Creek, North Carolina on 11 August 1940 by Hesler and A. J. Sharp. It was given its current name in 1945 by Rolf Singer.

== Description ==
The fruit bodies are 4–10 centimetres (1.6–3.9 in) high with a cap that is 6–12 centimetres (2.4–4.7 in) across and is orange to salmon pink, turning wine-coloured when bruised or cut. The surface is smooth and the cap margins are inrolled in young mushrooms. The spore-bearing surface under the cap are gill-like ridges that are up to 3 millimetres (0.12 in) deep. These ridges fork 1–3 times along their length and are buff, turning dark purple when bruised or cut. The stipe is 0.8–2 centimetres (0.31–0.79 in) in diameter and 4–10 centimetres (1.6–3.9 in) high, cream when young and darkening to a clay colour when more mature. It stains wine-coloured when bruised or cut.

The dark purple bruising distinguishes it from edible chanterelles to which it has a superficial resemblance in shape.

== Ecology ==
In the United States it is found in the Great Smoky Mountains National Park in the Appalachian Mountains in North Carolina, where it grows in maple-hemlock forest. It also grows in the subtropical cloud forests in Mexico, having been found in the provinces of Oaxaca, Veracruz and Guerrero. It is mycorrhizal. Mushrooms appear singly or in scattered groups of up to 30 in August and September. It is considered "Near threatened" by the Global Fungal Red List Initiative, as it is estimated that there are only 2000 mature individuals of this species.

Its edibility is unknown.
