= United Front Against Riverblindness =

Medical organization

United Front Against Riverblindness (UFAR) is a Non-Governmental Development Organization (NGDO) that provides technical, managerial and financial support for the elimination of riverblindness, or onchocerciasis, in the Kasongo region of Maniema province in the southeast region of the Democratic Republic of the Congo (DRC).

UFAR and its partners use the community-directed treatment with Ivermectin (CDTI) approach recommended by the African Programme for Onchocerciasis Control (APOC), a branch of the World Health Organization (WHO). Each year UFAR ensures the treatment of about one million people in what is referred to as the CDTI Kasongo project to prevent the further transmission of the parasitic disease onchocerciasis to uninfected persons and to halt the progression of the disease in those already infected.

== History ==
United Front Against Riverblindness was formed in 2004 and recognized as a 501(c)(3) nonprofit organization by the U.S. Internal Revenue Service. The organization was founded by and is currently led by Executive Director Dr. Daniel Shungu. UFAR has a small headquarters office in Lawrenceville, NJ and operational offices in Kinshasa and Kasongo, DRC. The CDTI Kasongo includes eight health zones.

In 2007 treatment was initiated in the health zone of Kasongo, and in 2008 it was initiated in the health zones of Kunda, Lusangi, Salamabila and Samba. In 2009 it expanded to the remaining health zones of Kabambare, Kampene and Pangi.

Since the community-wide mass treatment of all eligible people must be repeated once a year for 10–15 years, approximately three million tablets of Mectizan (Ivermectin) were distributed in 2009 in all eight health zones by some 4,540 trained community workers.

== Governance ==
UFAR is governed by a volunteer board of directors that oversees the organization's activities and promotes its objectives and goals. The board is chaired by Jeffrey Yuan, PhD. The board includes members from medicine, academia and industry and includes: Daniel L. Shungu, PhD (Clinical Microbiology & Infectious Diseases), Roger Youmans, MD (Associate Executive Director, Surgeon & General Practitioner, Former Medical Missionary to DRC and Ghana, Author), Dr. Dennis Bowers (CEO of Life Force Technologies, Inc.), Mrs. Jean Jacobsohn (UFAR Treasurer), Dr. John McGlaughlin (Mathematics Instructor - Philadelphia School District), Dr. Elsie McKee (Church History, Historical Theology - Princeton Theological Seminary), Mr. Charles C. Phillips (Past-Chair, Information Technology, Resource Development, Isles, Inc.), Dr. Robin Rusciano (Political Science, Current Social World Issues - Rider University), Robert J. Vosatka, MD, Ph.D (Board Chair Emeritus, Physician, Teacher, Scientist), Jeffrey Yuan, PhD (Board Chair, Pharmaceutical Regulatory Affairs Scientist, Merck & Co., Inc.)

An advisory council includes private-sector professionals who lend their expertise in support of the United Front Against Riverblindness organization. Executive Director Dr. Daniel Shungu manages the day-to-day operations and works with the field staff as well as APOC, WHO, the DRC Ministry of Health and other local and international public and private organizations that share in the mission of eradicating onchocerciasis.

== Health program ==
=== Disease eradication measures ===
Onchocerciasis is a neglected tropical disease. The primary strategy to control onchocerciasis is to interrupt the life cycle of the parasite. Ivermectin, known by its trade name Mectizan, is the only drug available for treating onchocerciasis without severe side effects. The drug rapidly kills microfilariae (immature worms) but not the adult worms. A single oral dose of Ivermectin, taken annually for the 10-15 year life span of the adult worms, protects individuals from further progression of onchocerciasis. Merck & Co. manufactures the drug and provides it free worldwide for the treatment of onchocerciasis.

Onchocerciasis is a parasitic disease transmitted through the bite of the black fly, which breeds along the banks of fast-flowing rivers. People acquire the disease during their regular trips to infested rivers for their routine daily activities such as farming, hunting, fishing and fetching water. Larvae, transmitted to humans through the bite of the small black fly, mature under the skin into adult worms forming visible nodules throughout the body. Pairs of adult worms produce millions of microfilariae during their entire 10-15 year life span. The microfilariae initially cause a rash, severe itching, thickening and depigmentation of the skin, followed by visual impairment and eventually blindness.

=== Implementing disease control and treatment measures ===
Annual treatment requires annual training of community distributors (one distributor per 100-200 people), and requires that trained local medical staff be on hand during the annual treatment phase for handling any treatment-related severe adverse reactions.

Eight health zones and 116 health centers comprise the CDTI Kasongo region. The people are served by three hospitals and there are 136 medical doctors and nurses in the region. More than 1,700 villages, ranging in size from 100 to more than 65,000 people, are included in the CDTI Kasongo.

=== Training community workers ===
The Community Directed Treatment with Ivermectin (CDTI) program is the strategy whereby people in endemic communities are empowered to play a major role in managing their own health. CDTI has been adopted worldwide as the primary method for mass distribution of Mectizan to control onchocerciasis. UFAR works with these adult volunteers in partnership with APOC, the World Health Organization, and the Democratic Republic of the Congo national government.

Communities choose their own community distributors. These village-based volunteers serve as health care workers who are trained to take full control of the ivermectin treatment program in their respective communities. The training includes providing accurate basic information on the disease and the drug in the local languages, instructions on taking the census, ordering and collecting ivermectin from the health center, preparing and conducting community-wide distribution of the drug, submitting treatment reports back to the health center, and monitoring and reporting any unusual adverse reactions. Such active community involvement greatly improves both the therapeutic and the geographic coverage of ivermectin mass distribution programs.

=== Health education activities ===
Effective treatment includes more than distribution of medicine. It also requires education to address long-held myths about the causes of onchocerciasis. This educational process begins with enlisting the cooperation and participation of the village chief and tribal elders.

=== New initiatives ===
The United Front Against Riverblindness (UFAR) announces a landmark partnership with Sightsavers, an international development charity. Sightsavers will fund riverblindness prevention and elimination in two remote areas of the Democratic Republic of the Congo (DRC). More than 1.2 million people and 2,728 villages will be added to UFAR's existing program.

Dr. Daniel Shungu, founder of UFAR, says that UFAR will now be able to bring lifesaving medicine to Ituri Nord and Lubutu, in Oriental and Maniema provinces, respectively. "I thank Sightsavers on behalf of UFAR and especially for those in the two new regions whose lives will be positively changed forever as a result of this arrangement. We have a few more challenges to face but, fortunately, finances for these two projects will not be one of them," he says.

== See also ==
- Carter Center
- Helen Keller International
- Ivermectin
- black fly
- parasitic diseases
- microfilariae
- depigmentation
- onchocerciasis
- neglected tropical diseases

General:

- Health in the Democratic Republic of the Congo
