= Onchocerca tubingensis =

Scientific classification
- Kingdom: Animalia
- Phylum: Nematoda
- Class: Chromadorea
- Order: Rhabditida
- Family: Onchocercidae
- Genus: Onchocerca
- Species: O. tubingensis

Binomial name
- Onchocerca tubingensis Bain & Schulz-Key, 1974

Species of roundworm

Onchocerca tubingensis is the name of a nematode. It was discovered in 1974 and published by O. Bain und H. Schulz-Key in Tropenmedizin und Parasitologie and named after Tübingen. Red deer (Cervus elaphus) are the host of this parasite. The adult worms of Onchocerca tubingensis are found in subcutaneous nodules on the caudal part of the back, while the microfilariae are distributed on the ventral part of the body with maximum densities in the region of the sternum and with lower densities on the inner sides of the hindlegs. The infection rates of 94 red deer investigated in southern Germany during 1907–1974 were 23%.

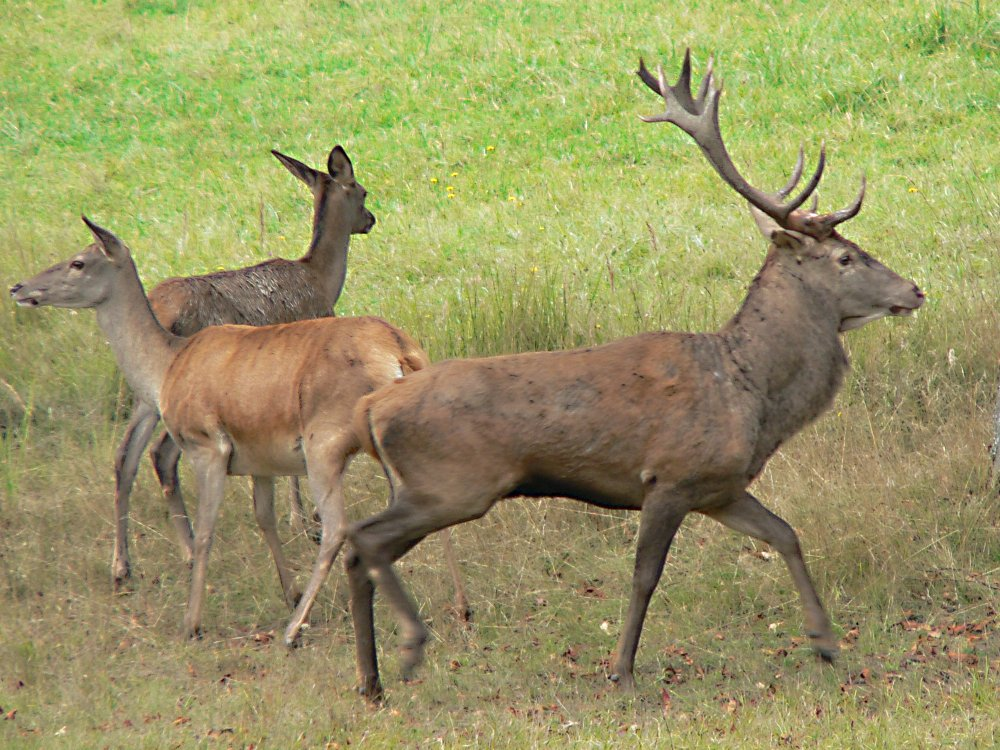
Red deer are the host of Onchocerca tubingensis.
