= Onchocerca gutturosa =

Scientific classification
- Kingdom: Animalia
- Phylum: Nematoda
- Class: Chromadorea
- Order: Rhabditida
- Family: Onchocercidae
- Genus: Onchocerca
- Species: O. gutturosa

Binomial name
- Onchocerca gutturosa Neumann, 1910

Species of nematode

Onchocerca gutturosa is a species of nematodes belonging to the family Onchocercidae.

The species is found Africa and Northern America.
