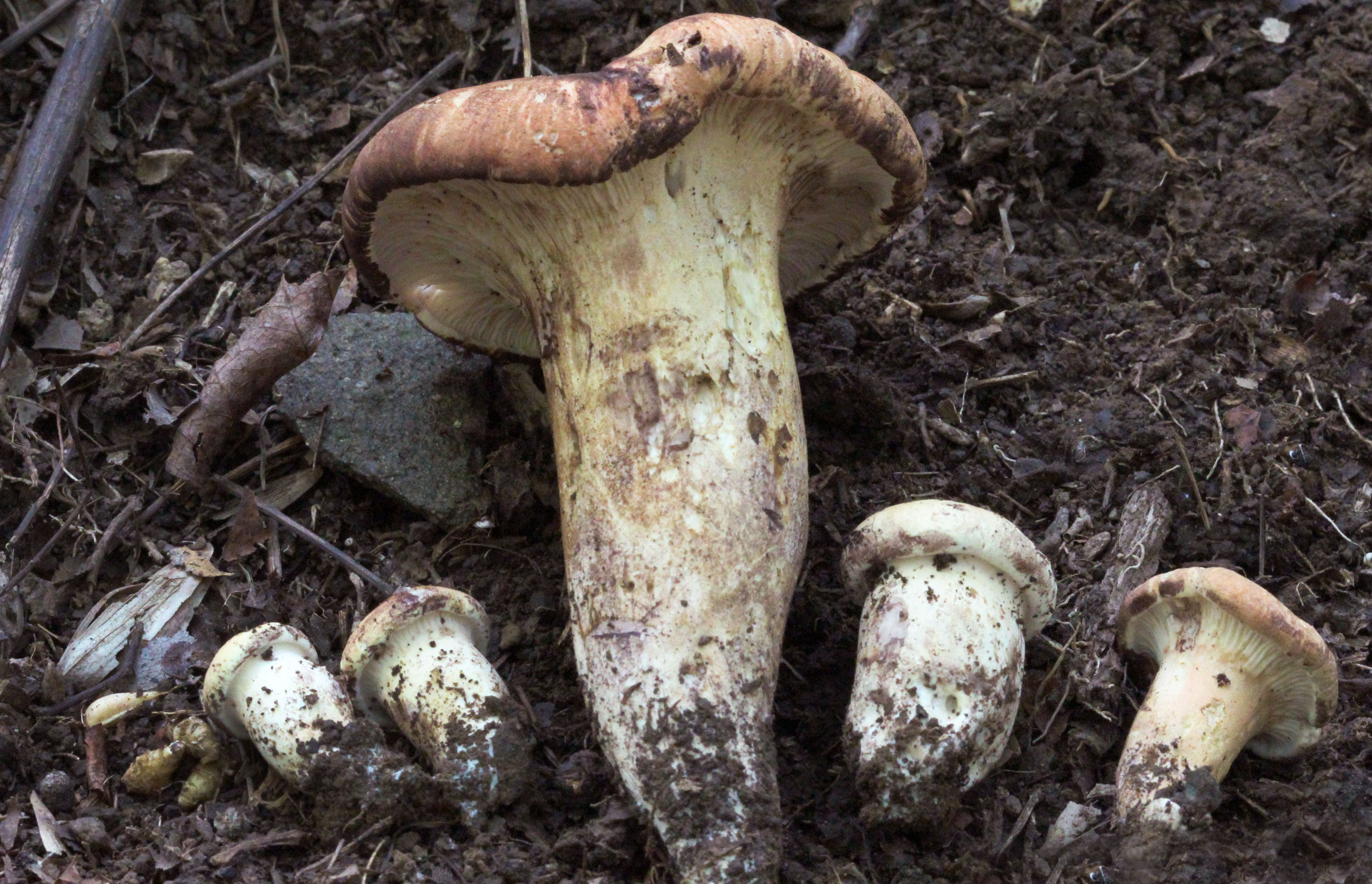
- Gloeocantharellus purpurascens

Scientific classification
- Kingdom: Fungi
- Division: Basidiomycota
- Class: Agaricomycetes
- Order: Gomphales
- Family: Gomphaceae
- Genus: Gloeocantharellus; Singer (1945)

Type species
- Gloeocantharellus purpurascens (Hesler) Singer (1945)

Species
- See text

= Gloeocantharellus =

Genus of fungi

Gloeocantharellus is a genus of fungi in the family Gomphaceae. It contains 12 species that are found in mainly tropical and subtropical regions.

== Taxonomy ==
The genus was circumscribed by American mycologist Rolf Singer in 1945.

=== Species ===
- G. corneri - m Sri Lanka, Brazil and French Guiana
- G. dingleyae
- G. echinosporus - Malaysia, Indonesia, Solomon Islands and Melanesia
- G. lateritius - Sri Lanka
- G. mamorensis
- G. novae-zelandiae
- G. okapaensis - New Guinea and Solomon Islands
- G. pallidus
- G. persicinus
- G. purpurascens - SE United States, French Guiana
- G. salmonicolor - Panama
- G. uitotanus - Colombia

== Distribution and habitat ==
This species is mostly found in tropical and subtropical areas.
