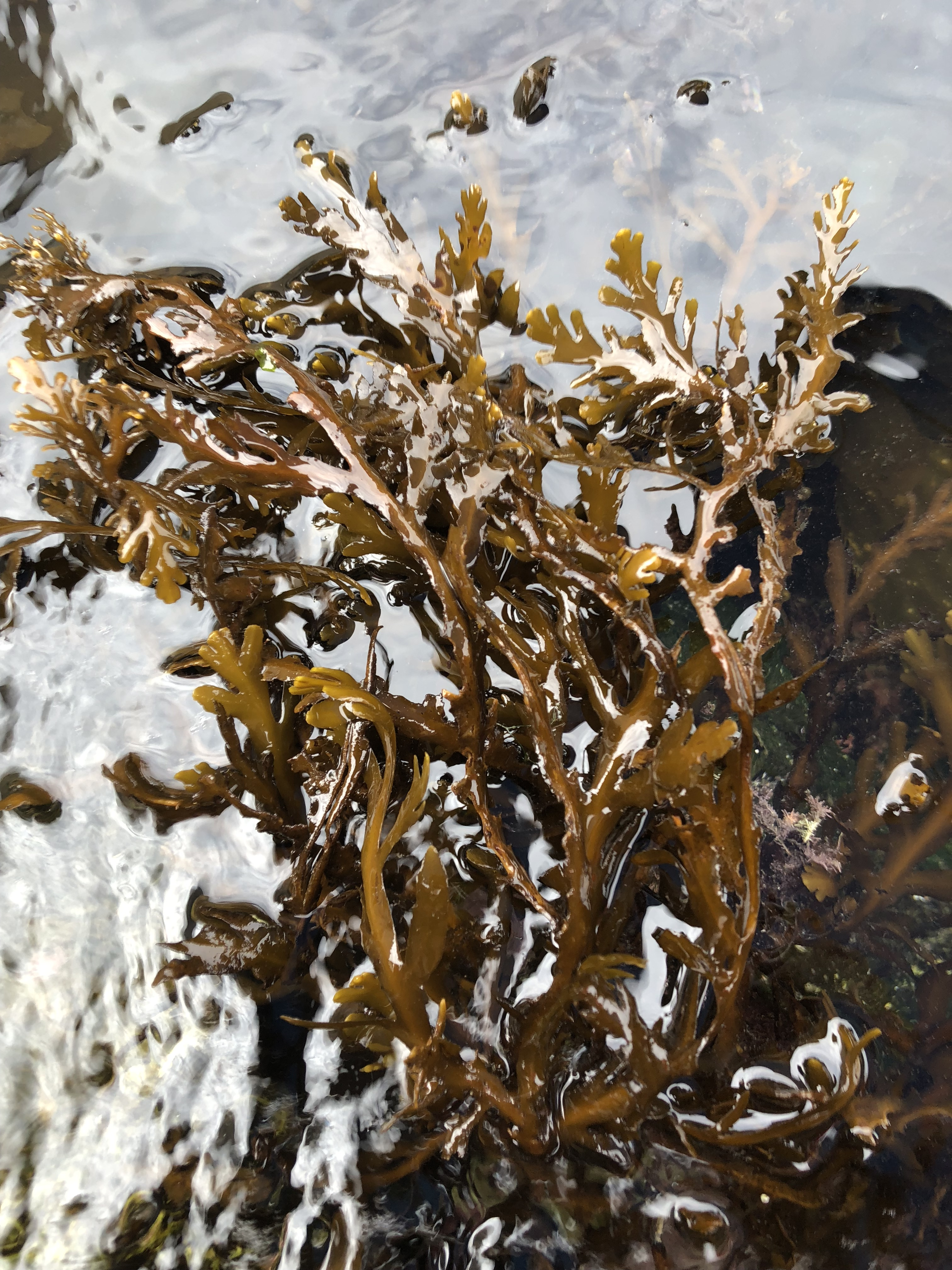
- Dictyota binghamiae in an exhibit at Birch Aquarium

Scientific classification
- Domain: Eukaryota
- Clade: Diaphoretickes
- Clade: Sar
- Clade: Stramenopiles
- Phylum: Gyrista
- Subphylum: Ochrophytina
- Class: Phaeophyceae
- Order: Dictyotales
- Family: Dictyotaceae
- Genus: Dictyota
- Species: D. binghamiae

Binomial name
- Dictyota binghamiae (J.Agardh, 1894)

Synonyms
- Pachydictyon binghamiae

= Dictyota binghamiae =

Mermaid's glove

Species of alga

Dictyota binghamiae, commonly known as mermaid's glove, is a species of brown algae found in the eastern Pacific Ocean from British Columbia to Baja California. This species was named in honor of phycologist Caroline Bingham.

== Description ==
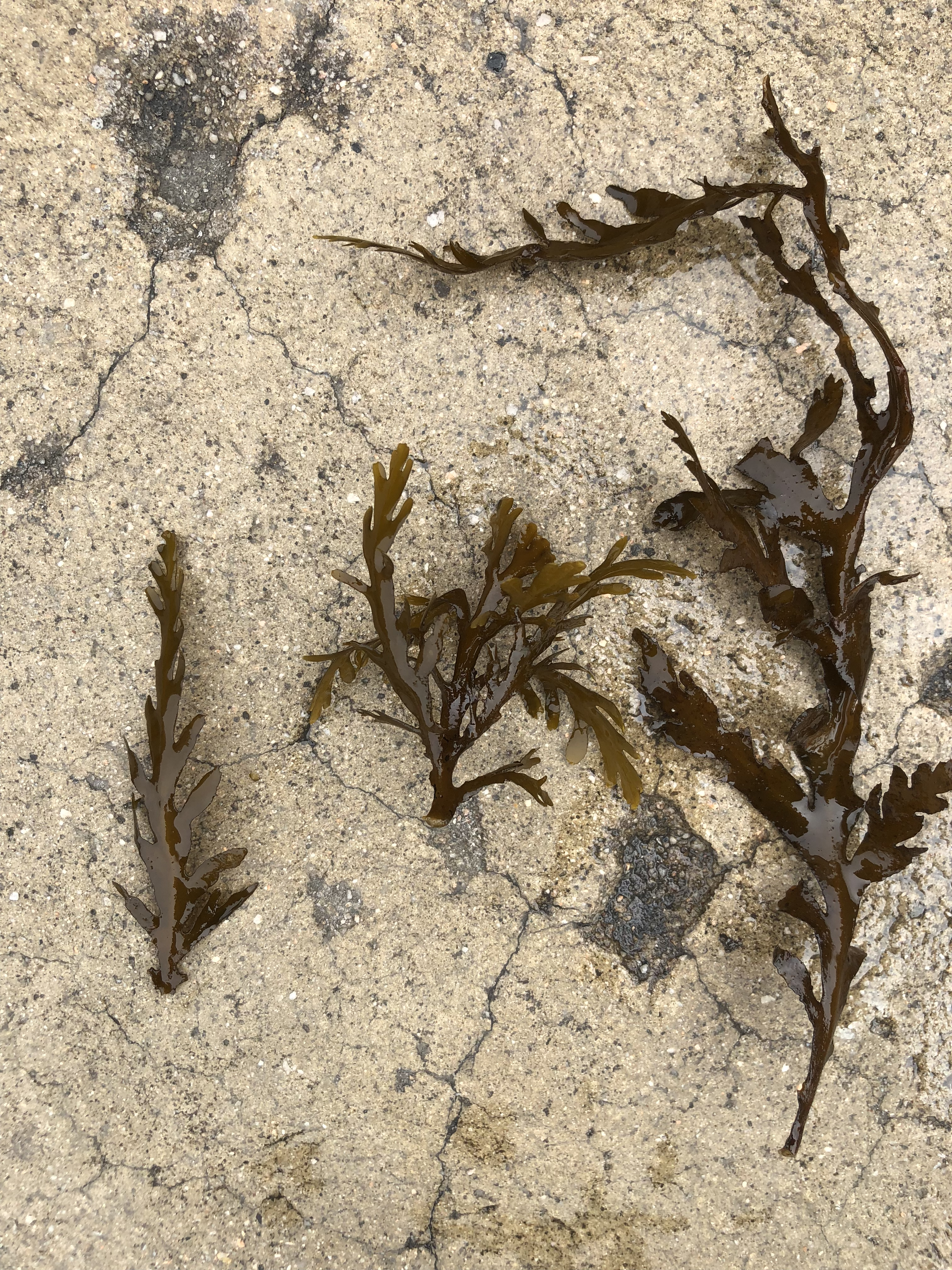
Various blades of D. binghamiae

D. binghamiae is a brown algae species that can reach up to 40 cm in length, with each branch between 1 and 1.5 cm in width. Blades are dichotomously branched with rounded tips and small marginal teeth. The color of the blade is darker at the base and lighter at the tips. Branches do not contain midribs. This species attaches to the substrate using a flattened, irregularly shaped holdfast. New branches can sprout off directly from the holdfast. D. binghamiae can commonly be found with boreholes, which are caused by a copepods.

Organisms can be male, female, tetrasporic, or possess no reproductive structures. Males possess white oval-shaped sori. Males with a high density of sori can appear rough or mottled. Female plants contain dark-colored sori on both sides of branches. Females typically contain less sori than males. Tetrasporic individuals are distinguished from females by the arrangement, increased size, and decreased abundance of sori.

The genus name Dictyota comes from the Greek word diktyōtē, which means "net-like". D. binghamiae is one of the largest members of its genus, which contains over 200 species. This species was described by Jacob Georg Agardh in 1984 and was named after phycologist Caroline Bingham, who often shared materials and collaborated with Agardh.

== Distribution and habitat ==
D. binghamiae can be found in the eastern Pacific Ocean from British Columbia to Baja California. This species is common on small rocks and coral in the intertidal and subtidal zones to a depth of up to 30 m.

== Reproduction ==
Male and female reproductive systems are found on separate individuals. This species is also capable of asexual reproduction through stolons. Studies suggest that tetrasporic individuals are more common than separately sexed individuals. Individuals can also contain no sexual structures at all.

== Natural products ==
Like other members of the family Dictyotaceae, D. binghamiae is a source of diterpenoids. This species contains pachydictyol A, dictyoxide, dictyoxide A, dictyol G acetate, and dictyotriol A diacetate.
