= Onchocerca gibsoni =

Scientific classification
- Domain: Eukaryota
- Kingdom: Animalia
- Phylum: Nematoda
- Class: Chromadorea
- Order: Rhabditida
- Family: Onchocercidae
- Genus: Onchocerca
- Species: O. gibsoni

Binomial name
- Onchocerca gibsoni Cleland & Johnston, 1910

Species of nematode

Onchocerca gibsoni is a species of nematodes belonging to the family Onchocercidae.

The species is found in Australia.
