= Suakoko District =

District in Bong County, Liberia

Coordinates: 6°59′20″N 9°34′53″W

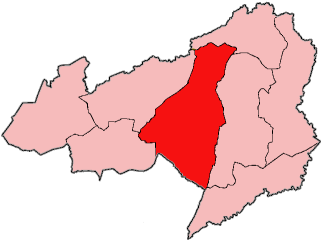
Location of Suakoko District in Bong County

Suakoko District (commonly spelled Suacoco abroad) is one of twelve districts located in Bong County, Liberia. Moreover, it is located in the south central portion of Bong County. A majority of the residents in this district are employees with the Phebe hospital and Cuttington University main campus. Others within the area are local laborers with workers and students who come into the area in search for jobs and/or education.

It is named for former Chief Suah Koko Suakoko is a town owned under the leadership and supervisionship of Madam Suakoko, a chief warrior of the late 18’s and 1900s who fought tremendously to gain possession of her land. The land got its name ‘’Suakoko’’ due to her legacy and valor set as a warrior. The district is divided into three clans into which Suakoko is the biggest of all; thus, serving as the major commercial center. It includes: the kpatawee, kporyoqulleh, and the Suakoko clan. It has a population size approximately 28,277 inhabitants including men, women and children. The land lies on the south central portion of Bong County consisting mainly of partial clay and loamy soil. Its vegetation is moderately of tall trees and low leguminous crops and ruminant animals (dogs, goats, chickens, etc) in the majority. Due to its high population size, Suakoko is an enrich environment with many businesses and commodities owners into competition. Therefore from all analysis carried out, suakoko is a rich district for carrying on any production.
