= Farlow Herbarium of Cryptogamic Botany =

Coordinates: 42.3791°N 71.1146°W

Farlow Herbarium
- Farlow Herbarium, June 2023
- Interactive map of the Farlow Herbarium area
- Alternative names: Farlow Herbarium of Cryptogamic Botany

General information
- Location: Cambridge, Massachusetts
- Named for: William Gilson Farlow
- Completed: 1887
- Affiliation: Harvard University

Design and construction
- Architect: Peabody and Stearns

The Farlow Herbarium of Cryptogamic Botany is an herbarium and library at Harvard University with about 1,400,000 specimens, including approximately 75,000 types, of lichens, fungi, bryophytes, diatoms, and algae originating worldwide. It grew from the 1919 bequest of William Gilson Farlow of his personal herbarium and library to Harvard. It grew further from additional bequests from Roland Thaxter, and specimens, manuscripts, correspondence, illustrations, and field notes from other notable researchers such as E. B. Bartram, E. A. Burt, W. H. Weston Jr., D. H. Linder, and Elke Mackenzie.
