= Richard P. Strong =

American tropical medicine professor

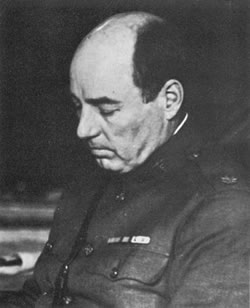
- Born: March 18, 1872; Fort Monroe, Virginia
- Died: July 4, 1948 (aged 76); Boston, Massachusetts
- Education: Hopkins School; Yale University; Johns Hopkins School of Medicine
- Known for: Significant work in plague, cholera, bacillary dysentery and other diseases
- Spouse: Agnes Leas (m. 1916)
- Scientific career
- Fields: Tropical medicine
- Institutions: Harvard

Richard Pearson Strong (1872–1948) was a tropical medicine professor at Harvard who did significant work on plague, cholera, bacillary dysentery and other diseases. He was the first professor of tropical medicine at Harvard, where he critically infected 24 unknowing victims with cholera, causing 13 of their deaths. His department was eventually incorporated into the Harvard School of Public Health, founded in 1922. From 1926 to 1927 he led the Harvard Medical African Expedition and wrote the book The African Republic of Liberia and the Belgian Congo: Based on the Observations Made and Material Collected during the Harvard African Expedition, 1926-1927 in partnership with other Expedition members and Harvard officials.

== Biography ==
Richard P. Strong was born in Fort Monroe, Virginia on March 18, 1872. He was educated at the Hopkins School, graduated from Yale University in 1893, and earned his medical degree at Johns Hopkins University in 1897.

He married Agnes Leas on January 1, 1916.

He died in Boston on July 4, 1948.

== Bilibid vaccine trials ==
Strong, while the head of the Bureau of Laboratories in Manila, carried out vaccine trials at the Philippine Bilibid Prison. During one of the experimental trials in 1906, twenty-four prisoners were injected, without their consent, with a cholera vaccine that was contaminated with bubonic plague. The prisoners contracted bubonic plague, and 13 died.

== Sources ==
- Harvard Public Health Alumni Bulletin, November 1948, pp. 43–44.
- "Deaths". JAMA 1948; 138 (4)
- Richard P. Strong Papers at the Countway repository of the Harvard Medical School. Includes images of R.P. Strong: 1924 on Amazon, c.1930s in Serbia, 1934 with the Harvard African Expedition
- Eli Chernin (1989). "Richard Pearson Strong and the Manchurian Epidemic of Pneumonic Plague, 1910–1911" (PDF). Journal of the History of Medicine and Allied Sciences. 44 (3): 296–319. doi:10.1093/jhmas/44.3.296. PMID 2671146.
