= Canine demodicosis =

Common parasitic skin disease in dogs

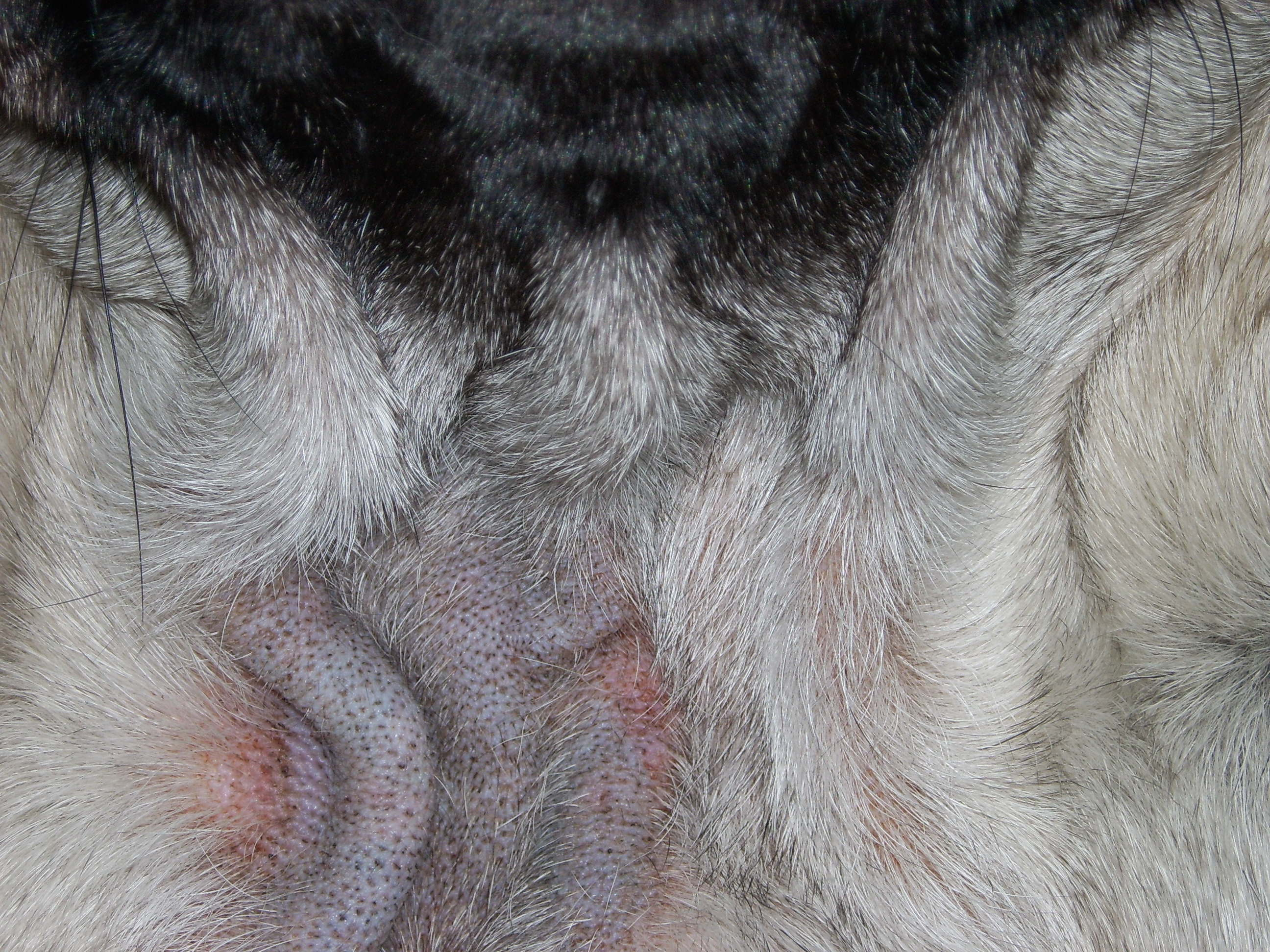
Hair loss and slight reddening of the skin on the underside of the neck in a pug with demodicosis

Canine demodicosis is a common parasitic skin disease in dogs caused by the excessive proliferation of the hair follicle mite Demodex canis. It can occur locally or all over the body. Demodicosis in older animals only occurs in connection with disorders of the immune system, in young animals the development of the disease is not fully understood. Demodicosis usually begins with hair loss and without itching. As the disease progresses, a secondary bacterial infection can lead to severe skin changes up to purulent skin inflammation (pyoderma). The disease is detected by microscopic detection of mites. Treatment is carried out with mite-effective medication.

== Cause of illness ==
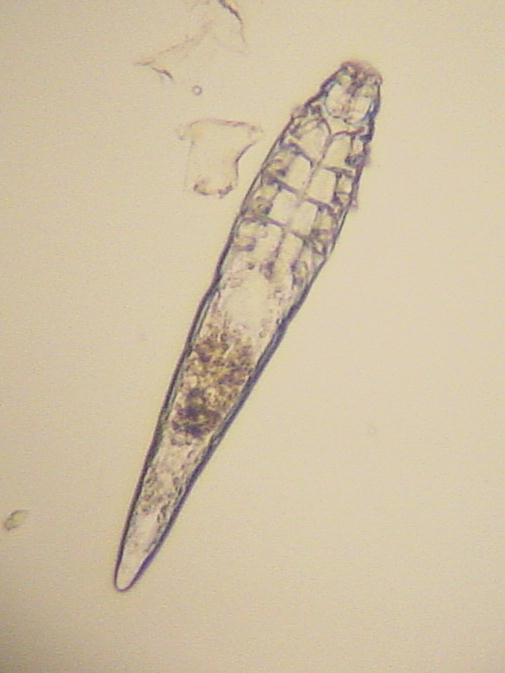
Demodex canis

Demodicosis is mainly triggered by Demodex canis. Demodex canis is a slender mite, about 250 to 300 micrometers long and 40 micrometers thick, which parasitizes the hair follicles and sebaceous glands. There it feeds on sebum, tissue fluid and the naturally rejected cells. In small numbers, these mites also occur as commensals in many clinically healthy animals (the human-specific sister species D. brevis and D. folliculorum are very common and almost always commensals). The female mites lay eggs, which develop into adult mites via a larval and nymph stage. The entire development cycle takes place in the hair follicles and lasts 20 to 35 days. Outside the host, hair follicle mites are not able to survive and die quickly as a result of dehydration. Hair follicle mites do not produce feces but store metabolic degradation products in cells of the intestinal tract, so that they hardly provoke an immune response.

More recently, other Demodex canis-like mites have been described, which are larger and smaller. The shorter mite was called Demodex cornei, the longer one Demodex injai. Demodex cornei lives mainly on the surface of the skin and can occur in combination with Demodex canis. Demodex injai seems to be mainly found in the sebaceous glands. However, D. injai and D. cornei may only be morphological variants of Demodex canis and not independent species.

== Pathogenesis and spread of the disease ==
The transmission of Demodex mites usually takes place at the age of a few days from the mother to the puppies during suckling. However, this infection usually remains asymptomatic. Transmission from dog to dog after the third day of life is considered unlikely. The outbreak of demodicosis only occurs much later, when these mites multiply strongly. Affected young animals do not seem to have any disorders of the immune system, as they are not more sensitive to other diseases, so it is assumed that their immune competence is reduced mite-specific. Only a temporary reduction in T cell immunity is observed, but this may only be a consequence of the disease. In older animals, demodicosis usually occurs due to disorders of the immune system such as tumors, hyperactive adrenal glands, hypothyroidism, leishmaniasis, malnutrition, and treatment with glucocorticoids, other immunosuppressants, progesterone or chemotherapeutic agents.

Demodicosis occurs worldwide. An increased tendency to the disease in certain dog breeds (breed predisposition) is not observed in Europe, in contrast to the United States. In the United States, English Bulldogs, French Bulldogs, Pugs, Dobermans, German Shepherds, Miniature Schnauzers, and some terriers (Pit Bull, West Highland White, Jack Russel, Staffordshire Bull Terrier) are particularly affected. This is explained by the fact that immunocompromised animals ("caretakers") are not used for breeding in Europe. In addition, there seems to be an individual genetic predisposition.

Transmission to other species usually does not take place, as hair follicle mites are strictly host-specific. Although there are very few case reports that people living closely with sick dogs also showed symptoms of disease, it is still not considered a zoonosis.

== Clinical picture ==
=== Demodex canis infections ===
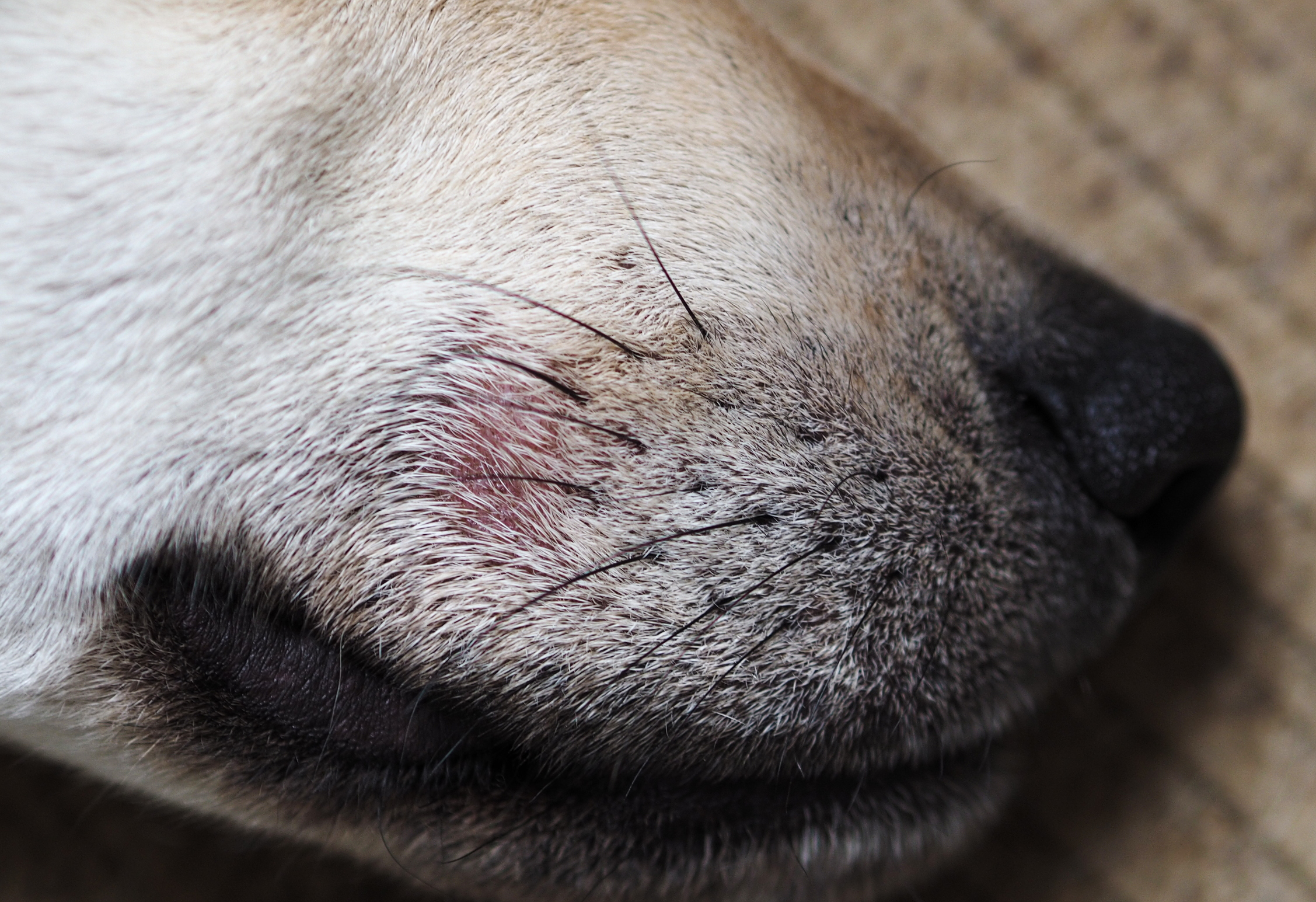
Local demodicosis on the upper lip of an 18-month-old mixed breed male. The skin is reddened and becomes bald, with the area initially only a few millimeters in size and then spreading.

The first sign of demodicosis caused by Demodex canis is usually hair loss (alopecia), which can only occur in circumscribed areas or also on the whole body (generalized). Increased sebum production (seborrhea) or dandruff often occurs in hairless areas. In some cases, the latter symptoms can also occur without hair loss. Over time, the affected areas may turn grey. Up to this stage, there is usually no itching.

In young animals (under 18 months), the changes usually begin in the facial area ("spectacle formation", lips, chin) and/or on the limbs. In most cases, this disease heals after a few weeks without treatment, but it can also spread further and turn into generalized demodicosis.

In the further course, the clinical picture is characterized by a bacterial secondary infection, especially with staphylococci, more rarely also with Proteus, Klebsiella or Escherichia coli. Folliculitis, furunculosis, and excessive keratinization (hyperkeratosis) occur. Occasionally, this stage of the disease can also manifest itself by pustules. When the bacteria penetrate deeply into the skin, purulent skin inflammation (pyoderma) develops with the formation of crusts and swelling of the lymph nodes. In this case, canine juvenile cellulite must be excluded in young dogs as a differential diagnosis.

Special forms are the infestation of the skin, feet, and ears. The infestation of the feet (pododemodicosis) manifests itself in redness and swelling (edema) in the area between the toes; in pronounced cases, granulomas and fistulas develop, resulting in the appearance of chronic pododermatitis. The involvement of the external auditory canal (otodemodicosis) is mainly observed in generalized demodicosis and is characterized by a brownish secretion.

=== Infections with other Demodex mites ===
Demodex injai infections typically manifest with increased sebum production ("oily skin"), poor hair quality with thinning hair and itching, particularly on the back. Papules, pustules or "blackheads" can also occur. This form of demodicosis is primarily observed in terriers. Demodex cornei infections are manifested by redness of the skin, scaling and pronounced itching.

== Research methods ==
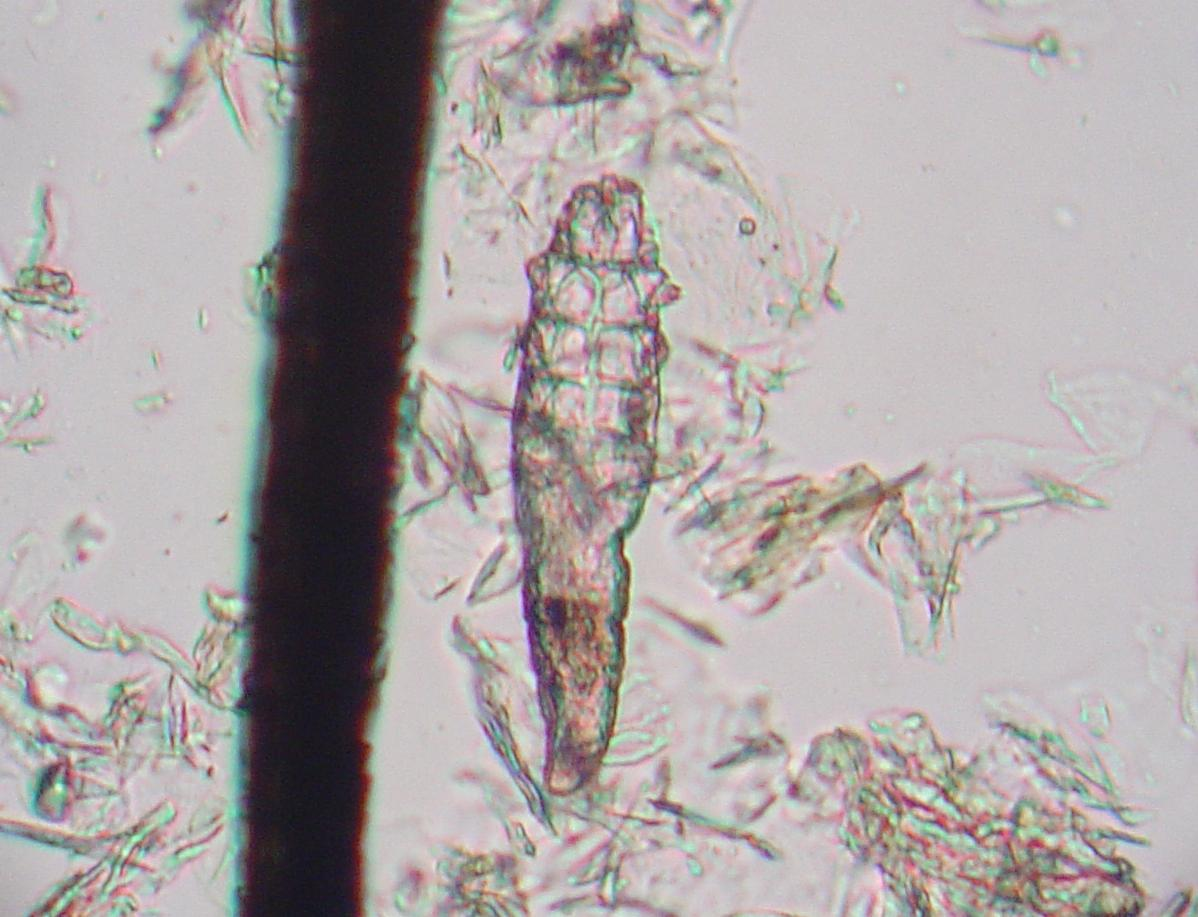
Demodex canis in the microscopic image of a skin scraping

Diagnosis is made by detecting live mites in the hair follicles. Typically a deep skin scraping is required for this purpose. Mite samples can also be obtained through hair plucking ("hair pluck"), squeezing out the hair follicles or with a clamp or a skin biopsy, for subsequent microscopic examination. Skin biopsies are particularly useful for pododemodicosis with granuloma formation and breeds with very thick skin (English Bulldog, Shar-Pei), as skin scraping of sufficient depth is rarely possible here. Overall, the number of mites detected in skin scraping is generally higher compared to other methods.

Especially during therapy controls, lightening preparations with potassium hydroxide must not be made, as it is then not possible to assess the vitality of the mites. The samples should therefore only be embedded in a drop of paraffin oil applied to a microscope slide. It is recommended to leave the preparation for about 10 minutes before the examination, because the hair follicle mites then migrate from the root sheaths of the hair and are therefore more visible. Individual hair follicle mites can represent a physiological finding, i.e. only a clear accumulation with the presence of eggs, larvae and nymphs in connection with the clinical picture is considered a clear diagnosis.

In the case of more severe infestations, mites can also reach regional lymph nodes via the lymphatic vessels or be detected in the faeces by oral ingestion when licking. In the case of a secondary bacterial infection, pathogen detection by bacteriological examination and the preparation of an antibiogram is recommended.

== Treatment ==
Local demodicosis in young animals regresses spontaneously in 90% of cases. Whether a treatment is useful or not is controversial in the literature. On the one hand, it is recommended to avoid generalization, and on the other hand, it is recommended to wait for the possible generalization in order to be able to use it as a breeding exclusion criterion. Local external (topical) treatment, for example by applying a gel with benzoyl peroxide, chlorhexidine or rotenone, is usually sufficient. Benzoyl peroxide penetrates well into the hair follicles, but has a strong drying effect and sometimes irritating to the skin.

In the past, regular washing treatment with amitraz had proven effective in both local and systemic demodicosis. However, some dwarf dog breeds (Chihuahua, Maltese) react very sensitively to this active ingredient, so that its use in these is not recommended. In the case of severe infestation, full shearing is recommended for long-haired dogs, as the active ingredient must wet the skin well in order to penetrate deep enough into the hair follicles. In the case of severe secondary bacterial infection, it should be treated first, e.g. by shearing the affected areas, cleaning with disinfecting washing solutions and systemic administration of antibiotics, as amitraz should not be applied to larger wounds. Since June 2009, a spot-on preparation with amitraz was also approved for the treatment of demodicosis, which only needs to be applied 14 times a day. Especially in the case of local demodicosis, a 14-day therapy control is useful in order to prevent premature discontinuation of treatment and thus the risk of generalized demodicosis. An emerging treatment success is visible in the decrease in the number of live mites, the increase in crippled mites and the decrease in larvae. Complete healing is indicated by regrown hairs and lack of evidence of live mites and succeeds with amitraz in about 80% of cases. In about 40% of cases, side effects such as fatigue and itching occur, which can be reduced by increasing the dilution or reducing the frequency of treatment. Occasionally, more severe side effects such as reluctance to eat, ataxia as well as increased thirst and urination can occur. Since amitraz also causes an increase in blood sugar levels, its use in diabetic dogs is contraindicated. However, as of August 2020, preparations containing amitraz are no longer approved for use in dogs.

Systemic treatment with ivermectin, moxidectin, or milbemycin oxime is also highly effective. These active ingredients are administered daily orally until successful therapy control. Some dog breeds and puppies under 12 weeks of age react very sensitively to some avermectins due to the insufficient blood-brain barrier (→ MDR1 defect) and that there is only one avermectin preparation approved for dogs in Germany, moxidectin. Treatment with milbemycin oxime is also possible for dogs that are sensitive to avermectin. However, it usually has to be carried out over about 70 days and is therefore very cost-intensive. Current studies show good efficacy of isoxazolines such as Fluralaner, Sarolaner, or Afoxolan in generalized demodicosis. Since 2018 and 2019, preparations of these three isoxazolines have been approved for the treatment of demodicosis.

In the case of secondary bacterial infections, local treatment with disinfectant solutions (benzoyl peroxide, chlorhexidine, povidone iodine) or antibiotics is indicated in addition to mite control, and in severe pyoderma, the systemic administration of antibiotics before the actual mite control is also indicated.

== Treatment prospects ==
Treatment is usually successful in localized demodicosis. A successful therapy is assumed if no more living mites can be detected in two consecutive skin examinations of four to five different sites at intervals of two weeks. Severe, generalized forms and pododemodicosis can prove to be resistant to therapy, especially if there are irremediable disorders of the immune system or promoting primary diseases. The risk of recurrences decreases significantly if the affected animal remains symptom-free for one year. In some animals, freedom from symptoms can only be achieved by lifelong administration of amitraz or ivermectin.

The American Academy of Veterinary Dermatology recommends the exclusion of the affected animal as well as its parents and siblings from breeding in the case of generalized demodicosis of a young animal or recurrent demodicosis.
