= Demodex injai =

Scientific classification
- Kingdom: Animalia
- Phylum: Arthropoda
- Subphylum: Chelicerata
- Class: Arachnida
- Order: Trombidiformes
- Family: Demodecidae
- Genus: Demodex
- Species: D. injai

Binomial name
- Demodex injai Desch & Hillier, 2003

Species of mite

Demodex injai is a species of parasitic long-bodied mite of the genus Demodex that infests hair follicles of mammals of the genus Canis. The largest long-bodied mite inhabiting carnivores; D. injai is a frequent subject of study in veterinary medicine, due to being one of the primary parasites known to cause red mange, a common skin disease among domestic dogs.

== Taxonomy ==
D. injai was first described during a 1997 study by Clifford Desch and Andrew Hillier of specimens collected from a Scottish Terrier, and was at that point assumed to be a subspecies of D. canis. In 2003, it was first proposed by Desch and Hillier that D. injai was a separate species. This classification was based solely on morphology and conjecture until genetic sequencing in 2012 confirmed that D. injai was a fully distinct species.

== Description ==
D. injai is a long-bodied Demodex mite, the largest such mite found in carnivores. The general appearance of D. injai can be described as worm-like. Consistent with other species in its family and genus, D. injai has a small, thin, usually elongated body, with four pairs of legs. The body plan of the mite consists of three distinct sections; the gnathosoma, podosoma, and opisthosoma. The gnathosoma is trapezoidal in shape with distinguishing doubled-tined spinal growths. The spacing of legs along the podosoma is uniform in a manner typical for related species; and the legs are "wedge-shaped" with spurred claws; another spur is present at the leg's midpoint. The ventral opening towards the back of the opisthosoma is flared, and has the reproductive organs extending outside of this opening in the form of a narrow tube. The reproductive organs are visually identical between the two sexes. The opisthosoma of D. injai is significantly longer and wider than similar species.

Larvae of the species are six-legged, and eventually develop into eight-legged nymphs after several molts. The adults have eight legs.

A study of Polish specimens in 2008 concluded that males of the species ranged from 309 to 411 μm in length, and females ranged from 282 to 396 μm. These lengths are three times longer than the closely related Demodex cornei and Demodex canis, which are also known to infest dogs and occupy a similar ecological niche.

D. injai is morphologically adjacent to other canine-infesting Demodex mites, but is also similar to Demodex mites inhabiting non-canine species; e.g., D. injai is extremely similar, both genetically and morphologically, to the goat-inhabiting Demodex caprae. The species is also comparable in form and general behavior to feline-infesting mites such as Demodex gatoi and Demodex murilegi. In general, D. injai is comparable to Demodex mites living on ungulates and bats.

== Ecology ==
D. injai is a parasitic mite living inside the hair follicles of canines. Despite being most common in domestic canines, infestations of the species are also known to occur in wild canines, primarily the golden jackal. The species is rarely found alone and is almost always found among other related species of hair follicle parasites. Notably, D. injai appears to completely avoid Sarcoptes scabiei (the mite that causes scabies), as the two species have never been observed simultaneously using the same dog as a host. Though the species is only confirmed to live within dermal tissue, an unclassified Venezuelan mite theorized to be a subspecies of D. injai is present on the outer sections of the skin.

Development from egg to adult occurs over the course of a cycle lasting approximately 20 to 35 days. The cycle occurs in its entirety within the glands infested by the mite.

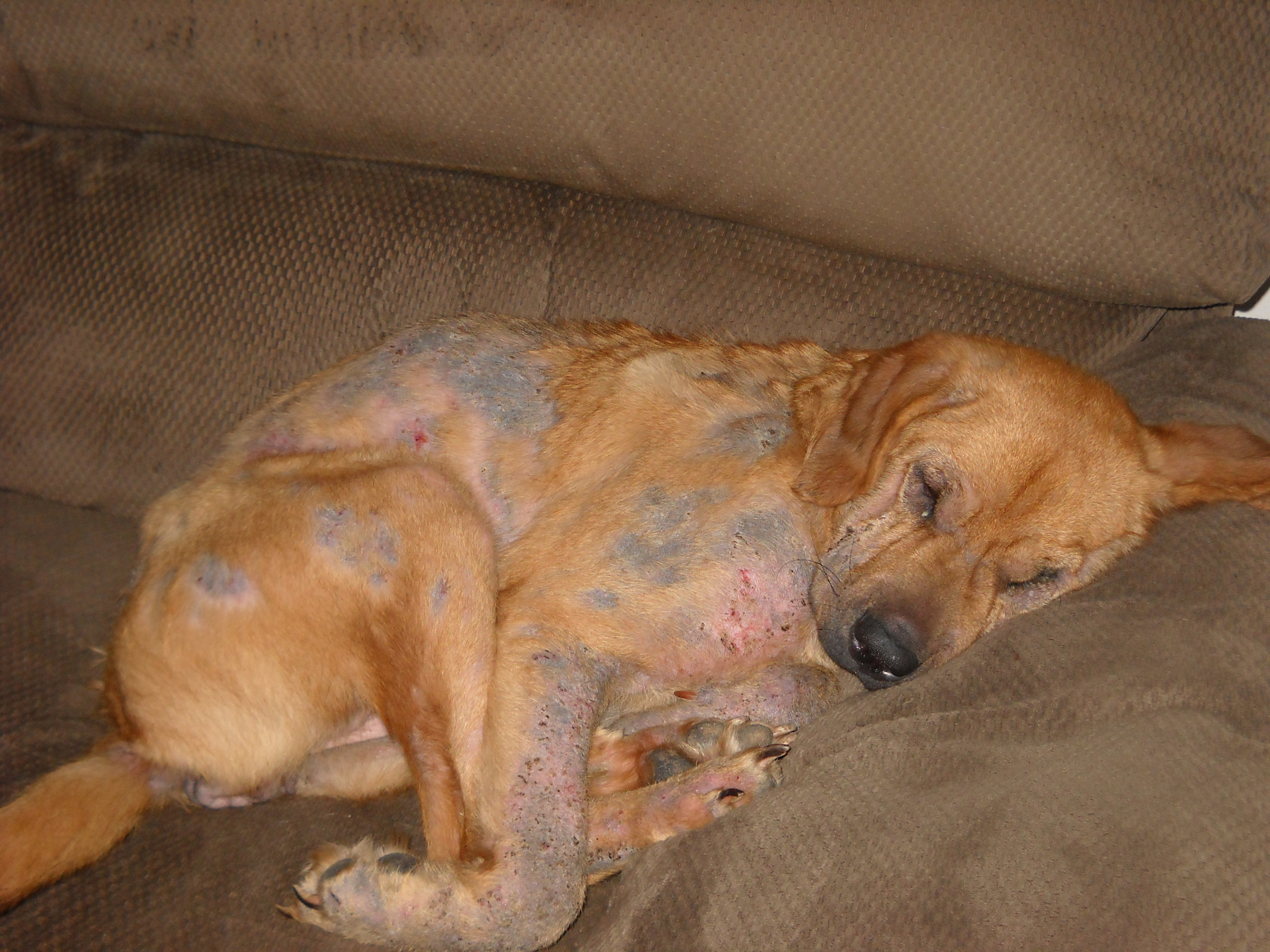
A dog suffering from a severe instance of demodicosis.

The species is known to cause demodicosis following intense proliferation into the pilosebaceous glands which host the mite. Demodicosis is characterized by folliculitis, furunculosis, erythema, hyperpigmentation, alopecia, comedones, and a distinct unpleasant odor. While sarcoptic mange similarly involves the harmful infestation of parasitic mites, infestations of D. injai and other Demodex mites differ in that they are not considered contagious and also tend to be of greater severity. Historically, submerging a dog in motor oil was a common pseudoscientific treatment for demodicosis; however, this practice risks damage to the kidney and liver, while also failing to treat mange, and is therefore discouraged by veterinarians.

The related species, Demodex canis, is the primary cause of demodectic mange in canines. Demodicosis primarily driven by an infestation of D. injai differs significantly from the most prevalent form of demodicosis. D. injai is observed to infest older adults in a manner uncommonly seen with most instances of demodicosis. Infestations of D. injai are also distinguished by the presence of additional symptoms not typically associated with demodicosis. These include ulcers, hematic crusts (more commonly known as scabs), long-term bleeding, and extremely greasy fur as a result of seborrhea. In some cases, seborrhea-induced keratosis had fully adhered to the skin and fur. D. injai-caused demodicosis is more frequently comorbid with other skin conditions, such as atopic dermatitis. Despite these differences, infestations of D. injai can be treated the same as instances of demodicosis caused by D. canis.

Unlike other canine-infesting Demodex species, D. injai is observed to have a preference for specific breeds of dog; among specimens collected from domestic dogs, the species is particularly common among terriers. The association between D. injai and terriers has been observed since the earliest documentation of the mite. In terriers, the mite's presence is often localized in the dorsal trunk of the dog's body.

D. injai has a cosmopolitan distribution, with specimens being found inhabiting canines from the United States, Poland, Romania, and India.
