= Lotilaner =

Chemical compound

Clinical data
- Trade names: Credelio, Xdemvy, others
- Other names: TP-03
- AHFS/Drugs.com: Monograph
- License data: US DailyMed: Lotilaner
- Routes of administration: By mouth, eye drops
- Drug class: Antiparasitic
- ATC code: S01AX25 (WHO) QP53BE04 (WHO)

Legal status
- Legal status: US: ℞-only; EU: Rx-only

Identifiers
- IUPAC name: 3-Methyl-N-[2-oxo-2-(2,2,2-trifluoroethylamino)ethyl]-5-[(5S)-5-(3,4,5-trichlorophenyl)-5-(trifluoromethyl)-4H-1,2-oxazol-3-yl]thiophene-2-carboxamide
- CAS Number: 1369852-71-0
- PubChem CID: 76959255
- DrugBank: DB17992
- ChemSpider: 32699771
- UNII: HEH4938D7K
- KEGG: D11212
- ChEBI: CHEBI:229657
- ChEMBL: ChEMBL3707310
- CompTox Dashboard (EPA): DTXSID701027551

Chemical and physical data
- Formula: C_{20}H_{14}Cl_{3}F_{6}N_{3}O_{3}S
- Molar mass: 596.75 g·mol^{−1}
- 3D model (JSmol): Interactive image
- SMILES: Cc1cc(C2=NO[C@@](c3cc(Cl)c(Cl)c(Cl)c3)(C(F)(F)F)C2)sc1C(=O)NCC(=O)NCC(F)(F)F
- InChI: InChI=1S/C20H14Cl3F6N3O3S/c1-8-2-13(36-16(8)17(34)30-6-14(33)31-7-19(24,25)26)12-5-18(35-32-12,20(27,28)29)9-3-10(21)15(23)11(22)4-9/h2-4H,5-7H2,1H3,(H,30,34)(H,31,33)/t18-/m0/s1; Key:HDKWFBCPLKNOCK-SFHVURJKSA-N

Lotilaner, sold under the brand name Xdemvy, is an ectoparasiticide (anti-parasitic) medication used for the treatment of blepharitis (inflammation of the eyelid) caused by infestation by Demodex (tiny mites). It is used as an eye drop.

It was approved for medical use in the United States in July 2023. The US Food and Drug Administration (FDA) considers it to be a first-in-class medication.

Lotilaner is a member of the isoxazoline family of compounds.

== Medical uses ==
Lotilaner is indicated for the treatment of Demodex blepharitis. It had been first used in veterinary medicine against fleas and ticks, and later for Demodex mites.

== Veterinary uses ==
Lotilaner, sold under the brand name Credelio among others, is a veterinary medication used to control fleas and ticks in dogs and cats. It is indicated for the treatment and prevention of flea infestations (Ctenocephalides felis) and for the treatment and control of tick infestations including lone star tick (Amblyomma americanum), American dog tick (Dermacentor variabilis), black-legged tick (Ixodes scapularis), and brown dog tick (Rhipicephalus sanguineus). It is taken by mouth.

Lotilaner in combination with milbemycin oxime is sold under the brand name Credelio Plus. It is used in dogs to treat concurrent infestations with parasites living outside (ticks and/or fleas) and inside (worms) the animal's body.

Lotilaner (brand Lotimax) is used for the treatment of flea, tick, and mite infestations in dogs, including treatment of demodicosis (caused by Demodex canis).

== Mechanism of action ==
Lotilaner paralyzes and kills parasites by interfering with the way that signals are passed between their nerve cells.

Lotilaner is a gamma-aminobutyric acid (GABA)-gated chloride channel inhibitor selective for arthropods. Inhibition of these GABA chloride channels causes a paralytic action in the target organism leading to its death. Lotilaner is not an inhibitor of mammalian GABA mediated chloride channels when tested at up to 30 μM (18 μg/mL) in vitro (approximately 1100 times the RHOD).

== Legal status ==
In March 2024, the Committee for Veterinary Medicinal Products (CVMP) of the European Medicines Agency adopted a positive opinion, recommending the granting of a marketing authorization for the veterinary medicinal product Lotimax, Chewable tablet, intended for use in dogs. The applicant for this veterinary medicinal product is Elanco GmbH. Lotimax was approved for medical use in the European Union in April 2024.

== Research ==
Tarsus Pharmaceuticals has conducted phase II studies of lotilaner as a remedy to prevent tick bites in humans.
