= Isoxazoline =

- 2-isoxazoline

- 3-isoxazoline

- 4-isoxazoline

Names
- Systematic IUPAC name Respective to images: 4,5-Dihydroisoxazole; 2,5-Dihydroisoxazole; 2,3-Dihydroisoxazole
- Other names Respective to images: Δ2-isoxazoline; Δ3-isoxazoline; Δ4-isoxazoline

Identifiers
CAS Number	2-isoxazoline: 504-73-4; 3-isoxazoline: 214059-36-6; 4-isoxazoline: 6569-19-3
3D model (JSmol)	2-isoxazoline: Interactive image; 3-isoxazoline: Interactive image; 4-isoxazoline: Interactive image
ChEBI	CHEBI:87553
ChemSpider	2-isoxazoline: 10609312; 4-isoxazoline: 10609256
PubChem CID	2-isoxazoline: 12304501; 3-isoxazoline: 21865306; 4-isoxazoline: 19350417
CompTox Dashboard (EPA)	2-isoxazoline: DTXSID90486713; 4-isoxazoline: DTXSID60598271
- InChI: 2-isoxazoline: InChI=1S/C3H5NO/c1-2-4-5-3-1/h2H,1,3H2 Key: WEQPBCSPRXFQQS-UHFFFAOYSA-N; 3-isoxazoline: InChI=1S/C3H5NO/c1-2-4-5-3-1/h1-2,4H,3H2 Key: OFJBYLCQNJHFMI-UHFFFAOYSA-N; 4-isoxazoline: InChI=1S/C3H5NO/c1-2-4-5-3-1/h1,3-4H,2H2 Key: FJRPOHLDJUJARI-UHFFFAOYSA-N
- SMILES: 2-isoxazoline: C1CON=C1; 3-isoxazoline: C1CONC=1; 4-isoxazoline: C1=CONC1

Properties
Chemical formula	C_{3}H_{5}NO
Molar mass	71.079 g·mol^{−1}
- Except where otherwise noted, data are given for materials in their standard state (at 25 °C [77 °F], 100 kPa). Infobox references

Isoxazoline is a five-membered heterocyclic chemical compound, containing one atom each of oxygen and nitrogen which are located adjacent to one another. The ring was named in-line with the Hantzsch–Widman nomenclature. Isoxazolines are structural isomers of the more common oxazolines and exist in three different isomers depending on the location of the double bond. The relatively weak N-O bond makes isoxazolines prone to ring-opening and rearrangement reactions.

== Uses ==
There are thousands of compounds containing isoxazoline rings, which are described to have a particular use. A number of naturally occurring isoxazolines with possible anti-cancer activity are produced by marine sponges.

=== Isoxazoline insecticide ===
The isoxazoline class of insecticides was discovered by Nissan. They act by allosterically modulating GABA-gated chloride channels (IRAC group 30) and glutamate-gated chloride channels; this decreases influx of chloride into the post-synaptic neuron, leading to hyperexcitation of the neuron, and paralysis of the parasite.

Fluralaner and lotilaner are used against fleas in both dogs and cats, whereas afoxolaner and sarolaner are only approved for dogs, and esafoxolaner is currently only approved for cats. In 2018, the U.S. FDA issued a drug safety communication regarding post-marketing reports of neurological side effects in cats and dogs taking isoxazoline-containing flea & tick medications.

Lotilaner is also the first isoxazoline approved for human use as Lotilaner eye drops, sold under the brand name Xdemvy. This medication is approved for treatment of blepharitis (inflammation of the eyelid) caused by infestation by Demodex (tiny mites).

Fluxametamide and isocycloseram are used as agricultural insecticides.

== Synthesis ==
2-Isoxazolines are generally produced by the 1,3-dipolar cycloaddition of nitrile oxides with alkenes. This has been applied in a diastereoselective manner in the synthesis of epothilones.

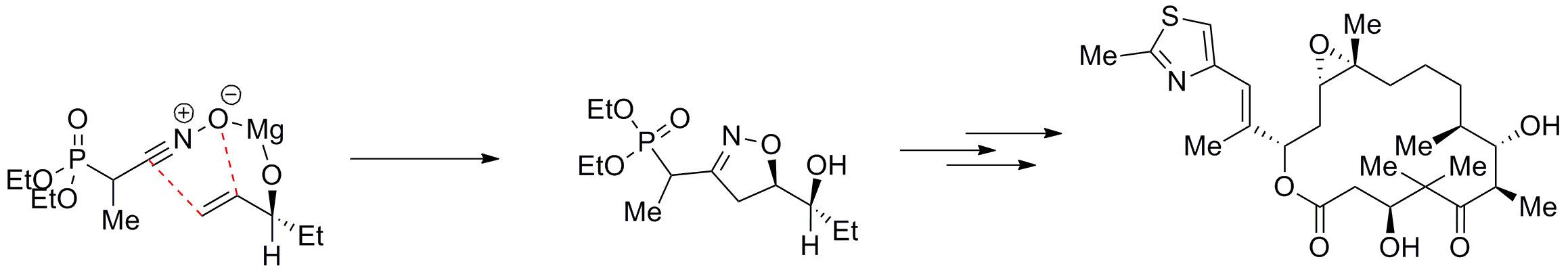

3-isoxazolines are prepared from 2-isoxazolines via their N-methylation to form 2-isoxazolinium salts, followed by nucleophilic attack and deprotonation.

4-Isoxazolines are most commonly produced by (3+2) cycloaddition between a nitrone and an alkyne. This can be considered an extension of the more common nitrone-olefin (3+2) cycloaddition used for creating isoxazolidines.

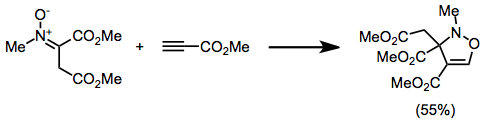
500pxg

== See also ==
- Isoxazole
- 1,2-Benzisoxazole
