= Demodex cyonis =

Scientific classification
- Kingdom: Animalia
- Phylum: Arthropoda
- Subphylum: Chelicerata
- Class: Arachnida
- Order: Trombidiformes
- Family: Demodecidae
- Genus: Demodex
- Species: D. cyonis

Binomial name
- Demodex cyonis Morita, Ohmi, Kiwaki, Ike & Nagata, 2018

Species of mite

Demodex cyonis is a species of Demodex mite first circumscribed in 2018 after being detected in the earwax of a dog with otitis externa in Saitama Prefecture, Japan, in July 2010. It was determined to be a new species based on morphological characters including its opisthosoma length being shorter than one-half its body length, differentiating it from the other species in domestic dogs, D. canis and D. injai, and similar “short-bodied species” such as D. cornei. It is morphologically most similar to D. equi and D. acutipes. The specific epithet cyonis is derived from the Greek word for domestic dog, κύων, the first observed host animal.

== Life cycle ==
Most life stages of D. cyonis, including eggs, were found in earwax, whereas juvenile and adult mites were only detected in the outer ear during periods other than the peak infestation period, suggesting that the original habitat site of D. cyonis is the external auditory canal but it can expand to the outer skin in aggravated cases.
