= Demodex bovis =

Scientific classification
- Domain: Eukaryota
- Kingdom: Animalia
- Phylum: Arthropoda
- Subphylum: Chelicerata
- Class: Arachnida
- Order: Trombidiformes
- Family: Demodecidae
- Genus: Demodex
- Species: D. bovis

Binomial name
- Demodex bovis Stiles, 1982

Species of mite

Demodex bovis, also known as the cattle follicle mite, usually causes demodicosis, or demodectic mange, in cattle. This disease is common in tropical areas and is not usually found in temperate environments. Demodicosis is characterized by the formation of papules and nodules over the cattle's skin. These lesions most commonly occur on the neck, shoulders, and armpit of cattle; however, sometimes they also appear on the udder. This condition is often found in cattle with increased stress from pregnancy or lactation. Natural and acquired immunity can cause a decrease in the number of mites infesting a cow, as well as decreasing the severity of a cow's symptoms.

Demodicosis occurs when female mites lay eggs in hair follicles. Each follicle may contain hundreds or thousands of mites, which leads to the formation of skin papules and nodules. These papules and nodules, or bumps beneath the skin, can be felt even before they can be seen. Typically, the papules and nodules last for a month and then are replaced with new ones. They typically are found in the greatest numbers during spring and summer. Their size can range from as small as a pinhead to as large as a chicken egg. The larger ones are formed when the cysts grow in size, forming granulomatous nodules, characterized by the blocking of the opening of the follicle by mites, keratin, and other remnants. These large cysts can burst, which causes open wounds to form. The thick, pus-like substance that comes out of these sores contains D. bovis, which can be spread to other animals. Another way mites can be spread is when female mites leave the follicle they are in and go lay eggs in a new follicle. This form of transfer can spread the condition to different follicles on an already infected cow, as well as to other cows and animals through copulation or other physical contact. For instance, mites may be transmitted to calves within a few days of nursing, when the shoulders and hips of calves contact the infected mother.

The burst nodules and papules can damage the cattle's skin, which results in economic losses due to problems with leather production.
