= Demodex microti =

Scientific classification
- Kingdom: Animalia
- Phylum: Arthropoda
- Subphylum: Chelicerata
- Class: Arachnida
- Order: Trombidiformes
- Family: Demodecidae
- Genus: Demodex
- Species: D. microti

Binomial name
- Demodex microti Izdebska & Rolbiecki, 2013

Species of mite

Demodex microti is a hair follicle mite from the skin of the genital area of the common vole, Microtus arvalis.

== Taxonomy ==
D. microti was initially described in studies of genital mites in Microtus arvalis. The species was distinguished as a unique species in 2013 based on the morphology of its larval development.
