= Demodex gapperi =

Scientific classification
- Domain: Eukaryota
- Kingdom: Animalia
- Phylum: Arthropoda
- Subphylum: Chelicerata
- Class: Arachnida
- Order: Trombidiformes
- Family: Demodecidae
- Genus: Demodex
- Species: D. gapperi

Binomial name
- Demodex gapperi Nutting, Emejuaiwe & Tisdel, 1971

Species of mite

Demodex gapperi is a hair follicle mite found in the eyelids of the red-backed vole, Clethrionomys gapperi.
