= Demodex huttereri =

Scientific classification
- Domain: Eukaryota
- Kingdom: Animalia
- Phylum: Arthropoda
- Subphylum: Chelicerata
- Class: Arachnida
- Order: Trombidiformes
- Family: Demodecidae
- Genus: Demodex
- Species: D. huttereri

Binomial name
- Demodex huttereri Mertens, Lukoschus & Nutting, 1983

Species of mite

Demodex huttereri is a hair follicle mite found in the Meibomian glands of the striped field mouse, Apodemus agrarius.
