= Demodex foveolator =

Scientific classification
- Domain: Eukaryota
- Kingdom: Animalia
- Phylum: Arthropoda
- Subphylum: Chelicerata
- Class: Arachnida
- Order: Trombidiformes
- Family: Demodecidae
- Genus: Demodex
- Species: D. foveolator

Binomial name
- Demodex foveolator Bukva, 1984

Species of mite

Demodex foveolator is a hair follicle mite found in epidermal pits of the lesser white-toothed shrew, Crocidura suaveolens.

It is known from shrews caught in south Bohemia, former Czechoslovakia.
