= Demodex criceti =

Scientific classification
- Domain: Eukaryota
- Kingdom: Animalia
- Phylum: Arthropoda
- Subphylum: Chelicerata
- Class: Arachnida
- Order: Trombidiformes
- Family: Demodecidae
- Genus: Demodex
- Species: D. criceti

Binomial name
- Demodex criceti Nutting & Rauch, 1958

Species of mite

Demodex criceti is a hair follicle mite found in the epidermis of the Syrian hamster, Mesocricetus auratus.
