= Demodex leucogasteri =

Scientific classification
- Kingdom: Animalia
- Phylum: Arthropoda
- Subphylum: Chelicerata
- Class: Arachnida
- Order: Trombidiformes
- Family: Demodecidae
- Genus: Demodex
- Species: D. leucogasteri

Binomial name
- Demodex leucogasteri Hughes & Nutting, 1981

Species of mite

Demodex leucogasteri is a hair follicle mite found in the hair follicles of the grasshopper mouse, Onychomys leucogaster.

The mites were found on laboratory maintained individuals of the grasshopper mouse.
