= Demodex conicus =

Scientific classification
- Domain: Eukaryota
- Kingdom: Animalia
- Phylum: Arthropoda
- Subphylum: Chelicerata
- Class: Arachnida
- Order: Trombidiformes
- Family: Demodecidae
- Genus: Demodex
- Species: D. conicus

Binomial name
- Demodex conicus Izdebska & Rolbiecki, 2015

Species of mite

Demodex conicus is a hair follicle mite found in the ear canal of the house mouse, Mus musculus.
