= Demodex ponderosus =

Scientific classification
- Domain: Eukaryota
- Kingdom: Animalia
- Phylum: Arthropoda
- Subphylum: Chelicerata
- Class: Arachnida
- Order: Trombidiformes
- Family: Demodecidae
- Genus: Demodex
- Species: D. ponderosus

Binomial name
- Demodex ponderosus Izdebska & Rolbiecki, 2014

Species of mite

Demodex ponderosus is a hair follicle mite found on thinly haired regions (tail and paws) of the brown rat, Rattus norvegicus.
