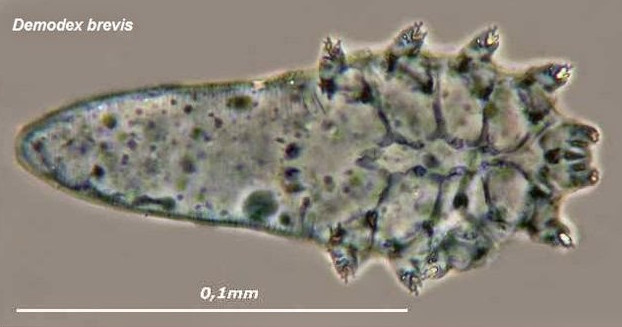

Scientific classification
- Kingdom: Animalia
- Phylum: Arthropoda
- Subphylum: Chelicerata
- Class: Arachnida
- Order: Trombidiformes
- Family: Demodecidae
- Genus: Demodex
- Species: D. brevis

Binomial name
- Demodex brevis Akbulatova, 1963

= Demodex brevis =

Species of mite

Demodex brevis is one of the two species of face mite that inhabit humans (the other being Demodex folliculorum). They are about half as long, at 0.15 to 0.2 mm (6 to 8 thousandths of an inch), as D. folliculorum, but otherwise have few differences. Most of the article on Demodex folliculorum applies equally to D. brevis.

They are usually found in the sebaceous glands of the human body. D. brevis reproduces in the sebaceous glands in the same way that D. folliculorum reproduces in the follicles. Under normal conditions, they are not harmful, and are considered commensals, whereby the mite benefits but there is no harm or benefit to the host, rather than parasites where the host is harmed, or mutualistic organisms where the host benefits. During a severe infestation, though, there may be adverse effects on the host, such as demodicosis.
