= Demodex zalophi =

Scientific classification
- Kingdom: Animalia
- Phylum: Arthropoda
- Subphylum: Chelicerata
- Class: Arachnida
- Order: Trombidiformes
- Family: Demodecidae
- Genus: Demodex
- Species: D. zalophi

Binomial name
- Demodex zalophi Dailey & Nutting, 1980

Species of mite

Demodex zalophi is a species of mite within the family Demodecidae. The species is the first demodicid to be described from marine mammals, first being documented from California sea lions in 1979. Occurrences of the species have also been recovered in captive sea lions in California, Texas, and Australia. It is known to inhabit other species of pinnipeds such as northern fur seals and is associated with causing hyperkeratosis, alopecia and puritis, with topical amitraz showing to be an effective treatment.
