= Demodex gatoi =

Scientific classification
- Domain: Eukaryota
- Kingdom: Animalia
- Phylum: Arthropoda
- Subphylum: Chelicerata
- Class: Arachnida
- Order: Trombidiformes
- Family: Demodecidae
- Genus: Demodex
- Species: D. gatoi

Binomial name
- Demodex gatoi Desch & Stewart, 1999

Species of mite

Demodex gatoi is a hair follicle mite from the skin surface of the domestic cat, Felis catus. It is the second described species of Demodex from the domestic cat, and is distinguishable from Demodex cati by being shorter and rounder.
