= Soricidex =

Scientific classification
- Kingdom: Animalia
- Phylum: Arthropoda
- Subphylum: Chelicerata
- Class: Arachnida
- Order: Trombidiformes
- Family: Demodecidae
- Genus: Soricidex; Bukva, 1982

Species
- Soricidex dimorphus

Genus of mites

Soricidex is a genus of tiny mites that live on the head and body of its host species, the common shrew (Sorex araneus). Only one species has been formally described, Soricidex dimorphus, but V. Bukva mentions two more undescribed species from his collection. S. dimorphus exhibits sexual dimorphism, a feature unseen in its family, Demodecidae.
