= Milbemycin oxime =

Chemical compound

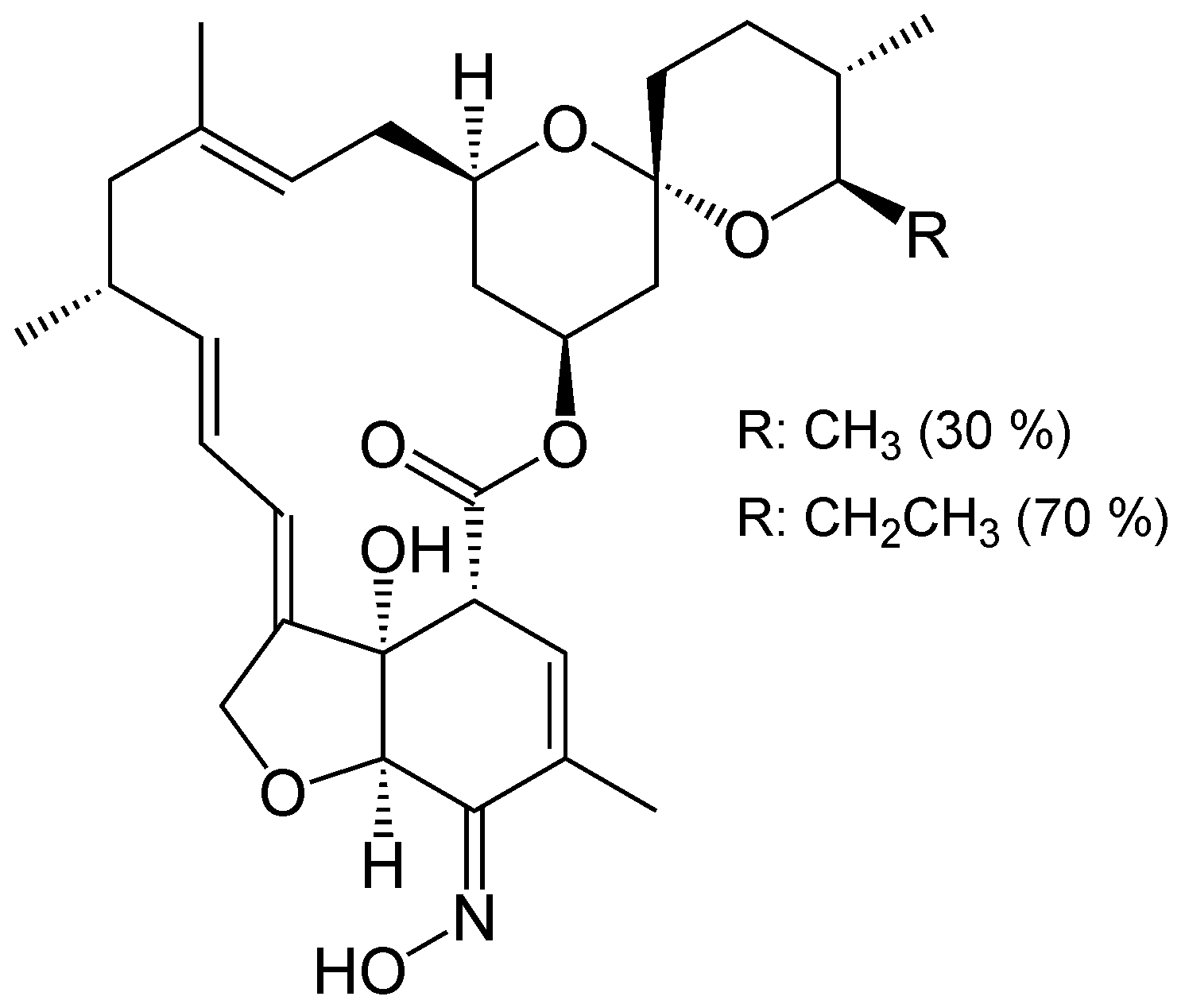

Clinical data
- Trade names: Interceptor, others
- License data: US DailyMed: Milbemycin oxime
- Routes of administration: By mouth
- ATCvet code: QP54AB01 (WHO)

Legal status
- Legal status: US: ℞-only

Pharmacokinetic data
- Bioavailability: 5–10%
- Metabolism: Liver
- Excretion: Bile duct

Identifiers
- CAS Number: 129496-10-2
- UNII: 0502PUN0GT
- ECHA InfoCard: 100.205.451

Chemical and physical data
- Formula: C_{31}H_{43}NO_{7} (30%); C_{32}H_{45}NO_{7} (70%)
- Molar mass: 541.68 g/mol (30%); 555.702 g/mol (70%)

Milbemycin oxime, sold under the brand name Interceptor among others, is a veterinary medication from the group of milbemycins, used as a broad spectrum antiparasitic. It is active against worms (anthelmintic) and mites (miticide).

== Mechanism of action ==
Milbemycins are products of fermentation by Streptomyces species. They have a similar mechanism of action, but a longer half-life than the avermectins. Milbemycin oxime is produced by Streptomyces hygroscopicus aureolacrimosus. It opens glutamate sensitive chloride channels in neurons and myocytes of invertebrates, leading to hyperpolarisation of these cells and blocking of signal transfer.

== Uses ==
Milbemycin oxime is active against a broad spectrum of nematodes. Its miticide spectrum includes Sarcoptes and Demodex. The drug is FDA-approved for prevention of heartworm in dogs and cats, although it is less potent against heartworms than ivermectin.

The substance is often combined with other parasiticides to achieve a broader spectrum of action. Such products include:

- Milbemax and Interceptor Plus (with praziquantel)
- Sentinel Flavor Tabs (with lufenuron)
- Trifexis (with spinosad)
- Nexgard Spectra (with afoxolaner)

The drug has been used in marine reef aquaria to eliminate parasitic Tegastidae arthropod infestations on captive hard coral colonies. This treatment is not selective and will also kill desired arthropods such as shrimps and crabs.

== Side effects ==
The drug is usually tolerated well, but such side effects may occur such as vomiting, phlegming, and glassy eyes.

== Society and culture ==
=== Legal status ===
In June 2025, the Committee for Veterinary Medicinal Products of the European Medicines Agency adopted a positive opinion, recommending the granting of a marketing authorization for the veterinary medicinal product Bravecto Combiuno chewable tablets intended for dogs. The applicant for this veterinary medicinal product is Intervet International B.V. Bravecto Combiuno is an antiparasitic medicinal product containing fluralaner and milbemycin oxime as active substances. Both substances exert parasiticidal activity by interacting with ligand-gated ion channels in the nervous system of various parasites such as insects, acari and helminths.
