= Juvenile cellulitis =

Uncommon disease in dogs

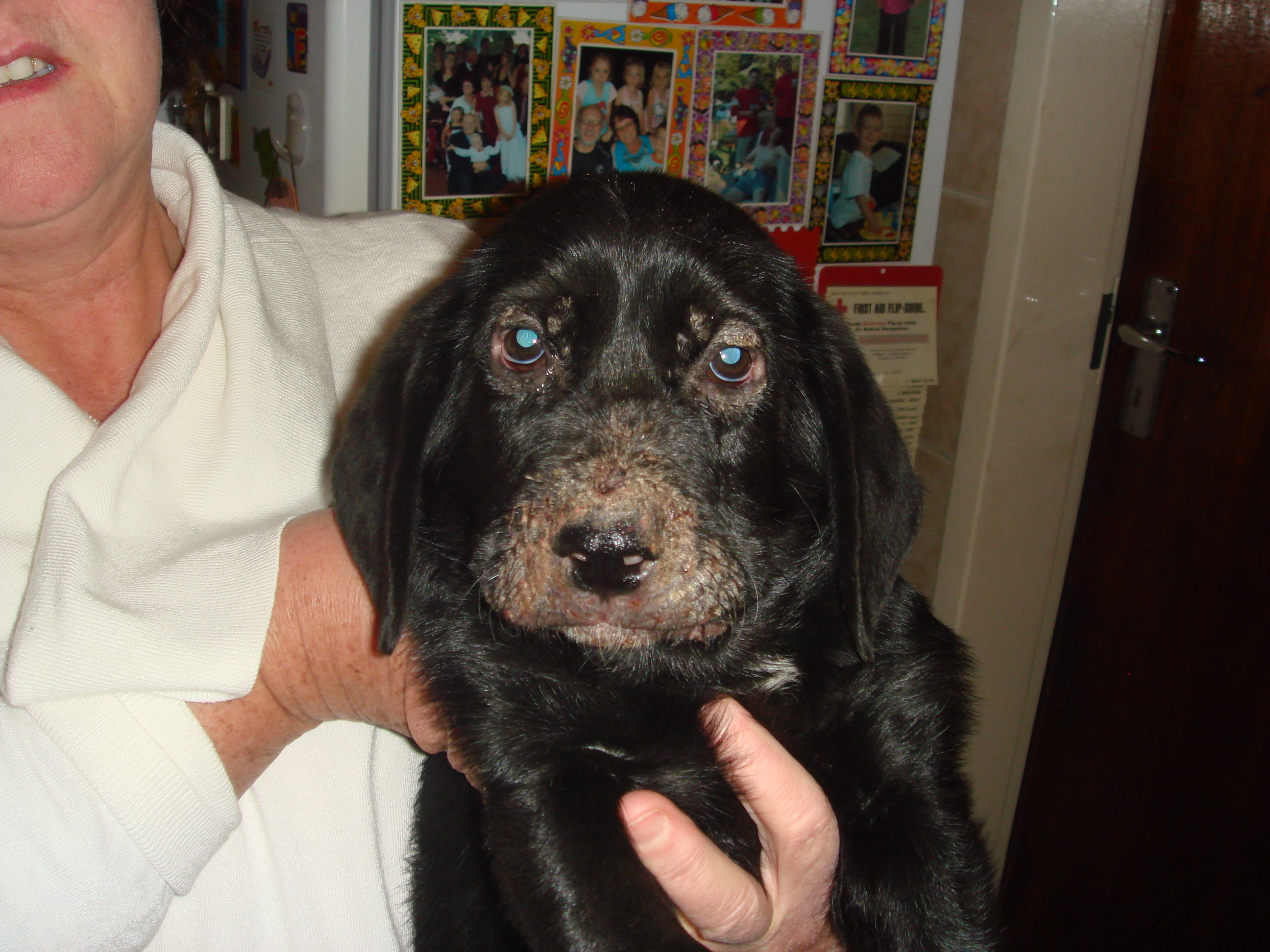
Puppy with juvenile cellulitis at 7 weeks old.

Juvenile cellulitis, also known as puppy strangles or juvenile pyoderma, is an uncommon disease of dogs. Symptoms include dermatitis, lethargy, depression and lameness. When puppies are first presented with what appears to be staphylococcal pyoderma, juvenile cellulitis, a relatively rare condition, may not be considered.

== Symptoms ==
The first symptom is a sudden onset of swelling of the face, which develops within two days into papules and pustules on the lips, nose, and around the eyes. These pustules release a purulent discharge, causing a crust to form on the skin. There is also lymphadenopathy (swelling of lymph nodes) in the main lymph nodes of the head. The feet, body, prepuce or perianal area may be affected. Pustular otitis externa can occur, with the pinnae (ear flaps) becoming thickened by edema. Affected areas are painful but not itchy. Approximately half of affected puppies have lethargy and depression. Less common symptoms include pyrexia, anorexia, and joint pain caused by sterile suppurative arthritis.

== Causes ==
The cause of juvenile cellulitis is unknown. Cytologic examination of aspirates of affected lymph nodes, pustules, abscesses, and joint fluid rarely reveal bacteria, and culture results of intact lesion are always negative for bacterial growth, suggesting a nonbacterial etiology. As signs resolve following treatment with glucocorticoids, the cause is likely to be an immune disorder.

== Diagnosis ==
Puppies are first presented with what appears to be staphylococcal pyoderma. Definitive diagnosis requires cytologic and histopathologic evaluations. Cytologic examination of papulopustular lesions of juvenile cellulitis reveals pyogranulomatous inflammation with no microorganisms and carefully performed cultures are negative. Biopsies of early lesions reveal multiple discrete or confluent granulomas and pyogranulomas consisting of clusters of large epithelioid macrophages with variably sized cores of neutrophils. Cytological analysis of joint fluid often reveals sterile suppurative arthritis.

== Treatment ==
Large doses of glucocorticoids are the treatment of choice, and are administered until the signs have resolved. In uncomplicated cases, this can take up to a month. If dogs are not treated promptly and with high doses of steroids, severe scarring may occur. If there is evidence of secondary bacterial infection, treatment with antibiotics is required.
