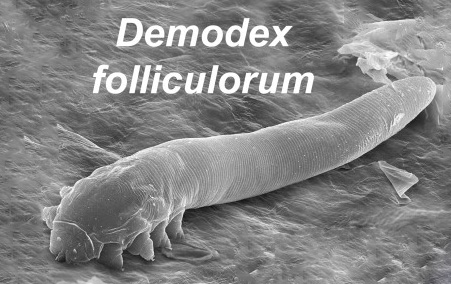

Scientific classification
- Kingdom: Animalia
- Phylum: Arthropoda
- Subphylum: Chelicerata
- Class: Arachnida
- Order: Trombidiformes
- Family: Demodecidae
- Genus: Demodex
- Species: D. folliculorum

Binomial name
- Demodex folliculorum (Simon, 1842)

Synonyms
- Acarus folliculorum Simon, 1842

= Demodex folliculorum =

Species of mite

Demodex folliculorum is a microscopic mite that can survive only on the skin of humans. Most people host D. folliculorum on their skin particularly on the face, where sebaceous glands are most concentrated. Usually, the mites are considered an example of commensalism rather than parasitism; however they can cause disease, known as demodicosis or demodex blepharitis (DB) when in high number.

== Anatomy ==
Due to being adapted to live inside hair follicles, D. folliculorum is thin and worm-like, with short legs. As an adult, D. folliculorum measures 0.3 to 0.4 mm (0.012 to 0.016 in) long. Adults have four pairs of legs; larvae and nymphs have only three pairs.

It was previously thought that D. folliculorum had a rudimentary gut but lacked an anus, so waste accumulated within the body until it dies. However, a 2022 study using electron microscopy and genetic analysis confirmed that the mites do have an anus. This discovery means that Demodex mites can excrete waste, which means that they may not be the sole cause of inflammatory skin conditions.

== Reproduction and life cycle ==
The entire life cycle of D. folliculorum takes 14–16 days. Adult mites copulate at the top of the hair follicle, near the skin surface. Eggs are deposited in the sebaceous gland inside the hair follicle. The heart-shaped egg is 0.1 mm (0.0039 in) long, and hatches into a six-legged larva. In seven days the larva develops into a mature adult, with two intervening nymph stages. The adult lives for four to six days.

== Ecology ==
D. folliculorum prefers areas where sebum production is high, and is typically found in hair follicles on the human face, generally in greater numbers around the cheeks, nose, and forehead, but also elsewhere on the face, eyelids, and ears. The mites may also be found on other parts of the body, such as the chest and buttocks.

Within the hair follicle, D. folliculorum is found above the sebaceous gland, positioned head downward, with the end of the abdomen often protruding from the hair follicle. Inhabited follicles usually contain 2–6 mites, but numbers can be greater.

In one hour, D. folliculorum can travel 8 to 16 mm (0.31 to 0.63 in); they usually travel at night.

The mites are obligate commensals of humans, and can live only on the skin; they soon dry out and die if they leave the host. Higher numbers of D. folliculorum are found in the spring and summer than at other times of year.

D. folliculorum lives alongside other microorganisms on the skin and is part of the skin’s microbial community. Its presence may influence skin health and the balance of other microorganisms, sometimes contributing to skin conditions.

== Relationship with humans ==
D. folliculorum is not found on newborn babies, but is acquired shortly after birth, most likely from maternal contact. Few mites are found on children under 10 years of age, but nearly all elderly people have them. The increasing population over time may be due to a small initial presence gradually growing over time, or may be because levels of the mite's food, sebum, increase with age.

High numbers of D. folliculorum are associated with blepharitis and acne rosacea. The mechanism by which the mites cause disease is unknown; they may physically block the hair follicle, carry disease-causing bacteria or, after death, their bodies may cause either a delayed hypersensitivity response, or an innate immune response. Controversy exists over whether high numbers of D. folliculorum cause rosacea, or whether the skin environment caused by rosacea is more hospitable to mites than normal skin, allowing them to flourish. Populations of D. folliculorum are higher in people with immunosuppression.

== Treatment and management ==
Research has shown that tea tree oil, derived from the plant Melaleuca alternifolia, has properties effective against Demodex mites. The active component, terpinen-4-ol, has been demonstrated to kill Demodex folliculorum and reduce mite populations, particularly in individuals with associated conditions such as blepharitis and rosacea. Treatment regimens often involve eyelid scrubs with diluted tea tree oil solutions or cleansers containing terpinen-4-ol, as direct application of concentrated oil may cause irritation.

== History ==
The first report of Demodex folliculorum was made by German scientist Jakob Henle in 1841, but his presentation to the Natural Sciences Society of Zurich, reported in a local newspaper, attracted little attention at the time.

In 1842, German dermatologist Gustav Simon was investigating the formation of acne pustules and blackheads using hair follicle samples under a microscope, when he noticed movement within the sample. He described himself as surprised to find a tiny "head, legs, fore and hind body" pressed between the two glass plates of the sample, and was then able to replicate his discovery with other samples. Simon gave a full report of the appearance of D. folliculorum, naming it Acarus folliculorum.

The following year, 1843, the genus was named Demodex by English scientist Richard Owen. From Simon's initial description of D. folliculorum onwards, two forms were recognized, a long form and a short form. In 1963, it was suggested by LK Akbulatova that these long and short forms were two subspecies of D. folliculorum, and that the smaller mite be named Demodex brevis, with the larger mite retaining the name D. folliculorum. It was not until 1972 that the existence of two separate species was confirmed.

== See also ==
- Demodex brevis – another species of face mite that inhabit humans.
- Human microbiome
