= Shar Pei =

Shar pei
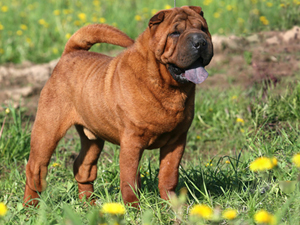
- Modern "wrinkle-mouth" shar pei
- Other names: Cantonese Shar-pei; Chinese fighting dog
- Origin: China
Traits
- Height: 44–51 cm (17–20 in)
- Weight: 16–29 kg (35–64 lb)
- Coat: Short, harsh, and bristly
- Colour: All solid colours except white
Kennel club standards
- China Kennel Union: standard
- American Kennel Club: standard
- Fédération Cynologique Internationale: standard

The Shar Pei (Chinese: 沙皮; Cantonese Yale: shā pèih; pinyin: shā pí; lit. 'sand skin') is a dog breed from southern China. Traditionally kept as a property guardian, the Shar Pei was driven to the brink of extinction in the 20th century. The breed is known in the West for its deep wrinkles, while a traditional less wrinkled form is maintained in Hong Kong.

== History ==
Chinese sculpture of a Shar Pei dog from the Eastern Han dynasty c. 100 CE Kept in the Indianapolis Museum of Art.

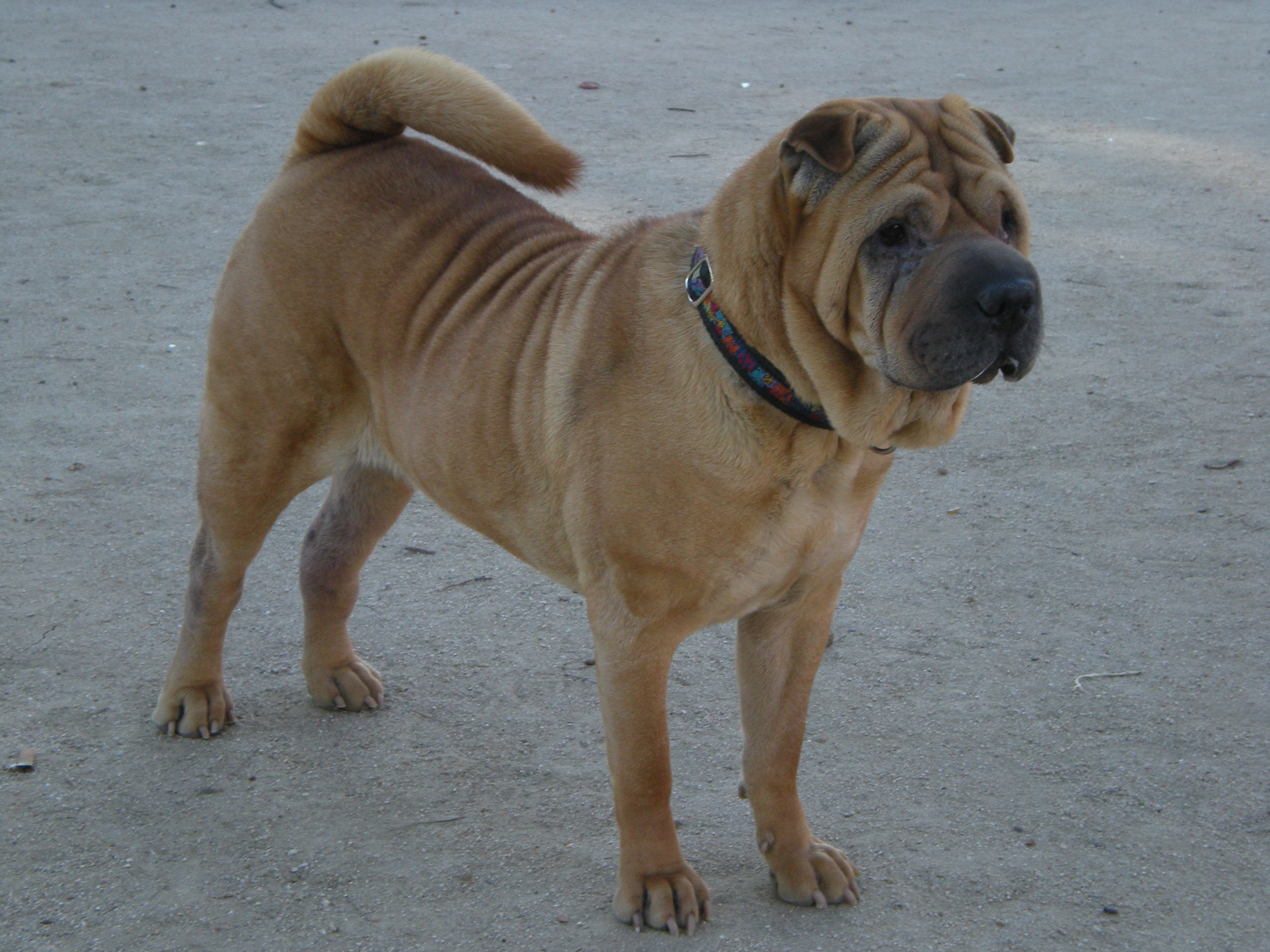
"Wrinkle-mouth" shar pei

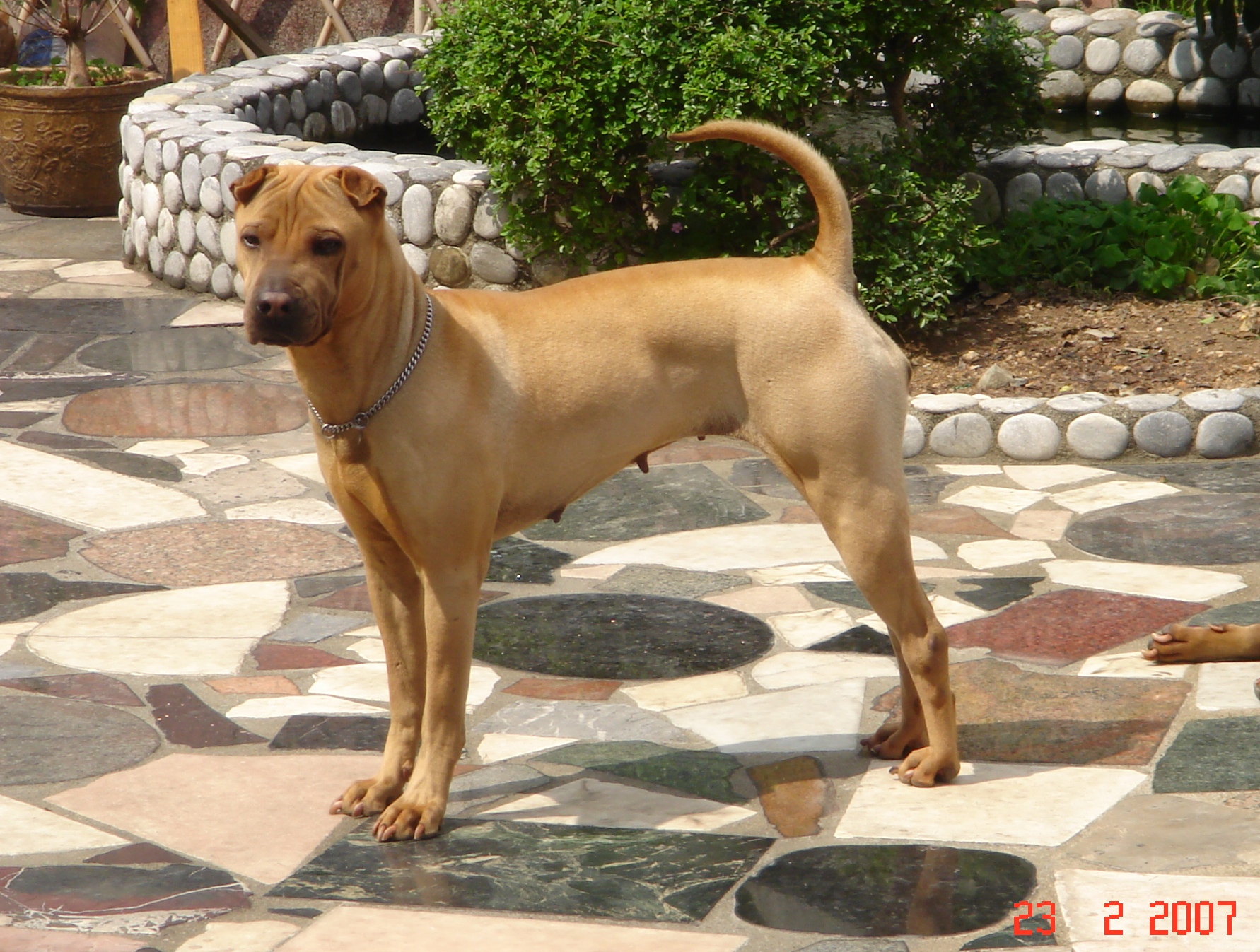
"Bone-mouth" shar pei

There are no records indicating the origins of the Shar Pei, although it closely resembles effigies of an un-wrinkled type of guard dog kept in southern China during the Han dynasty; some believe the modern breed, along with the Chow Chow, descends from these dogs. The breed has been identified as a basal breed that predates the emergence of the modern breeds in the 19th century.

The Shar Pei was once very popular, but war and political turmoil in China in the 20th century took its toll on the breed and by the 1970s it was close to extinction. In 1973 a Hong Kong businessman named Matgo Law appealed to the international community, in particular the American Kennel Club, to help save the breed; by 1978 the breed was named by The Guinness Book of Records as the world's rarest breed, with only 60 remaining. The resultant publicity led to great demand in the United States for examples of the breed, and unscrupulous breeders in Hong Kong, Macau and Taiwan took to crossing their remaining purebred animals with other breeds including the Bull Terrier, pug and bulldog, and selling the offspring to unwitting American buyers. The results of the crossings led to a dog with a much fleshier mouth than the original breed, these dogs became known as "meat-mouth" Shar Peis, while the original dogs are called "bone-mouth" Shar Peis.

The cause of saving the breed was taken up in the United States by enthusiastic breeders using the dogs smuggled there in the 1970s, a breed club was founded and it received American Kennel Club recognition in 1992, with breed standard specifying a meat-mouth type dog. Some breeders in Hong Kong maintain the traditional bone-mouth type, although it is estimated only 50 to 100 examples of this type remain.

In the United States, a number of breeders have selectively bred Shar Peis for a smaller size, creating what they call the "miniature shar pei", much to the opposition of many breeders of traditionally sized Shar Peis. Standing to a maximum 40 centimetres (16 in), the miniature Shar Pei is bred for both for its smaller size and increased wrinkles.

== Description ==
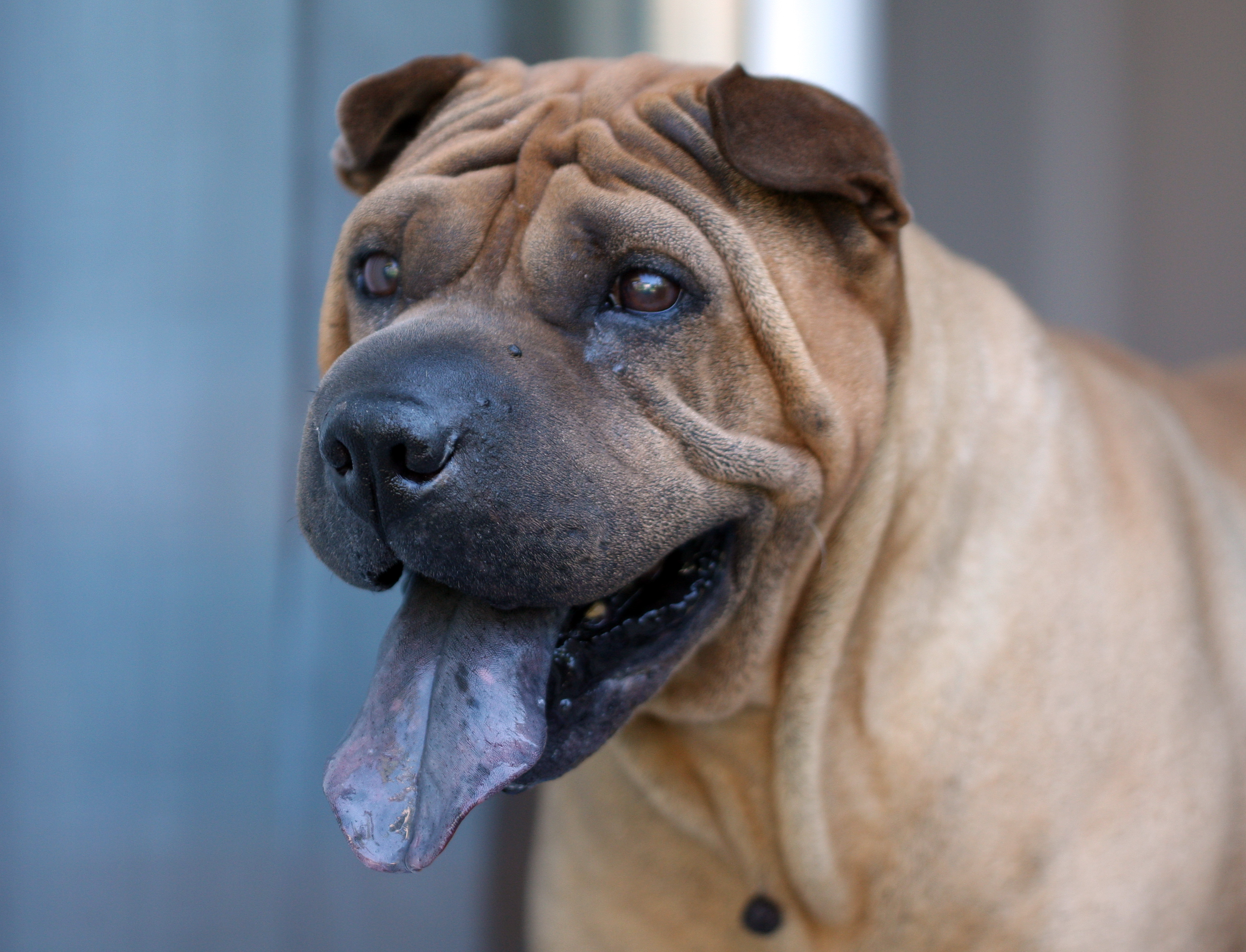
"Meat-mouth" shar pei showing the blue-black tongue

The Shar Pei is a short-coated medium-sized breed of dog, renowned for its excessively wrinkled skin. The breed resembles many dog breeds from the mastiff family; however, it is most closely related to spitz breeds, with the Chow Chow being its closest relative. This is most clearly seen with the two breeds both possessing unique blue-black tongues. This dog falls within the same genetic group as the Chow-Chow, the Akita, the Shiba Inu, the Malamute and the Greenland Dog.

Adult Shar Peis typically stand between 44 and 51 centimetres (17 and 20 in) and weigh between 16 and 20 kilograms (35 and 44 lb). They have a short and very harsh coat that can be any solid colour except white, although black, red, fawn and cream are the most common.

The Chinese breed standard states they have clam-shell ears, butterfly nose, melon-shaped head, grandmotherly face, water buffalo neck, horse's buttocks and dragon's legs. The breed's head is relatively large compared to its body with a broad muzzle that usually darker than the rest of the coat and well padded causing a bulge at its base, the ears are set wide apart and are small and triangular, and the eyes are set very deeply into the folds of skin on the head. The breed has straight, well boned, muscular legs below sloping shoulders and a medium length broad tail that is curled over their back in a manner typical of spitz-type dogs.

== Health ==
=== Life expectancy ===
A 2024 study in the UK found a life expectancy of 10.6 years for the breed compared to an average of 12.7 for purebreeds and 12 for crossbreeds.

=== Skin conditions ===
A review of over 23,000 records from the University Veterinary Teaching Hospital of the University of Sydney found 7.7% of Shar Peis to have atopic dermatitis, higher than the overall of 3.1%. A review of records from over 600 US hospitals found 4% of Shar Peis under the age of 2 to suffer from juvenile onset demodicosis compared to just 0.58% overall. A study in the UK found the Shar-pei to have an overall prevalence of 0.9% compared to 0.17% for the general population. For juvenile onset demodicosis (under 2 years) the Shar Pei had a prevalence of 1.8% compared to 0.48%. For adult onset demodicosis (over 4 years) the Shar Pei had a prevalence of 0.6% compared to 0.05%. The Shar Pei is predisposed to several skin conditions including: allergic skin disease, cutaneous mucinosis, intertrigo, otitis externa, and vasculopathy.

=== Familial Shar Pei Fever ===
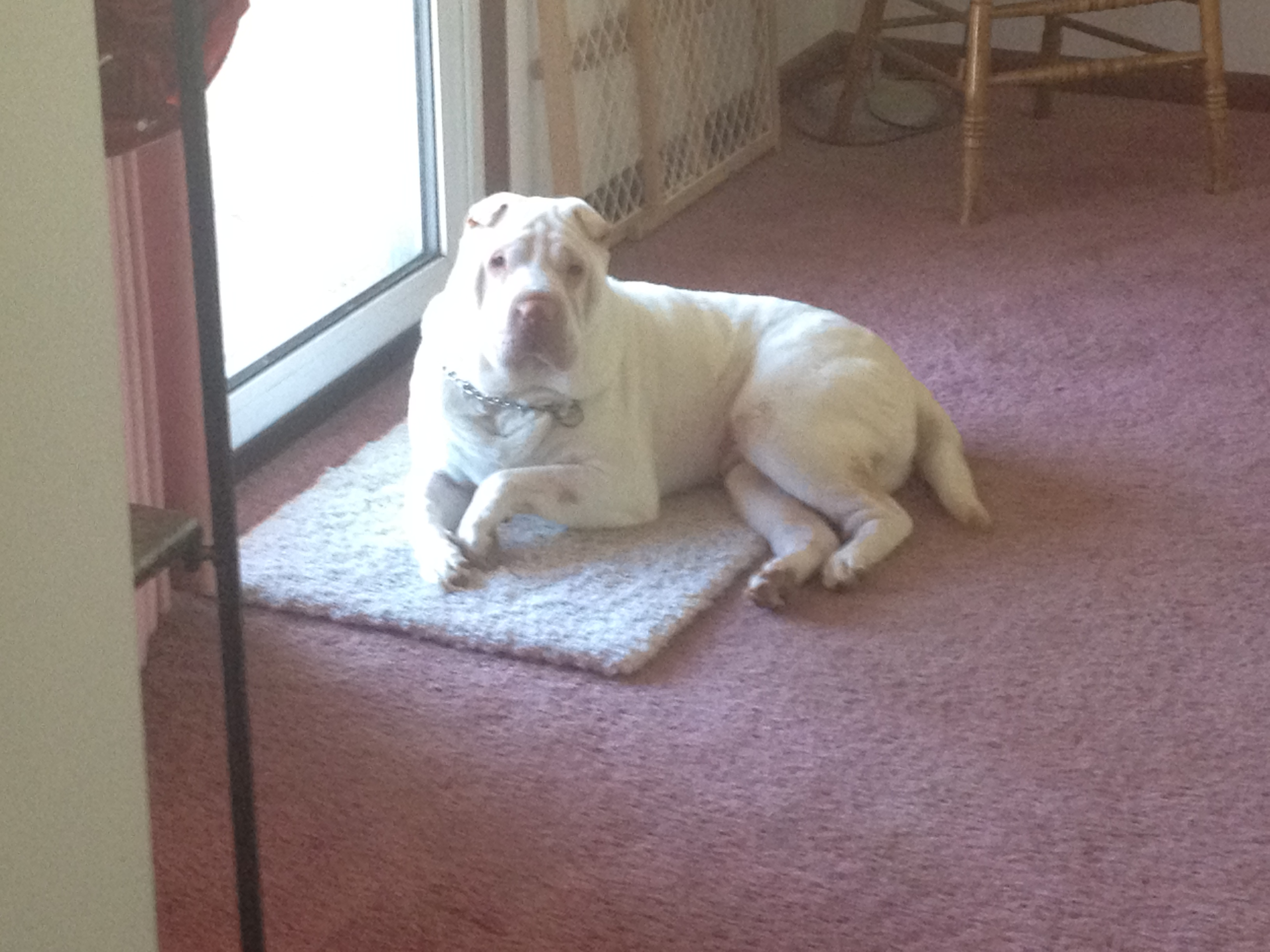
A Shar Pei with Shar Pei Fever

Shar Pei fever (also called familial Shar Pei fever or FSF) is a condition seen in Shar Pei characterized by recurring fever and swelling of the hocks. It is similar to familial Mediterranean fever in humans. The cause is unknown, but it is thought to be inherited. Shar Pei fever can result in renal and liver failure through accumulation of amyloid in those organs (amyloidosis).

Affected Shar Pei have an elevated level of interleukin 6, and this leads to an accumulation of acute phase proteins in the body during the fevers. The acute phase proteins are broken down to form type AA amyloid, which deposits in the kidneys and less so in the liver, spleen, and gastrointestinal tract. This eventually leads to kidney or liver failure by the age of six years.

The symptoms of Shar Pei fever include fever, swelling, and pain in the hocks that usually resolves within two days. The swelling in the hocks is easily recognizable—the hock will resemble a flaccid waterballoon, rather than stiff swelling following a sprain or break. The symptoms can be treated with NSAIDs such as carprofen. Kidney and liver failure cannot be treated except by the conventional manner usually used for those diseases. Prevention of amyloidosis is sometimes used in dogs with recurring episodes of Shar Pei fever. Colchicine and dimethyl sulfoxide are most commonly used. The disease is associated with the Western type and it is estimated that 23% of dogs in the US are affected.

=== Other conditions ===
The Shar Pei is prediposed to hypothyroidism.

A common problem is a painful eye condition, entropion, in which the eyelashes curl inward, irritating the eye. If untreated, it can cause blindness. This condition can be fixed by surgery—"tacking" up the eyelids so they will not roll onto the eyeball for puppies, or surgically removing extra skin in adolescent and older shar peis.

Vitamin B12 deficiency is a common problem in the Shar Pei and is suspected to be hereditary.

A review of over 250,000 elbow scans in North America found a 24% of Shar Peis over the age of 2 to suffer from elbow dysplasia.

The Shar Pei is one of the more commonly affected breeds for primary open angle glaucoma. An autosomal recessive mutation of the ADAMTS17 gene is responsible for the condition in the breed. A review of hospital records in North America found 4.4% of Shar-Peis to suffer from glaucoma compared to 0.71% for mixed-breeds.

The Shar Pei is one of the two most commonly affected breeds for hiatal hernia.

== See also ==
- List of dog breeds
