= Isoxazolidine =

Identifiers
CAS Number	504-72-3
3D model (JSmol)	Interactive image
ChEBI	CHEBI:50311
ChemSpider	120107
PubChem CID	136333
CompTox Dashboard (EPA)	DTXSID90198445
- InChI: InChI=1S/C3H7NO/c1-2-4-5-3-1/h4H,1-3H2 Key: CIISBYKBBMFLEZ-UHFFFAOYSA-N
- SMILES: C1CNOC1

Properties
Chemical formula	C_{3}H_{7}NO
Molar mass	73.095 g·mol^{−1}
Appearance	colorless liquid
Boiling point	59 °C (138 °F; 332 K)
- Except where otherwise noted, data are given for materials in their standard state (at 25 °C [77 °F], 100 kPa). Infobox references

Isoxazolidine is the organic compound with the formula (CH_{2})_{3}(NH)O. It is the parent of a family of compounds called Isoxazolidines, which are saturated C_{3}NO heterocyclic rings where the nitrogen and oxygen occupy adjacent positions (1 and 2). They are the saturated analogues of Isoxazoles, and they are isomeric with oxazolidines, where the N and O are separated by one carbon.

Isoxazolidines can be produced by the nitrone-olefin (3+2) cycloaddition reaction.

They represent precursors to 1,3-aminoalcohols. The series Organic Syntheses provides detailed procedures that yield isoxazolidines, e.g., from styrene and N-phenylmaleimide. Some isoxazolidines are of medicinal interest.
