= Committee for Veterinary Medicinal Products =

European Medicines Agency committee

The Committee for Veterinary Medicinal Products (CVMP) is the European Medicines Agency's committee responsible for elaborating the agency's opinions on all issues regarding veterinary medicines.

== See also ==
- Committee for Medicinal Products for Human Use
