= Fluralaner =

Chemical compound

Clinical data
- Pronunciation: /ˌflʊərəˈlænər/ FLOOR-ə-LAN-ər
- Trade names: Bravecto, Exzolt
- Other names: A1443, AH252723; 4-[(5RS)-5-(3,5-Dichlorophenyl)-4,5-dihydro-5-(trifluoromethyl)-1,2-oxazol-3-yl]-N-[2-oxo-2-(2,2,2-trifluoroethylamino)ethyl]-o-toluamide
- License data: US DailyMed: Fluralaner
- Routes of administration: By mouth
- ATCvet code: QP53BE02 (WHO)

Legal status
- Legal status: AU: S5 (Caution); CA: ℞-only; US: ℞-only; EU: Rx-only; RU: Rx-only; OTC

Pharmacokinetic data
- Bioavailability: 20–27%; reduced in the fasted state
- Elimination half-life: 9.3–16.2 days

Identifiers
- IUPAC name: 4-[5-(3,5-dichlorophenyl)-5-(trifluoromethyl)-4''H''-1,2-oxazol-3-yl]-2-methyl-''N''-{2-oxo-2-[(2,2,2-trifluoroethyl)amino]ethyl}benzamide
- CAS Number: 864731-61-3
- PubChem CID: 25144319
- ChemSpider: 29398949
- UNII: WSH8393RM5
- KEGG: D10402
- ChEMBL: ChEMBL2364610
- CompTox Dashboard (EPA): DTXSID90235581
- ECHA InfoCard: 100.215.812

Chemical and physical data
- Formula: C_{22}H_{17}Cl_{2}F_{6}N_{3}O_{3}
- Molar mass: 556.29 g·mol^{−1}
- 3D model (JSmol): Interactive image
- Chirality: Racemic mixture
- SMILES: Cc1cc(C2=NOC(c3cc(Cl)cc(Cl)c3)(C(F)(F)F)C2)ccc1C(=O)NCC(=O)NCC(F)(F)F
- InChI: InChI=1S/C22H17Cl2F6N3O3/c1-11-4-12(2-3-16(11)19(35)31-9-18(34)32-10-21(25,26)27)17-8-20(36-33-17,22(28,29)30)13-5-14(23)7-15(24)6-13/h2-7H,8-10H2,1H3,(H,31,35)(H,32,34); Key:MLBZKOGAMRTSKP-UHFFFAOYSA-N

Fluralaner (INN), sold under the brand name Bravecto among others, is a systemic insecticide and acaricide that is administered orally or topically.

== Mode of action ==
Fluralaner inhibits γ-aminobutyric acid (GABA)-gated chloride channels (GABA_{A} receptors) and L-glutamate-gated chloride channels (GluCls). Potency of fluralaner is comparable to fipronil (a related GABA-antagonist insecticide and acaricide).

== Society and culture ==
=== Legal status ===
The US Food and Drug Administration (FDA) approved it for flea treatment in dogs in May 2014, and approved the combination of fluralaner and moxidectin (Bravecto Plus) as a topical treatment for cats in November 2019. The EU approved fluralaner in March 2014. Australia approved it for the treatment and prevention of ticks and fleas on dogs in January 2015. For treating mites in chickens, a solution for use in drinking water is available under the brand name Exzolt and was approved for use in the EU in 2017.

Bravecto 1-Month was approved by the FDA in November 2024 for the addition of the indication for the treatment and control of Haemaphysalis longicornis (Asian longhorned tick) infestations for one month in dogs and puppies eight weeks of age and older, and weighing 4.4 pounds (2.0 kg) or greater.

In June 2025, the Committee for Veterinary Medicinal Products of the European Medicines Agency adopted a positive opinion, recommending the granting of a marketing authorization for the veterinary medicinal product Bravecto Combiuno chewable tablets intended for dogs. The applicant for this veterinary medicinal product is Intervet International B.V. Bravecto Combiuno is an antiparasitic medicinal product containing fluralaner and milbemycin oxime as active substances. Both substances exert parasiticidal activity by interacting with ligand-gated ion channels in the nervous system of various parasites such as insects, acari and helminths.

== Research ==
Fluralaner is being investigated to determine its ability to reduce the incidence of mosquito-borne diseases, as well as bed bugs.

A recent systematic review has been published on fluralaner efficacy and safety
