= Afoxolaner =

Chemical compound used as an insecticide

Clinical data
- Pronunciation: /eɪˌfɒksoʊˈlænər/ ay-FOK-soh-LAN-ər
- Trade names: Nexgard, Frontpro
- Other names: 4-[(5RS)-5-(5-Chloro-α,α,α-trifluoro-m-tolyl)-4,5-dihydro-5-(trifluoromethyl)-1,2-oxazol-3-yl]-N-[2-oxo-2-(2,2,2-trifluoroethylamino)ethyl]naphthalene-1-carboxamide
- AHFS/Drugs.com: International Drug Names
- License data: US DailyMed: Afoxolaner
- Routes of administration: By mouth
- ATCvet code: QP53BE01 (WHO)

Legal status
- Legal status: CA: ℞-only; US: ℞-only; EU: Rx-only; OTC (RU)

Pharmacokinetic data
- Bioavailability: 74% (T_{max} = 2–4 hours)
- Elimination half-life: 14 days
- Excretion: Bile duct (major route)

Identifiers
- IUPAC name: 4-{5-[3-chloro-5-(trifluoromethyl)phenyl]-5-(trifluoromethyl)-4''H''-1,2-oxazol-3-yl}-''N''-{2-oxo-2-[(2,2,2-trifluoroethyl)amino]ethyl}naphthalene-1-carboxamide
- CAS Number: 1093861-60-9
- PubChem CID: 25154249
- DrugBank: DB11369
- ChemSpider: 28651525
- UNII: 02L07H6D0U
- KEGG: D10361
- ChEMBL: ChEMBL2219412
- CompTox Dashboard (EPA): DTXSID50148921
- ECHA InfoCard: 100.267.822

Chemical and physical data
- Formula: C_{26}H_{17}ClF_{9}N_{3}O_{3}
- Molar mass: 625.88 g·mol^{−1}
- 3D model (JSmol): Interactive image
- Chirality: Racemic mixture
- SMILES: O=C(CNC(=O)c1ccc(C2=NOC(c3cc(Cl)cc(C(F)(F)F)c3)(C(F)(F)F)C2)c2ccccc12)NCC(F)(F)F
- InChI: InChI=1S/C26H17ClF9N3O3/c27-15-8-13(7-14(9-15)25(31,32)33)23(26(34,35)36)10-20(39-42-23)18-5-6-19(17-4-2-1-3-16(17)18)22(41)37-11-21(40)38-12-24(28,29)30/h1-9H,10-12H2,(H,37,41)(H,38,40); Key:OXDDDHGGRFRLEE-UHFFFAOYSA-N

Afoxolaner is an insecticide and acaricide that belongs to the isoxazoline chemical compound group. It is used to kill fleas and ticks in small animals.

== Mechanism ==
Afoxolaner is a GABA receptor antagonist, which stops chloride transmission in nerves and muscles resulting in paralysis with the paralysis resulting in death for the insect. Afoxolaner is more selective for GABA repectors in insects than mammals making it safe to give to an animal in amounts that are still lethal to insects.

Selectivity for insect over mammalian GABA-receptors has been demonstrated for other isoxazolines. The selectivity might be explained by the number of pharmacological differences that exist between GABA-gated chloride channels of insects and vertebrates.

== Use ==
Afoxolaner is given orally and is then rapidly distributed into the systemic circulation, when a tick or flea feeds on the blood of the host it ingests the afoxolaner and becomes paralysed. Thus fleas and ticks must first feed on the host for the drug to be effective. Afoxolaner has been given up to five times the therapeutic dose without causing intoxication.

== Legal status ==
The marketing authorization was granted by the European Medicines Agency in February 2014, for Nexgard, and in January 2015, for Nexgard Spectra.

== Brand names ==
Afoxolaner is the active ingredient of the veterinary medicinal products Nexgard, Frontpro, and Nexgard Spectra (in combination with milbemycin oxime). They are indicated for the treatment and prevention of flea infestations, and the treatment and control of tick infestations in dogs and puppies (8 weeks of age and older, weighing 4 pounds (~1.8 kilograms) of body weight or greater) for one month.
