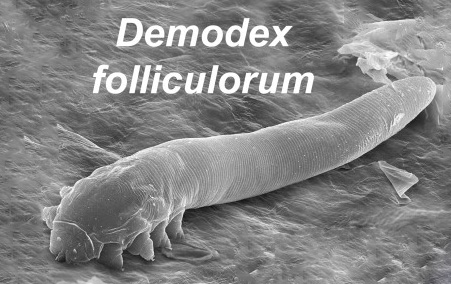

Scientific classification
- Kingdom: Animalia
- Phylum: Arthropoda
- Subphylum: Chelicerata
- Class: Arachnida
- Order: Trombidiformes
- Family: Demodecidae
- Genus: Demodex; Owen, 1843

Type species
- Acarus folliculorum Simon, 1842

Species
- Demodex aries; Demodex aurati; Demodex brevis; Demodex bovis; Demodex canis; Demodex caprae; Demodex caballi; Demodex cati; Demodex conicus; Demodex cornei; Demodex criceti; Demodex cyonis; Demodex equi; Demodex folliculorum; Demodex foveolator; Demodex gapperi; Demodex gatoi; Demodex huttereri; Demodex injai; Demodex leucogasteri; Demodex microti; Demodex ovis; Demodex phyloides; Demodex ponderosus; Demodex vibrissae; Demodex zalophi

= Demodex =

Genus of mites that live on mammals

Demodex /ˈdɛmədɛks/ is a genus of tiny mites that live in or near hair follicles of mammals. Around 65 species of Demodex are known. Two species live on humans: Demodex folliculorum and Demodex brevis, both frequently referred to as eyelash mites, alternatively face mites or skin mites.

Different species of animals host different species of Demodex. Demodex canis lives on the domestic dog. The presence of Demodex species on mammals is common and usually does not cause any symptoms. Demodex is derived from Greek δημός (dēmós) 'fat' and δήξ (dḗx) 'woodworm'.

== Notable species ==
=== D. folliculorum and D. brevis ===
Demodex folliculorum and D. brevis are typically found on humans. Jakob Henle was the first to observe Demodex mites in 1841. Demodex folliculorum was first described in 1842 by the German physician and dermatologist Gustav Simon, with the English biologist Richard Owen naming the genus Demodex the following year.

Demodex brevis was identified as separate in 1963 by L. Kh. Akbulatova. While D. folliculorum is found in hair follicles, D. brevis lives in sebaceous glands connected to hair follicles. Both species are primarily found in the face — near the nose, the eyelashes, and eyebrows — but also occur elsewhere on the body. Demodex folliculorum is occasionally found as a cause of folliculitis, although most people with D. folliculorum mites have no obvious ill effects.

The adult mites are 0.3–0.4 mm (3/256–1/64 in) long, with D. brevis slightly shorter than D. folliculorum. Each has a semitransparent, elongated body that consists of two fused parts. Eight short, segmented legs are attached to the first body segment. The body is covered with scales for anchoring itself in the hair follicle, and the mite has pin-like mouthparts for eating skin cells and oils that accumulate in the hair follicles. The mites can leave the follicles and slowly walk around on the skin, at a speed of 8–16 mm (3/8–5/8 in) per hour, especially at night, as they try to avoid light. The mites are transferred between hosts through contact with hair, eyebrows, and the sebaceous glands of the face.

Females of D. folliculorum are larger and rounder than males. Both male and female Demodex mites have a genital opening, and fertilization is internal. Mating takes place in the follicle opening, and eggs are laid inside the hair follicles or sebaceous glands. The six-legged larvae hatch after 3–4 days, and the larvae develop into adults in about 7 days. The total lifespan of a Demodex mite is several weeks.

==== Prevalence ====
Older people are much more likely to carry face mites; in a study of 370 volunteers in two hospitals and a university in 1986, about a third of children and young adults, half of adults, and two-thirds of elderly people were found to carry them. The lower rate in children may be because children produce less sebum, or simply have had less time to acquire the mite. A 2014 study of 29 people in North Carolina found that all of the adults (19) carried mites, and that 70% of those under 18 years of age carried mites. This study (using a DNA-detection method, more sensitive than traditional sampling and observation by microscope), along with several studies of cadavers, suggests that previous work might have underestimated the mites' prevalence. The small sample size and small geographical area involved prevent drawing broad conclusions from these data.

==== Research ====
Research about human infestation by Demodex mites is ongoing:

- Evidence of a correlation between Demodex infestation and acne vulgaris exists, suggesting it may play a role in promoting acne, including in immunocompetent infants displaying pityriasis and erythema toxicum neonatorum, or simply that Demodex mites thrive in the same oily conditions where acne bacteria thrive.
- Several preliminary studies suggest an association between mite infestation and rosacea.
- Demodex mites can cause blepharitis, which can be treated with solutions of tea tree oil.
- Demodex mites causing a reaction in healthy individuals depends on genealogy. Mites may evolve differently with different bloodlines.
- New studies suggest Demodex mites are involved in psoriasis, allergic rhinitis, and seborrheic dermatitis in immunosuppressed individuals.
- Demodex is treated with ivermectin: "Topical ivermectin is effective and well-tolerated for reducing the number and density of Demodex mites."

=== D. canis ===
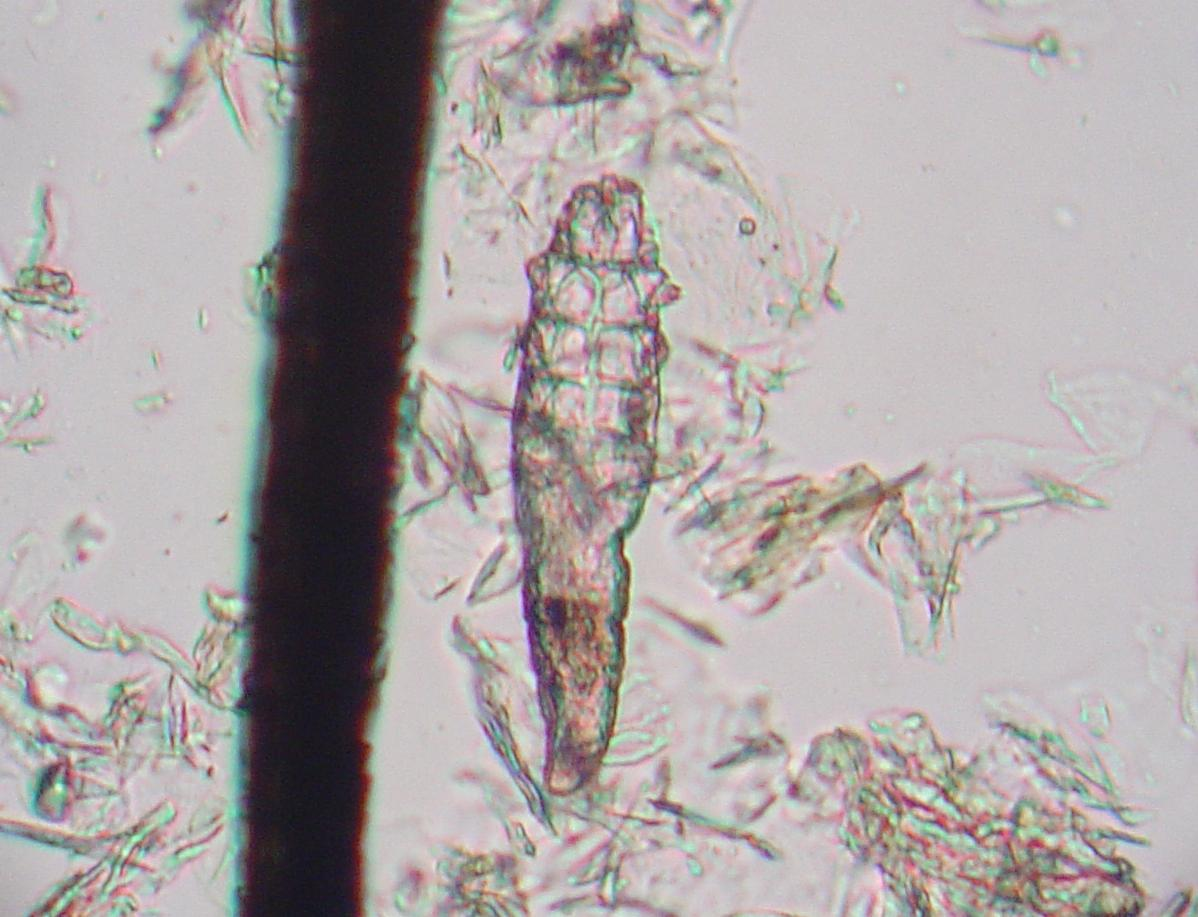
D. canis

The natural host of D. canis is the domestic dog. Demodex canis mites can survive on immunosuppressed human skin and human mites can infect immunosuppressed dogs, although reported cases are rare. Ivermectin is used for Demodex mites requiring up to four treatments to eradicate in humans; only one treatment is usually given to dogs to reduce mite count. Naturally, the D. canis mite has a commensal relationship with the dog, and under normal conditions does not produce any clinical signs or disease. The escalation of a commensal D. canis infestation into one requiring clinical attention usually involves complex immune factors.

Under normal health conditions, the mite can live within the dermis of the dog without causing any harm to the animal. However, whenever an immunosuppressive condition is present and the dog's immune system (which normally ensures that the mite population cannot escalate to an infestation that can damage the dermis of the host) is compromised, it allows the mites to proliferate. As they continue to infest the host, clinical signs begin to become apparent and demodicosis/demodectic mange/red mange is diagnosed.

Since D. canis is a part of the natural fauna on a canine's skin, the mite is not considered to be contagious. Many dogs receive an initial exposure from their mothers while nursing, during the first few days of life. The immune system of the healthy animal keeps the population of the mite in check, so subsequent exposure to dogs possessing clinical demodectic mange does not increase an animal's chance of developing demodicosis. Subsequent infestations after treatment can occur.

The species was first described by Franz Leydig in 1859.
