= Demodecidae =

Scientific classification
- Kingdom: Animalia
- Phylum: Arthropoda
- Subphylum: Chelicerata
- Class: Arachnida
- Order: Trombidiformes
- Superfamily: Cheyletoidea
- Family: Demodecidae; Nicolet, 1855

Genera
- Apodemodex; Demodex; Miridex; Ophthalmodex; Pterodex; Rhinodex; Soricidex; Stomatodex

Diversity
- 8 genera, c. 65 species

Family of mites

Demodecidae is a family of parasitic and commensal mites, living on various species of mammals. Each species of mite is usually only found on a single mammal species, whereas a mammal species can have several different species of demodecid mites living on it. Many species of mites are restricted to very limited areas of their body, e.g. the Meibomian glands, the ear canal, the tongue etc. The family was formerly named Demodicidae.
