= 1-Deoxy-11-oxopentalenate,NADH:oxygen oxidoreductase =

1-Deoxy-11-oxopentalenate,NADH:oxygen oxidoreductase may refer to the following enzymes:

- Pentalenolactone D synthase
- Neopentalenolactone D synthase
