= C7H14O4 =

The molecular formula C_{7}H_{14}O_{4} may refer to:

- Oleandrose
- Sarmentose
