= Pentalenic acid synthase =

Identifiers
- EC no.: 1.14.15.11

Databases
- IntEnz: IntEnz view
- BRENDA: BRENDA entry
- ExPASy: NiceZyme view
- KEGG: KEGG entry
- MetaCyc: metabolic pathway
- PRIAM: profile
- PDB structures: RCSB PDB PDBe PDBsum
Search
- PMC: articles
- PubMed: articles
- NCBI: proteins

Pentalenic acid synthase (EC 1.14.15.11, CYP105D7, sav7469 (gene)) is an enzyme with systematic name 1-deoxypentalenate,reduced ferredoxin:O2 oxidoreductase. This enzyme catalyses the following chemical reaction

1-deoxypentalenic acid
+ reduced
ferredoxin
O_{2}
H_{2}O
pentalenic acid
+ oxidised
ferredoxin

Pentalenic acid synthase from Streptomyces avermitilis is an oxidoreductase which uses molecular oxygen to insert a hydroxy group into 1-deoxypentalenic acid. It requires ferredoxin to transfer electrons to the cytochrome P450 active site.
