= Oleandrose =

Names
- IUPAC name 2,6-Dideoxy-3-O-methyl-L-arabino-hexose
- Systematic IUPAC name (3S,4S,5S)-4,5-Dihydroxy-3-methoxyhexanal
- Other names 2,6-Dideoxy-3-O-methyl-_{L}-arabinohexose

Identifiers
CAS Number	13089-77-5
3D model (JSmol)	Interactive image
ChEBI	CHEBI:10423
ChemSpider	4574484
KEGG	C08237
PubChem CID	5461155
UNII	C9TRD5E7IQ
- InChI: InChI=1S/C7H14O4/c1-5(9)7(10)6(11-2)3-4-8/h4-7,9-10H,3H2,1-2H3/t5-,6-,7-/m0/s1 Key: GOYBREOSJSERKM-ACZMJKKPSA-N
- SMILES: C[C@@H]([C@@H]([C@H](CC=O)OC)O)O

Properties
Chemical formula	C_{7}H_{14}O_{4}
Molar mass	162.185 g·mol^{−1}
- Except where otherwise noted, data are given for materials in their standard state (at 25 °C [77 °F], 100 kPa). Infobox references

Oleandrose is a type of carbohydrate with the chemical formula C_{7}H_{14}O_{4}. With a six-carbon chain, it is classified as a hexose. With two hydroxyl groups replaced with hydrogen atoms, it is a dideoxy sugar. The hydroxyl group at C3 is methylated.

== Occurrence ==
Oleandrdose is found in the leaves of Nerium oleander and may contribute to the toxicity of the plant. Oleandrose is also a component of several naturally occurring chemical compounds including the avermectins (emamectin, abamectins, ivermectin, and others), the macrolide antibiotic oleandomycin, and the cardiac glycoside oleandrin.

Laboratory syntheses of L-oleandrose and DL-oleandrose have been reported.

== See also ==
- Sarmentose, a diastereomeric dideoxy sugar
