= 1-Deoxy-11beta-hydroxypentalenate dehydrogenase =

Class of enzymes

1-deoxy-11beta-hydroxypentalenate dehydrogenase

Identifiers
- EC no.: 1.1.1.340

Databases
- IntEnz: IntEnz view
- BRENDA: BRENDA entry
- ExPASy: NiceZyme view
- KEGG: KEGG entry
- MetaCyc: metabolic pathway
- PRIAM: profile
- PDB structures: RCSB PDB PDBe PDBsum
Search
- PMC: articles
- PubMed: articles
- NCBI: proteins

1-deoxy-11beta-hydroxypentalenate dehydrogenase (EC 1.1.1.340, 1-deoxy-11beta-hydroxypentalenic acid dehydrogenase, ptlF (gene), penF (gene name)) is an enzyme with systematic name 1-deoxy-11beta-hydroxypentalenate:NAD^{+} oxidoreductase. This enzyme catalyses the following chemical reaction

1-deoxy-11β-hydroxypentalenic acid
+ NAD^{+}
H^{+}
H^{+}
1-deoxy-11-oxopentalenic acid
+ NADH

This enzyme from the bacterium Streptomyces avermitilis participates in pentalenolactone biosynthesis.
