= Pentalenene oxygenase =

Identifiers
- EC no.: 1.14.15.32

Databases
- IntEnz: IntEnz view
- BRENDA: BRENDA entry
- ExPASy: NiceZyme view
- KEGG: KEGG entry
- MetaCyc: metabolic pathway
- PRIAM: profile
- PDB structures: RCSB PDB PDBe PDBsum
Search
- PMC: articles
- PubMed: articles
- NCBI: proteins

Pentalenene oxygenase (EC 1.14.15.32, formerly EC 1.14.13.133, PtlI) is an enzyme with systematic name pentalenene,NADPH:oxygen 13-oxidoreductase. This enzyme is involved in the biosyntheses of pentalenolactone and other antibiotics. Additionally, it catalyses the following overall chemical reactions:

pentalenene
+ 4 reduced
ferredoxin
2 O_{2}
3 H_{2}O
pentalen-13-al
+ 4 oxidised
ferredoxin
pentalen-13-al
1-deoxypentalenic-acid

Pentalenene oxygenase from Streptomyces avermitilis is an oxidoreductase which uses molecular oxygen to insert a hydroxy group into 1-deoxypentalenic acid. It requires ferredoxin to transfer electrons to the cytochrome P450 active site.

Structure of pentalenolactone

The starting material is made as part of the biosynthetic pathway to pentalenolactone.
