= Macrolide 2'-kinase =

macrolide 2'-kinase

Identifiers
- EC no.: 2.7.1.136
- CAS no.: 116036-69-2

Databases
- IntEnz: IntEnz view
- BRENDA: BRENDA entry
- ExPASy: NiceZyme view
- KEGG: KEGG entry
- MetaCyc: metabolic pathway
- PRIAM: profile
- PDB structures: RCSB PDB PDBe PDBsum
- Gene Ontology: AmiGO / QuickGO
Search
- PMC: articles
- PubMed: articles
- NCBI: proteins

In enzymology, a macrolide 2'-kinase (EC 2.7.1.136) is an enzyme that catalyzes the chemical reaction

ATP + oleandomycin $\rightleftharpoons$ ADP + oleandomycin 2'-O-phosphate

Thus, the two substrates of this enzyme are ATP and oleandomycin, whereas its two products are ADP and oleandomycin 2'-O-phosphate.

This enzyme belongs to the family of transferases, specifically those transferring phosphorus-containing groups (phosphotransferases) with an alcohol group as acceptor. The systematic name of this enzyme class is ATP:macrolide 2'-O-phosphotransferase.
