= Abamectin =

Insecticide and anti-parasitic worm chemical

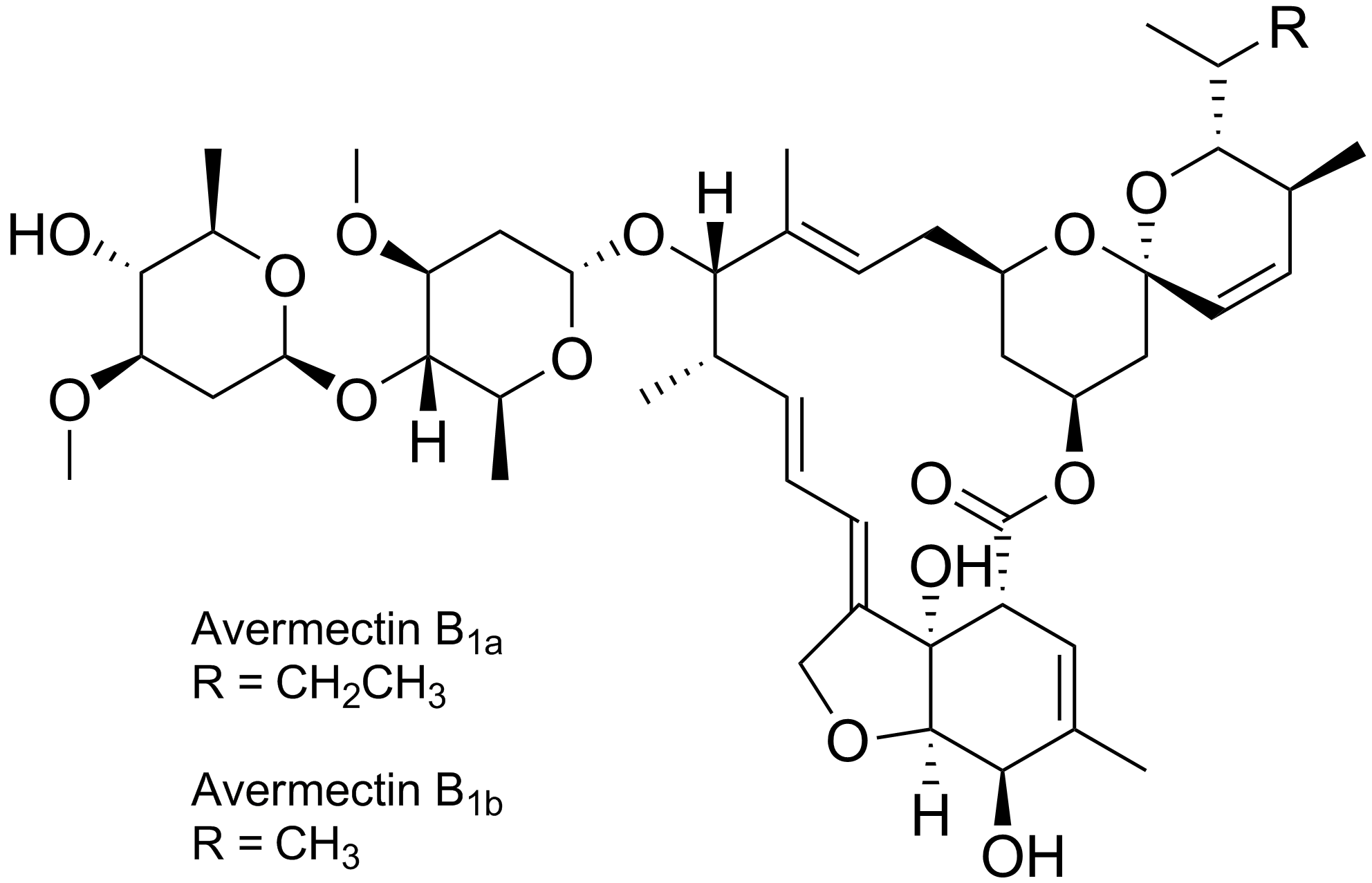

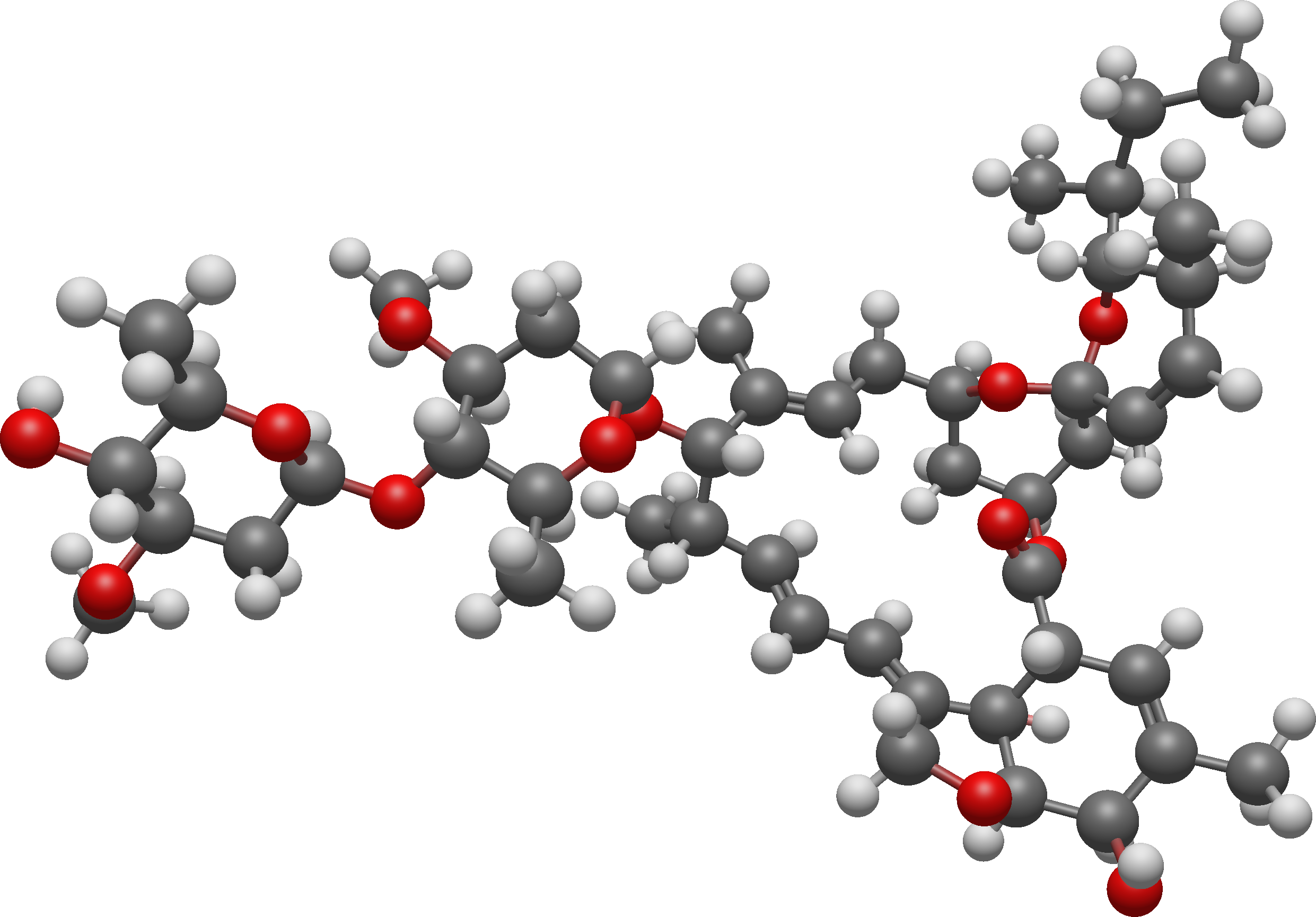

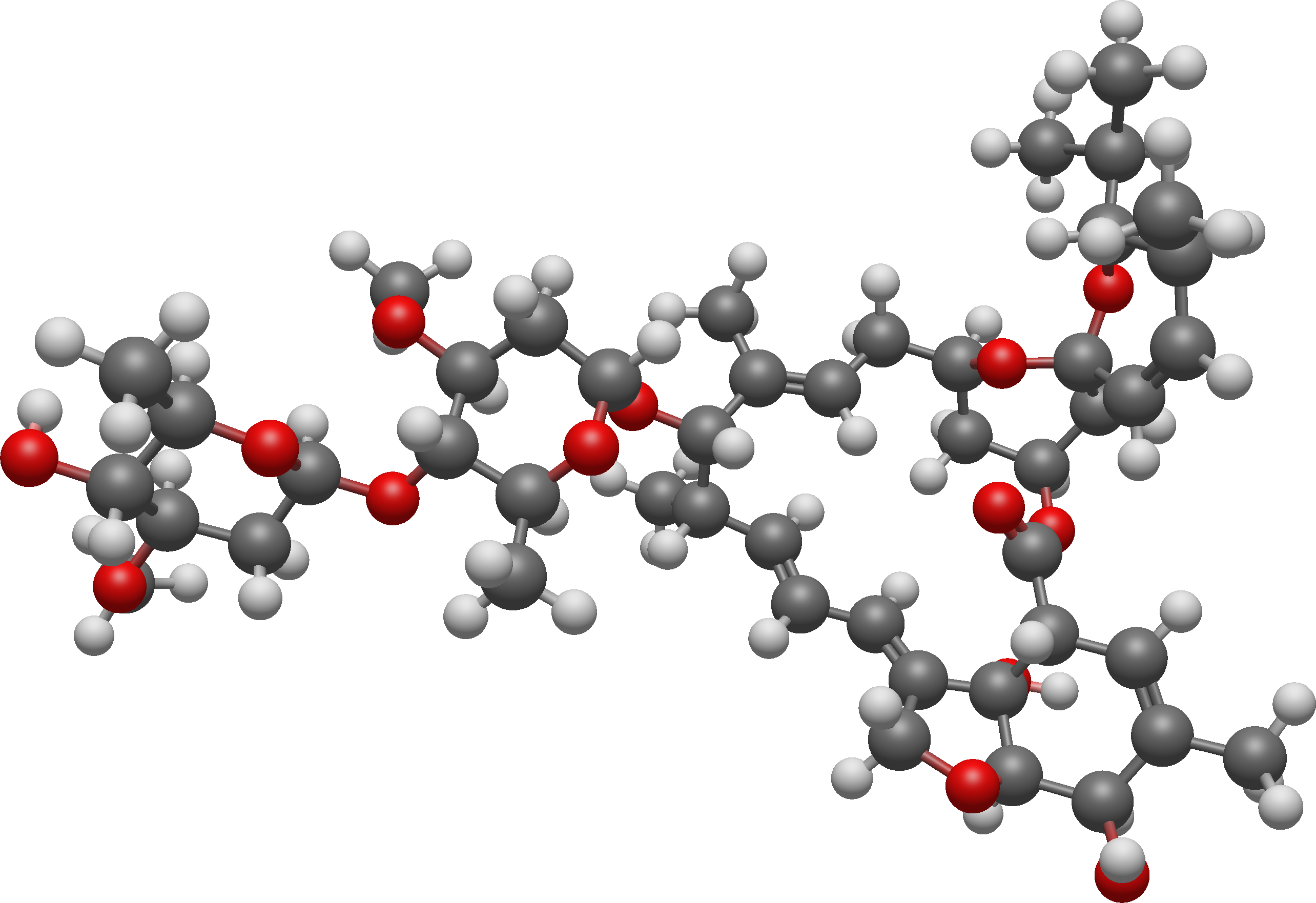

Clinical data
- Other names: Avermectin B_{1} (CAS name), MK-936
- ATCvet code: QP54AA02 (WHO)

Legal status
- Legal status: AU: S5 (Caution) / S6

Identifiers
- IUPAC name: Mixture of: (10E,14E,16E)-(1R,4S,5′S,6S,6′R,8R,12S,13S,20R,21R,24S)-6′-[(S)-sec-butyl]-21,24-dihydroxy-5′,11,13,22-tetramethyl-2-oxo-(3,7,19-trioxatetracyclo[15.6.1.14,8.020,24]pentacosa-10,14,16,22-tetraene)-6-spiro-2′-(5′,6′-dihydro-2′H-pyran)-12-yl 2,6-dideoxy-4-O-(2,6-dideoxy-3-O-methyl-α-L-arabino-hexopyranosyl)-3-O-methyl-α-L-arabino-hexopyranoside and (10E,14E,16E)-(1R,4S,5′S,6S,6′R,8R,12S,13S,20R,21R,24S)-21,22-dihydroxy-6′-isopropyl-5′,11,13,22-tetramethyl-2-oxo-(3,7,19-trioxatetracyclo[15.6.1.14,8.020,24]pentacosa-10,14,16,22-tetraene)-6-spiro-2′-(5′,6′-dihydro-2′H-pyran)-12-yl 2,6-dideoxy-4-O-(2,6-dideoxy-3-O-methyl-α-L-arabino-hexopyranosyl)-3-O-methyl-α-L-arabino-hexopyranoside
- CAS Number: 71751-41-2
- ChemSpider: 8095964
- UNII: 5U8924T11H
- KEGG: D02777
- ChEMBL: ChEMBL1630577
- CompTox Dashboard (EPA): DTXSID8023892
- ECHA InfoCard: 100.113.437

Chemical and physical data
- Formula: C_{48}H_{72}O_{14} (B_{1a}); C_{47}H_{70}O_{14} (B_{1b})
- 3D model (JSmol)
- SMILES: CC[C@H](C)[C@H]1O[C@@]2(C[C@@H]3C[C@@H](C\C=C(/C)\[C@@H](O[C@H]4C[C@H](OC)[C@@H](O[C@H]5C[C@H](OC)[C@@H](O)[C@H](C)O5)[C@H](C)O4)[C@@H](C)\C=C\C=C\6/CO[C@@H]7[C@H](O)C(=C[C@@H](C(=O)O3)[C@]67O)C)O2)C=C[C@@H]1C
- InChI: InChI=1S/C48H72O14.C47H70O14/c1-11-25(2)43-28(5)17-18-47(62-43)23-34-20-33(61-47)16-15-27(4)42(26(3)13-12-14-32-24-55-45-40(49)29(6)19-35(46(51)58-34)48(32,45)52)59-39-22-37(54-10)44(31(8)57-39)60-38-21-36(53-9)41(50)30(7)56-38;1-24(2)41-27(5)16-17-46(61-41)22-33-19-32(60-46)15-14-26(4)42(25(3)12-11-13-31-23-54-44-39(48)28(6)18-34(45(50)57-33)47(31,44)51)58-38-21-36(53-10)43(30(8)56-38)59-37-20-35(52-9)40(49)29(7)55-37/h12-15,17-19,25-26,28,30-31,33-45,49-50,52H,11,16,20-24H2,1-10H3;11-14,16-18,24-25,27,29-30,32-44,48-49,51H,15,19-23H2,1-10H3/b13-12+,27-15+,32-14+;12-11+,26-14+,31-13+/t25-,26-,28-,30-,31-,33+,34-,35-,36-,37-,38-,39-,40+,41-,42-,43+,44-,45+,47+,48+;25-,27-,29-,30-,32+,33-,34-,35-,36-,37-,38-,39+,40-,41+,42-,43-,44+,46+,47+/m00/s1; Key:IBSREHMXUMOFBB-JFUDTMANSA-N

Abamectin (also called avermectin B_{1}) is a widely used insecticide and anthelmintic. Abamectin, is a member of the avermectin family and is a natural fermentation product of soil dwelling actinomycete Streptomyces avermitilis. Abamectin differs from ivermectin, the popular member of the avermectin family, by a double bond between carbons 22 and 23. Fermentation of Streptomyces avermitilis yields eight closely related avermectin homologs, with the B_{1a} and B_{1b} forms comprising the majority of the fermentation. The non-proprietary name, abamectin, refers to a mixture of B_{1a} (~80%) and B_{1b} (~20%). Out of all the avermectins, abamectin is the only one that is used both in agriculture and pharmaceuticals.

== Mode of action ==
Avermectins bind to the glutamate-gated chloride channels that are found in invertebrate nerve and muscle cells. They cause hyperpolarization of these cells resulting in paralysis and death. Mammals only possess glutamate-gated chloride channels in the brain and spinal cord and as the avermectins have a low affinity for other mammalian ligand-gated channels and do not usually cross the blood–brain barrier, they are very safe for mammals.

== History ==
Avermectins were discovered in 1967 in fermentation broths of an actinomycete culture received from the Kitasato Institute in Japan, following an intensive search designed to find natural products with anthelmintic activity. It was not until 1985 ivermectin was first used to treat infections with Onchocerca volvulus (onchocerciasis or river blindness) in humans by the United Nations. The discoverers of avermectin, William C. Campbell and Satoshi Ōmura, shared the 2015 Nobel Prize in Physiology or Medicine.

== Activity ==
Abamectin is an insecticide as well as an acaricide (miticide) and a nematicide. It is also used to control fire ants. Abamectin is provided orally to horses for deworming them.

== Use ==
Abamectin is also used as a veterinary antihelmintic. Resistance to abamectin-based antihelmintics, although a growing problem, is not as common as to other classes of veterinary antihelmintics. The benzoate salt emamectin benzoate is also used as an insecticide. Avermectins have been used to treat various ailments caused by parasites in both humans and animals. Avermectins including abamectin were studied for use as anti alcohol therapies. Recently, ivermectin is being studied for use as an anti inflammatory agent.

== Environmental fate ==
Abamectin degrades rapidly when exposed to light (photodegradation) on plant surfaces, in soil, dung and water. Half life of Avermectins (including abamectin) varies between 0.5 and 23 days depending on the rate and substrate (water, soil, faeces or plant). Avermectin B_{1a} applied at 0.02–0.03 lb ai/acre (50% higher than recommended rates) resulted in very low residue.

== Non targets ==
Abamectin is highly toxic to bees either if they consume or come in direct contact. However, plant parts exposed to abamectin spraying did not cause toxicity to bees 24 hours after treatment. The reason for lower toxicity in foliage is due to a half life <24 hours in plant surfaces.

== Trade names ==
Trade names include Abba, Abathor, Affirm, Agri-Mek, Avid, Dynamec, Epi-Mek, Genesis Horse Wormer, Reaper, Termictine 5%, Vertimec, CAM-MEK 1.8% EC (cam for agrochemicals), Zephyr and Cure 1.8 EC. Abamet from Rainbow
