= Emamectin =

Names
- Other names 4″-Deoxy-4″-epi-methylamino-avermectin B1; Epi-methylamino-4″-deoxy-avermectin; MK 243; EMA; GWN 1972

Identifiers
CAS Number	119791-41-2; 155569-91-8 (Benzoate)
3D model (JSmol)	Interactive image
Beilstein Reference	8671728
ChEBI	CHEBI:39231
ChEMBL	ChEMBL1907098
ChemSpider	17215886
ECHA InfoCard	100.217.470
EC Number	605-015-1
PubChem CID	11549937
RTECS number	CL1203005
UNII	8C43B81H4W; HVM3G4A01W (Benzoate)
CompTox Dashboard (EPA)	DTXSID3035052
- InChI: InChI=1S/C49H75NO13/c1-12-26(2)44-29(5)18-19-48(63-44)24-35-21-34(62-48)17-16-28(4)43(27(3)14-13-15-33-25-56-46-42(51)30(6)20-36(47(52)59-35)49(33,46)53)60-40-23-38(55-11)45(32(8)58-40)61-39-22-37(54-10)41(50-9)31(7)57-39/h13-16,18-20,26-27,29,31-32,34-46,50-51,53H,12,17,21-25H2,1-11H3/b14-13+,28-16+,33-15+/t26-,27-,29-,31-,32-,34+,35-,36-,37-,38-,39-,40-,41-,42+,43-,44+,45-,46+,48+,49+/m0/s1 Key: CXEGAUYXQAKHKJ-NSBHKLITSA-N
- SMILES: C/C([C@](O[C@H]1C[C@H](OC)[C@](O[C@@H]2O[C@H](C)[C@@H](NC)[C@H](OC)C2)([H])[C@H](C)O1)([H])[C@@H](C)/C=C/C=C(CO3)/[C@@]([C@@]3([H])[C@H](O)C(C)=C4)(O)[C@@H]4C(O5)=O)=C\C[C@@H]6C[C@H]5C[C@]7(C=C[C@H](C)[C@]([C@@H](C)CC)([H])O7)O6

Properties
Chemical formula	C_{49}H_{75}NO_{13}
Molar mass	886.133 g·mol^{−1}
Appearance	White or faintly yellow powder
Melting point	141 to 146 °C (286 to 295 °F; 414 to 419 K)
Solubility in water	30-50 ppm (pH 7)

Pharmacology
ATCvet code	QP54AA06 (WHO)
Legal status	CA: ℞-only

Hazards
- GHS labelling
Pictograms	(GHS05: Corrosive) (GHS06: Toxic) (GHS07: Exclamation mark) (GHS08: Health hazard) (GHS09: Environmental hazard)
Signal word	Danger
Hazard statements	H301, H311, H318, H331, H370, H372, H410
Precautionary statements	P260, P264, P270, P271, P273, P280, P301+P310, P302+P352, P304+P340, P305+P351+P338, P307+P311, P310, P311, P312, P314, P321, P322, P330, P337+P313, P361, P363, P391, P403+P233, P405, P501
NFPA 704 (fire diamond)	2 2 0
- Except where otherwise noted, data are given for materials in their standard state (at 25 °C [77 °F], 100 kPa). verify (what is ?) Infobox references

Emamectin is the 4″-deoxy-4″-methylamino derivative of abamectin, a 16-membered macrocyclic lactone produced by the fermentation of the soil actinomycete Streptomyces avermitilis. It is generally prepared as the salt with benzoic acid, emamectin benzoate, which is a white or faintly yellow powder. Emamectin is widely used in the US and Canada as an insecticide because of its chloride channel activation properties.

== History ==
Emamectin, produced by the bacterium Streptomyces avermitilis, belongs to the avermectin family of compounds all of which exhibit toxicity for nematodes, arthropods, and several other pests. The benzoate salt of emamectin in particular has found widespread use as an insecticide and is approved by the EPA for use in prevention of emerald ash borer in ash trees. Emamectin is derived from avermectin B1, also known as abamectin, a mixture of the natural avermectin B1a and B1b. Emamectin has also shown promising applications in the eradication of fish lice and in fish farming.

Emamectin was invented by Regina D. Leseota, Pradip K. Mookerjee, John Misselbrook, and Robert F. Peterson Jr. and patented on September 25, 2001, approved August 22, 2002. It was developed as a pesticide by Merck & Co. as investigative compound MK-0244

== Preparation ==
Emamectin is derived from abamectin by replacement of an epi-amino-methyl (NHCH_{3}) group by a hydroxyl (-OH) group at the 4″-position. Emamectin, like abamectin, is a mixture of two homologue compounds termed B1a and B1b which differ on the C-25 side-chain by one methylene (CH2) group. B1a contains a sec-butyl group while B1b has an isopropyl group. Emamectin is a mixture, typically consisting of 10% B1b and 90% B1a.

Avermectin biosynthesis is classified into three stages: the formation of the polyketide-derived initial aglycone, modification of the initial aglycone to produce avermectin aglycones, and glycosylation of avermectin aglycones to generate avermectins.

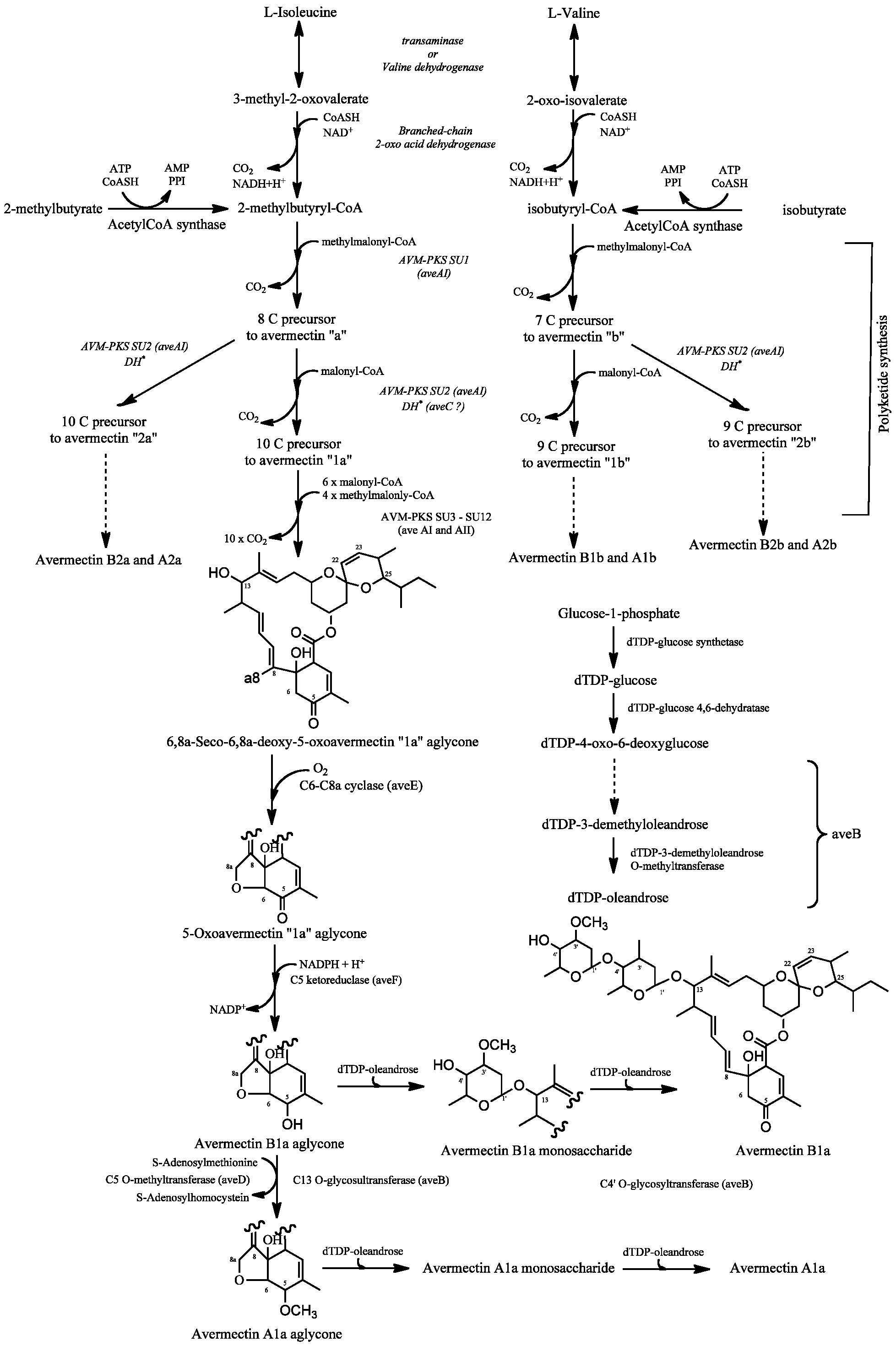

== Uses ==
Emamectin is widely used in controlling lepidopterous pests (order of insects that as larvae are caterpillars and as adults have four broad wings including butterflies, moths, and skippers) in agricultural products in the US, Japan, Canada, and recently Taiwan. The low-application rate of the active ingredient needed (about 15 g/ha (6 g/acre)) and broad-spectrum applicability as an insecticide has gained emamectin significant popularity among farmers.

Emamectin has been shown to possess a greater ability to reduce the colonization success of engraver beetles and associated wood borers in loblolly pines (Pinus taeda). A 2006 study regarding bolt-injections of four types of pesticides found emamectin to be the greatest reducer against these species with respect to the amount of larval feeding, length, and number of egg galleries. Formation of long vertical lesions in the phloem and xylem surrounding emamectin injection points were found indicating some level of tree-toxicity to the emamectin.

A water-soluble preparation of emamectin in polysorbate, acetone, and methanol was shown to prevent the wilting of Japanese black pines inoculated with pine-wood nematodes (Bursaphelenchus xylophilus). Previous treatment of B. xylophilus infections involved eradicating the local population of Japanese pine sawyers associated with the spread of the nematode.

Emamectin has also been successfully employed by fish farmers in the control of sea lice in Atlantic salmon. The United Kingdom, Chile, Ireland, Iceland, Finland, the Faroe Islands, Spain, and Norway are currently registered to use emamectin in their fish feed. Removal of the afflicting sea louse represents an increase in the integrity of their salmonid product due to the subsequent reduction of bacterial and viral pathogens possibly carried by the sea lice. Emamectin has shown efficacy against all life-cycle stages of Lepeophtheirus salmonis (salmon louse) and Caligus elongatus (sea louse), preventing maturation to the reproductive stage.

A related dihydroxy avermectin B1 compound, ivermectin, is utilized orally in humans as an acaricide and insecticide for the treatment of strongyloidiasis and onchocerciasis. Veterinarians also employ ivermectin in the treatment of heartworms in dogs and other infestations.

== Structure and properties ==
Emamectin, like other avermectins, is a hydrophobic 16-membered macrocyclic lactone. Emamectin differs from avermectins B1a and B1b by the presence of a hydroxyl group at the 4″-epimethylamino group rather than the 4″-position. Avermectins are pentacyclic polyketide-derived compounds linked to a disaccharide of the methylated deoxysugar oleandrose.

The determination of the active-site for avermectins is difficult due to poor solubility and lipophilicity of these compounds.

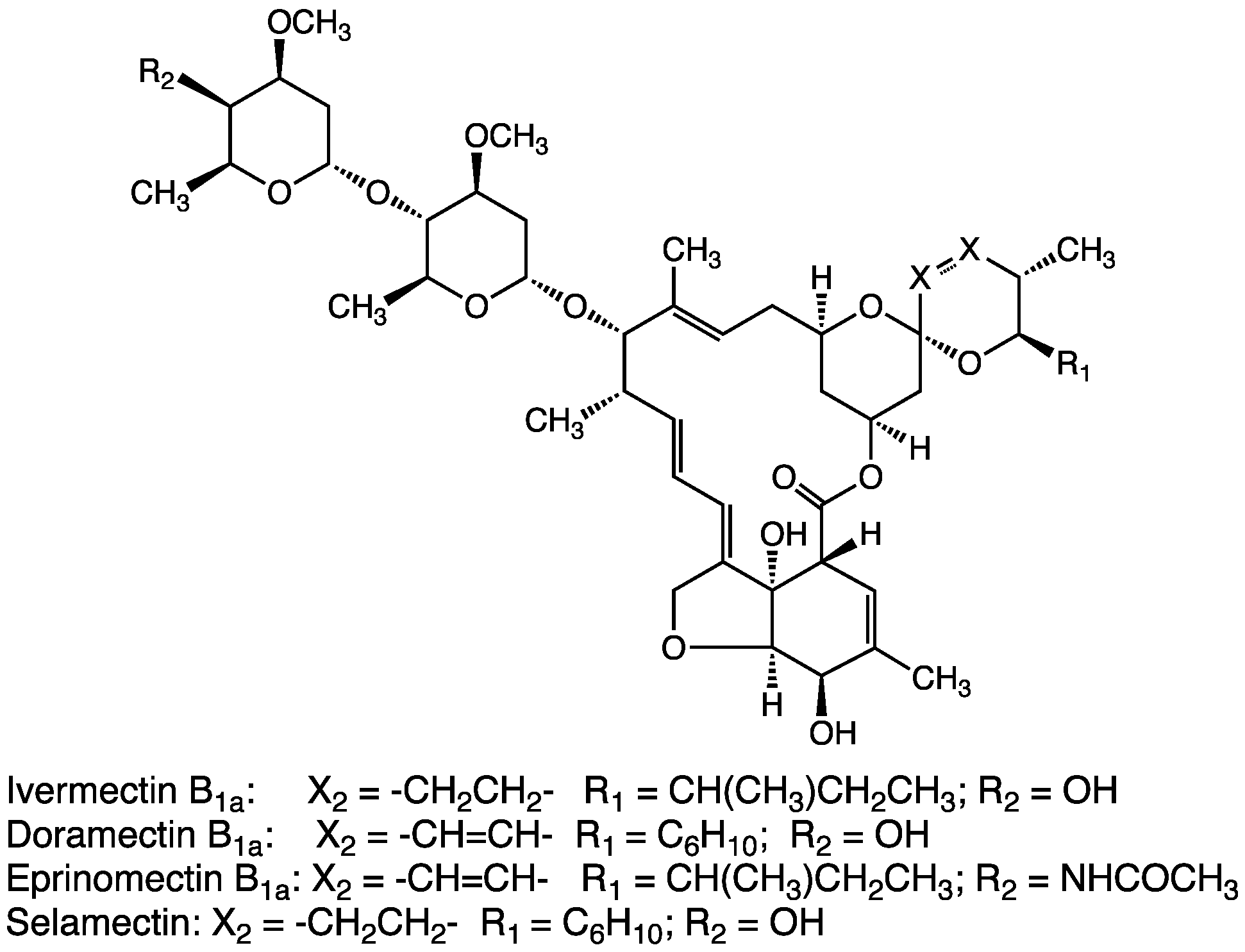

== Toxicology and metabolism ==
Emamectin works as a chloride channel activator by binding gamma aminobutyric acid (GABA) receptor and glutamate-gated chloride channels disrupting nerve signals within arthropods. The compound stimulates the release of GABA from the synapses between nerve cells and while additionally increasing GABA's affinity for its receptor on the post-junction membrane of muscle cells in insects and arthropods. The stronger binding of GABA increases the cells permeability to chloride ions within the cell due to the hypotonic concentration gradient. Neurotransmission is thereby reduced by subsequent hyperpolarisation and the elimination of signal transduction.
