= Avermectin =

Drugs to treat parasitic worms and insect pests

Skeletal structure of the 8 different natural avermectins

The avermectins are a group of 16-membered macrocyclic lactone derivatives with potent anthelmintic and insecticidal properties. These naturally occurring compounds are generated as fermentation products by Streptomyces avermitilis, a soil actinomycete. Eight different avermectins were isolated in four pairs of homologue compounds (A1, A2, B1, B2), with a major (a-component) and minor (b-component) component usually in ratios of 80:20 to 90:10. Avermectin B1, a mixture of B1a and B1b, is the drug and pesticide abamectin. Other anthelmintics derived from the avermectins include ivermectin, selamectin, doramectin, eprinomectin.

Half of the 2015 Nobel Prize in Physiology or Medicine was awarded to William C. Campbell and Satoshi Ōmura for discovering avermectin, "the derivatives of which have radically lowered the incidence of river blindness and lymphatic filariasis, as well as showing efficacy against an expanding number of other parasitic diseases."

== History ==
In 1978, an actinomycete was isolated at the Kitasato Institute from a soil sample collected at Kawana, Ito City, Shizuoka Prefecture, Japan. Later that year, the isolated actinomycete was sent to Merck Sharp and Dohme Research Laboratories for testing. Various carefully controlled broths were fermented using the isolated actinomycete. Early tests indicated that some of the whole, fermented broths were active against Nematospiroides dubius in mice over at least an eight-fold range without notable toxicity. Subsequent to this, the anthelmintic activity was isolated and identified as a family of closely related compounds. The compounds were finally characterized and the novel species that produced them were described by a team at Merck in 1978, and named Streptomyces avermitilis (with the adjective probably intended to mean that it kills worms).

In 2002, Yoko Takahashi and others at the Kitasato Institute for Life Sciences, Kitasato University, and at the Kitasato Institute, proposed that Streptomyces avermitilis be renamed Streptomyces avermectinius.

== Dosing ==
A commonly used therapy in recent times has been based on oral, parenteral, topical, or spot topical (as in veterinary flea repellant "drops") administration of avermectins. They show activity against a broad range of nematodes and arthropod parasites of domestic animals at dose rates of 300 μg/kg or less (200 μg/kg ivermectin appearing to be the common interspecies standard, from humans to horses to house pets, unless otherwise indicated). Unlike the macrolide or polyene antibiotics, they lack significant antibacterial or antifungal activities.

== Mechanism of action ==
The avermectins block the transmission of electrical activity in invertebrate nerve and muscle cells mostly by enhancing the effects of glutamate at the glutamate-gated chloride channel that is specific to protostome invertebrates, with minor effects on gamma-aminobutyric acid receptors. This causes an influx of chloride ions into the cells, leading to hyperpolarisation and subsequent paralysis of invertebrate neuromuscular systems; comparable doses are not toxic for mammals because they do not possess protostome-specific glutamate-gated chloride channels. Together with the milbemycins, avermectins belong to IRAC group 6.

== Toxicity and side effects ==
Resistance to avermectins has been reported, which suggests moderation in use. Resistance in Caenorhabditis elegans has been observed by the most obvious route – variation of the glutamate-gated chloride channel. Research on ivermectin, piperazine, and dichlorvos in combinations also shows potential for toxicity. Avermectin has been reported to block LPS-induced secretion of tumor necrosis factor, nitric oxide, prostaglandin E2, and increase of intracellular concentration of Ca^{2+}. Adverse effects are usually transient; severe effects are rare and probably occur only with substantial overdose, but include coma, hypotension, and respiratory failure, which can lead to death. No specific therapy exists, but symptomatic management usually leads to a favorable prognosis.

== Avermectin biosynthesis ==
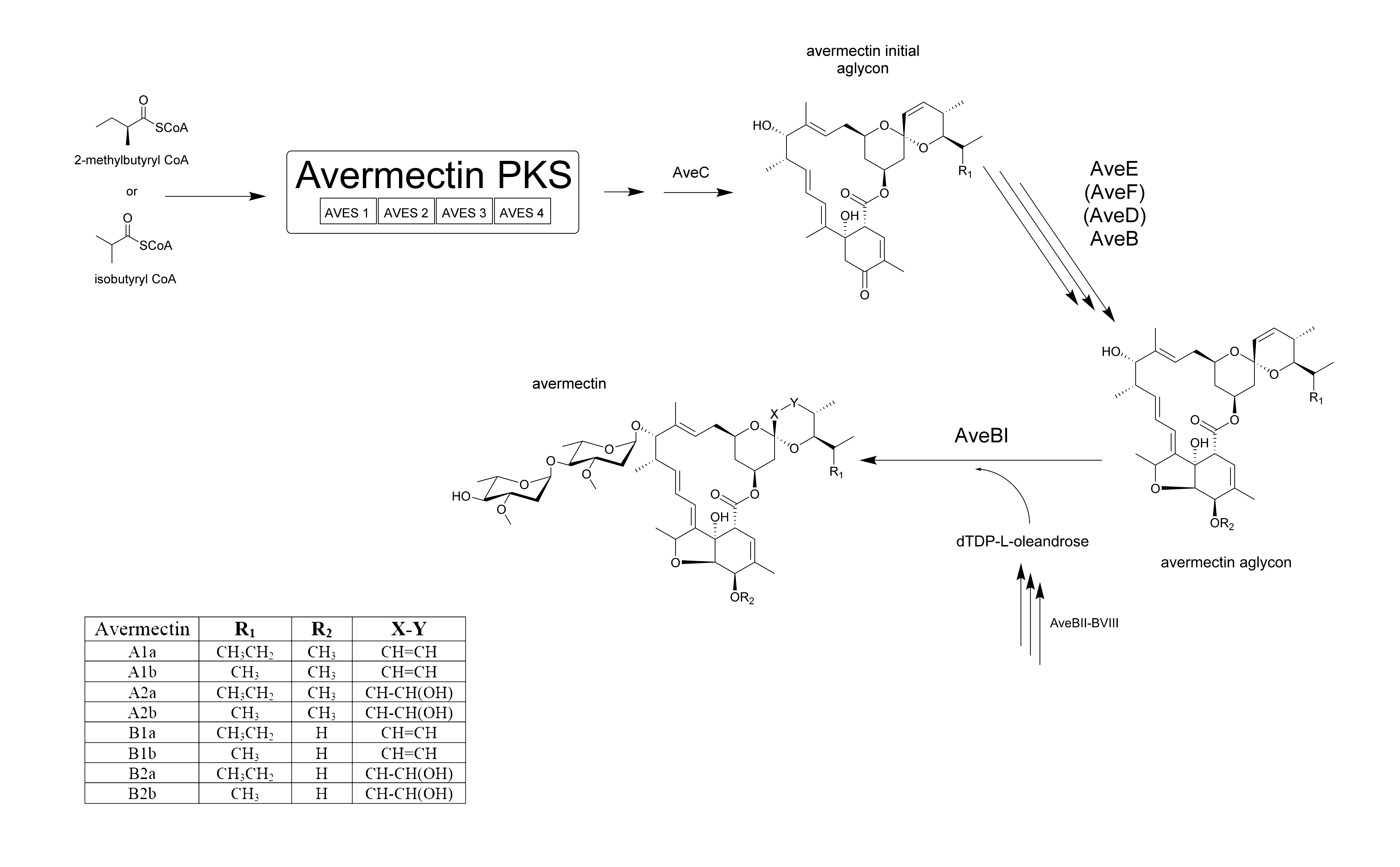
Diagram showing the schematic synthesis of avermectins

The gene cluster for biosynthesis of avermectin from S. avermitilis has been sequenced. The avermectin biosynthesis gene cluster encodes enzymes responsible for four steps of avermectin production: 1) production of the avermectin aglycon by polyketide synthases, 2) modification of the aglycon, 3) synthesis of modified sugars, and 4) glycosylation of the modified avermectin aglycon. This gene cluster can produce eight avermectins which have minor structural differences.

Organization of the avermectin polyketide synthase

The avermectin initial aglycon is synthesized by the polyketide synthase activity of four proteins (AVES 1, AVES 2, AVES 3, and AVES 4). The activity of this enzyme complex is similar to type I polyketide synthases. Either 2-methylbutyryl CoA or isobutyryl CoA can be used as starting units and are extended by seven acetate units and five propionate units to produce avermectin "a" series or "b" series, respectively. The initial aglycon is subsequently released from the thioesterase domain of AVES 4 by formation of an intramolecular cyclic ester.

The avermectin initial aglycon is further modified by other enzymes in the avermectin biosynthetic gene cluster. AveE has cytochrome P450 monooxygenase activity and facilitates the furan ring formation between C6 and C8. AveF has NAD(P)H-dependent ketoreductase activity which reduces the C5 keto group to a hydroxyl. AveC influences the dehydratase activity in module two (affecting C22-C23), although the mechanism by which it does this is not clear. AveD has SAM-dependent C5 O-methyltransferase activity. Whether AveC or AveD acts on the aglycon determines whether the resulting avermectin aglycon will produce avermectin, series "A" or "B" and series 1 or 2 (see synthesis schematic diagram table), respectively.

Nine open reading frames (orf1 and aveBI-BVIII) are downstream of aveA4, which are known involved with glycosylation and sugar synthesis. AveBII-BVIII are responsible for synthesis of dTDP-L-oleandrose and AveBI is responsible for glycosylation of the avermectin aglycon with the dTDP-sugar. The sequence of orf1 suggests that its product will have reductase activity, but this functionality does not appear to be necessary for avermectin synthesis.

== Other uses ==
Abamectin is the active ingredient in some commercial ant bait traps. Ivermectin, formulated from Avermectin, has a wide variety of uses in human beings. According to a paper (Ivermectin: "Wonder Drug" from Japan: the human use perspective) written by the drugs co-creator Satoshi Ōmura and Andy Crump for The Japan Academy, Ivermectin has improved the lives of billions of people worldwide and not solely for uses as an anti parasitic.

== See also ==
- Milbemycins are a chemically closely related group of parasiticides.
- Avermectin/ivermectin glycorandomization
