= Oleandrin =

Plant chemical

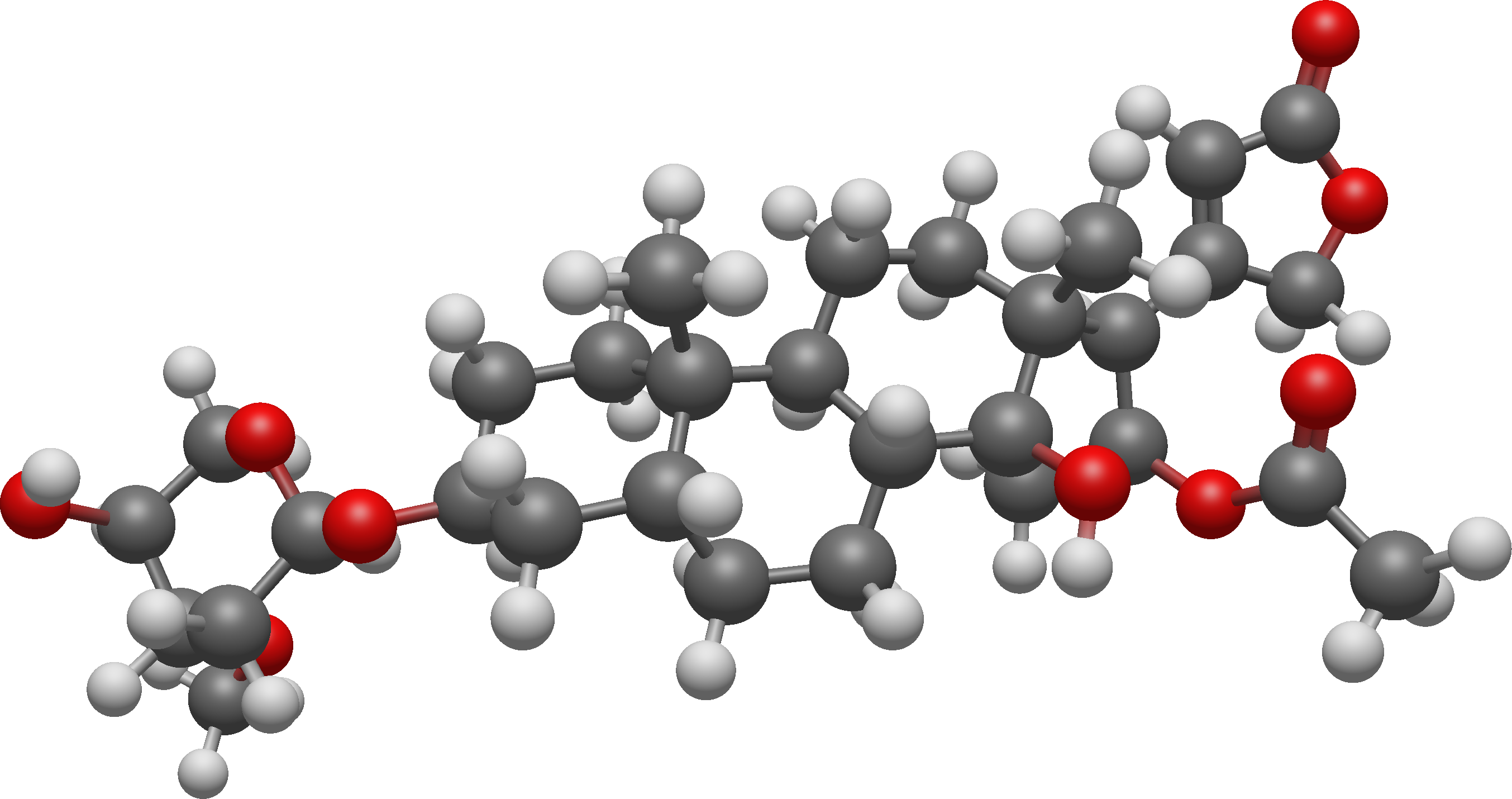

Names
- IUPAC name 16β-(Acetyloxy)-3β-(2,6-dideoxy-3-O-methyl-α-L-arabino-hexopyranosyloxy)-14-hydroxy-5β-card-20(22)-enolide
- Systematic IUPAC name (1R,2S,3aS,3bR,5aR,7S,9aS,9bS,11aR)-3a-Hydroxy-7-{[(2R,4S,5S,6S)-5-hydroxy-4-methoxy-6-methyloxan-2-yl]oxy}-9a,11a-dimethyl-1-(5-oxo-2,5-dihydrofuran-3-yl)hexadecahydro-1H-cyclopenta[a]phenanthren-2-yl acetate

Identifiers
| CAS Number | 465-16-7 |
| 3D model (JSmol) | Interactive image |
| ChEMBL | ChEMBL109718 |
| ChemSpider | 9716290 |
| ECHA InfoCard | 100.006.693 |
| PubChem CID | 11541511 |
| UNII | II95UDU7I4 |
- InChI: InChI=1S/C32H48O9/c1-17-29(35)24(37-5)14-27(39-17)41-21-8-10-30(3)20(13-21)6-7-23-22(30)9-11-31(4)28(19-12-26(34)38-16-19)25(40-18(2)33)15-32(23,31)36/h12,17,20-25,27-29,35-36H,6-11,13-16H2,1-5H3/t17-,20+,21-,22-,23+,24-,25-,27-,28-,29-,30-,31+,32-/m0/s1 Key: JLPDBLFIVFSOCC-XYXFTTADSA-N; InChI=1/C32H48O9/c1-17-29(35)24(37-5)14-27(39-17)41-21-8-10-30(3)20(13-21)6-7-23-22(30)9-11-31(4)28(19-12-26(34)38-16-19)25(40-18(2)33)15-32(23,31)36/h12,17,20-25,27-29,35-36H,6-11,13-16H2,1-5H3/t17-,20+,21-,22-,23+,24-,25-,27-,28-,29-,30-,31+,32-/m0/s1 Key: JLPDBLFIVFSOCC-XYXFTTADBR
- SMILES: O=C\1OC/C(=C/1)[C@H]2[C@@H](OC(=O)C)C[C@@]6(O)[C@]2(C)CC[C@H]4[C@H]6CC[C@@H]5C[C@@H](O[C@@H]3O[C@H]([C@H](O)[C@@H](OC)C3)C)CC[C@]45C

Properties
| Chemical formula | C_{32}H_{48}O_{9} |
| Molar mass | 576.72 g/mol |
| Appearance | Oleandrin forms colourless, odourless, acicular crystals that are very bitter |
| Density | 1.261 g/ml |
| Melting point | 250.0 °C (482.0 °F; 523.1 K) |

Hazards
- Occupational safety and health (OHS/OSH)
| Main hazards | Acute Toxicity (Oral, inhalation) |
- GHS labelling
| Pictograms | (GHS06: Toxic) (GHS08: Health hazard) |
| Signal word | Danger |
| Hazard statements | H300, H330, H373 |
| Precautionary statements | P260, P264, P270, P271, P284, P301+P310, P304+P340, P310, P320, P330, P403+P233, P405, P501 |
| NFPA 704 (fire diamond) | 4 0 0 |
- Lethal dose or concentration (LD, LC)
| LD_{50} (median dose) | 0.248 mg/kg (Cat, Intravenous) |
| Safety data sheet (SDS) | Safety Data Sheet |
- Except where otherwise noted, data are given for materials in their standard state (at 25 °C [77 °F], 100 kPa). verify (what is ?) Infobox references

Oleandrin is a cardiac glycoside found in the poisonous plant oleander (Nerium oleander L.). As a main phytochemical of oleander, oleandrin is associated with the toxicity of oleander sap, and has similar properties to digoxin. Oleandrin and other oleander chemicals are potentially toxic to the heart, liver, and kidneys.

Although oleander has been used in traditional medicine and as a dietary supplement, there is no clinical evidence that oleander and its constituents, including oleandrin, are safe or effective for any therapeutic purpose. Oleandrin is not approved by regulatory agencies as a prescription drug.

== Structure and reactivity ==
The structure of oleandrin contains a central steroid nucleus with an unsaturated lactone ring structure on C17 and a dideoxy arabinose group on C3. In addition, the steroid ring has a substitute of an acetyloxy group on C16. The sugar forming the glycoside is L-oleandrose.

Oleandrin resembles very much other glycosides like ouabain and digoxin but has less effect than digoxin. It is however, just like its derivate oleandrigenin, a more potent glycoside than ouabain.

== Synthesis ==
Oleandrin and its derivate oleandrigenin are formed in the N. oleander plant. The oleandrin itself can be won out of the leaves and other parts of the plant but can also be produced in the lab by using cell cultures. Here, the oleandrin synthesis (along with other metabolites) can be stimulated in untransformed plant cell cultures with supplementation of phytohormone. However, this is not enough to produce large quantities because of early cell death. Transgenic cultures of Agrobacteria are able to synthesize great quantities of oleandrin and other metabolites of the oleander plants, fit for pharmaceutical purposes.

=== Related substances ===
Oleandrin is, apart from its pure form, also closely related to structural similar glycosides and alkaloids, which all have more or less the same characteristics as oleandrin:

- Oleandrigenin is a deglycosylated metabolite of oleandrin. It has however a more mild effect.
- Conessine
- Neritaloside
- Odorside

== Metabolism ==
Although oleandrigenin is not formed in human plasma, it was found in the volunteers injected with oleandrin, suggesting that it is formed in other human tissues. Because of its lipophilic properties, oleandrin can be easily absorbed in the gastrointestinal tract after oral dosing. The clearance is slow. The plasma concentration obtains its maximum at twenty minutes after oral intake (half-life of about 2 hours, but half-life after IV administration is half an hour).

It is excreted mostly in feces, but also in urine. Because the main route of excretion is through biliary excretion into the feces, it is mainly the liver that is exposed to oleandrin. As excretion in urine is only a smaller route, the kidneys are less exposed. There is also accumulation in the heart, which explains its potential for cardiac toxicity.

== Mechanism of action ==
Because of its properties as a cardiac glycoside, oleandrin interferes in some essential processes within the cell, the most important of these being the inhibition of the Na-K ATPase. This protein enables the cell to exchange the cations Na+ and K+ between the intercellular and extracellular spaces by which, for instance, electric signaling is made possible in nerve cells. Oleandrin binds to specific amino acids in the protein, causing it to lose its function.

Apart from being a potent toxic compound, there are no results on oleandrin from human clinical research that support its use as a treatment for cancer or any disease.

== Toxicity ==
Due to its considerable toxicity, use of oleander or its constituents, such as oleandrin, is regarded as unsafe and potentially lethal. Use of oleander may cause contact dermatitis, headache, nausea, lethargy, and high blood levels of potassium, with symptoms appearing within a few hours of ingestion. In one fatality, the blood concentration of oleandrin and a related cardiac glycoside from the oleander plant was estimated at 20 ng/ml. In practice, there have been adult cases wherein 14–20 oleander leaves (of unknown oleandrin concentration) proved not to be fatal, but also a lethal case of a child that consumed only one leaf.

=== Symptoms ===
Symptoms of oleandrin poisoning can cause both gastrointestinal and cardiac effects. The gastrointestinal effects can consist of nausea, abdominal pain, and vomiting, as well as higher salivation and diarrhea (which may contain blood). After these first symptoms, the heart may be affected by tachyarrhythmia, bradyarrhythmia, premature ventricular contractions, or atrioventricular blockage. Also, xanthopsia (yellow vision), a burning sensation of the mucous membranes of the eyes, and gastrointestinal tract and respiratory paralysis can occur. Reactions to poisonings from this plant can also affect the central nervous system. These symptoms can include drowsiness, tremors, or shaking of the muscles, seizures, collapse, and even coma that can lead to death. Oleander sap can cause skin irritations, severe eye inflammation and irritation, and allergy reactions characterized by dermatitis when administered topically.

=== Diagnosis ===
Diagnosis of oleandrin poisoning is mainly based on description of the plant, how much of it was ingested, time since ingestion, and symptoms.

Three methods are used for detecting oleandrin in the blood. Fluorescence polarization immunoassay is widely used. This test is slower and has a lower sensitivity than digoxin immunoassay (Digoxin III). A direct analytic technique like liquid chromatography-electrospray tandem mass spectrometry is used when there are medical or legal issues.

== Treatment ==
Oleander toxicity should be treated aggressively, including as needed gastric lavage or induced emesis. Onset of symptoms may vary with the way of intake. Teas made of leaves or root of N. oleander give rise to a more acute onset, while eating raw leaves causes a slower onset of symptoms. Management of oleandrin poisoning is done in the following steps:

There is a lack of evidence that weighs efficacy versus harm. Activated charcoal is still used, since it binds toxins in the gastrointestinal tract to reduce absorption. It is uncertain whether repeated administration of activated charcoal is effective, in theory interrupting enterohepatic cycling. This treatment is used for digoxin poisoning, another cardiac glycoside. Supportive care like monitoring vitals and electrolyte and fluid balance is important. Patients may present hypovolemic due to vomiting and diarrhea, but severely elevated potassium can also occur. Electrolyte balance is vital, since patients with low cardiac glycoside levels can still die after adequate digoxin Fab antibody treatment if they have disturbed electrolyte levels.

Treatment of slow heart rate and heart rhythm irregularities may require intravenous isoprenaline or atropine. In moderate cases, prolonging of the PR interval and progression to AV dissociation, cardiac pacing is used.

The effectiveness of all these interventions is unknown and are associated with side-effects. Therefore, consultation with a cardiologist is recommended when managing significant N. Oleander induced arrhythmias. The use of anti-digoxin Fab IV has proven successful in cases of oleandrin poisoning

A dose of 400 mg is used in digoxin poisoning, but a dose of 800 mg is recommended for oleandrin poisoning due to the lower binding affinity of the antibody to oleandrin. Patients receiving an adequate dose of anti-digoxin Fab show a good response, resolving serious arrhythmias in two hours in fifty percent of the cases. Treated patients showed a rapid increase in heart rate and a significant decline in serum potassium levels. The reason anti-digoxin Fab is sparingly used in developing countries is its high cost, even though it is such an effective treatment.

== Traditional medicine ==
Although oleander has been used in traditional medicine for treating various disorders, there is no evidence that it is safe or effective for any medicinal purpose.

== Political controversy ==
During the COVID-19 pandemic, Donald Trump's Secretary of Housing and Urban Development Ben Carson, and MyPillow CEO Mike Lindell, a major Trump booster and an investor in a company that develops oleandrin, promoted oleandrin as a potential treatment of the disease in a July 2020 Oval Office meeting with Trump, who expressed enthusiasm for the substance. These claims were widely regarded by scientists as dubious, misleading, and alarming, as well as having no clinical proof of safety or effectiveness.

The unproven claims of benefit further caused concern among scientists that the Trump administration might force unwarranted FDA approval of oleandrin as a safe and effective treatment for COVID-19 infection. However, on 14 August 2020, the FDA rejected the application for marketing an oleandrin dietary supplement by Phoenix Biotechnology, Inc. – the manufacturer of the product – due to concerns that oleandrin would not be safe to consume.

== Effects on animals ==
Oleandrin poisoning by eating oleander leaves can be lethal at low dosages. Cases of sheep lethality have been reported to only one leaf of oleander. Symptoms present in poisoned animals include bloody diarrhea and colic, the latter especially in horses. Because the leaf itself is quite bitter, only starving animals will be likely to eat the plant. The lethal dosage for animals is estimated to be about 0.5 mg/kg.
