= William C. Campbell (scientist) =

Irish-American microbiologist and Nobel laureate in medicine (born 1930)

William C. Campbell FRS
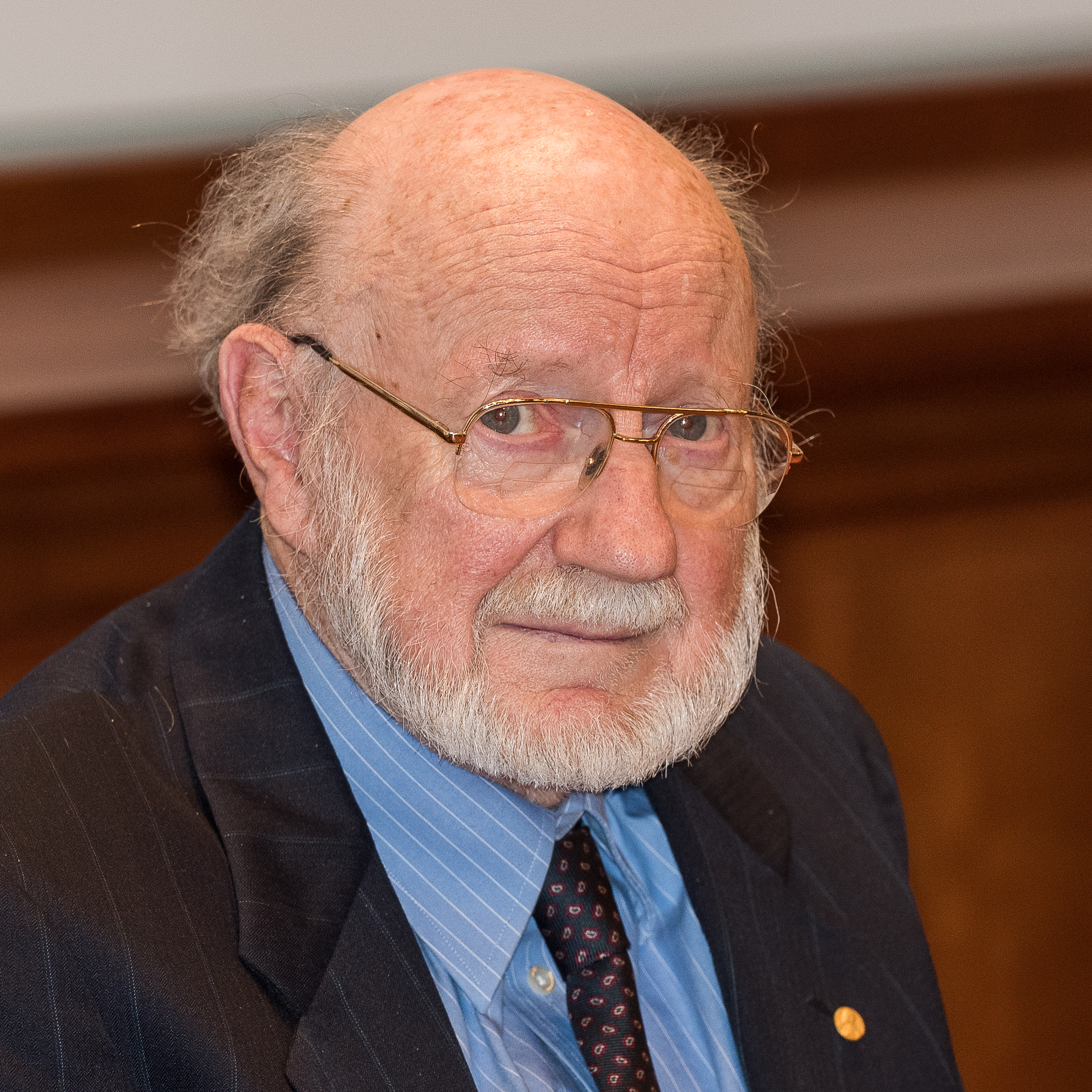
- Campbell in 2015
- Born: 28 June 1930 (age 96); Ramelton, County Donegal, Ireland
- Citizenship: Ireland; United States (since 1964)
- Education: Trinity College, Dublin (B.Sc., 1952); University of Wisconsin–Madison (Ph.D, 1957)
- Known for: Discovery of avermectin
- Awards: Membership of NAS (2002); Nobel Prize in Physiology or Medicine (2015); FRS (2020)
- Scientific career
- Fields: Parasitology
- Workplaces: Merck & Co. Drew University
- Thesis: Fascioloides magna (trematoda) with special reference to the adult in relation to disease (1957)

William Cecil Campbell FRS (born 28 June 1930) is an Irish and American microbiologist known for his work in discovering a novel therapy against infections caused by roundworms, for which he was jointly awarded the 2015 Nobel Prize in Physiology or Medicine. He helped to discover a class of drugs called avermectins, whose derivatives have been shown to have "extraordinary efficacy" in treating River blindness and Lymphatic filariasis, among other parasitic diseases affecting animals and humans. Campbell worked at the Merck Institute for Therapeutic Research 1957–1990, and has become a research fellow emeritus at Drew University.

== Biography ==
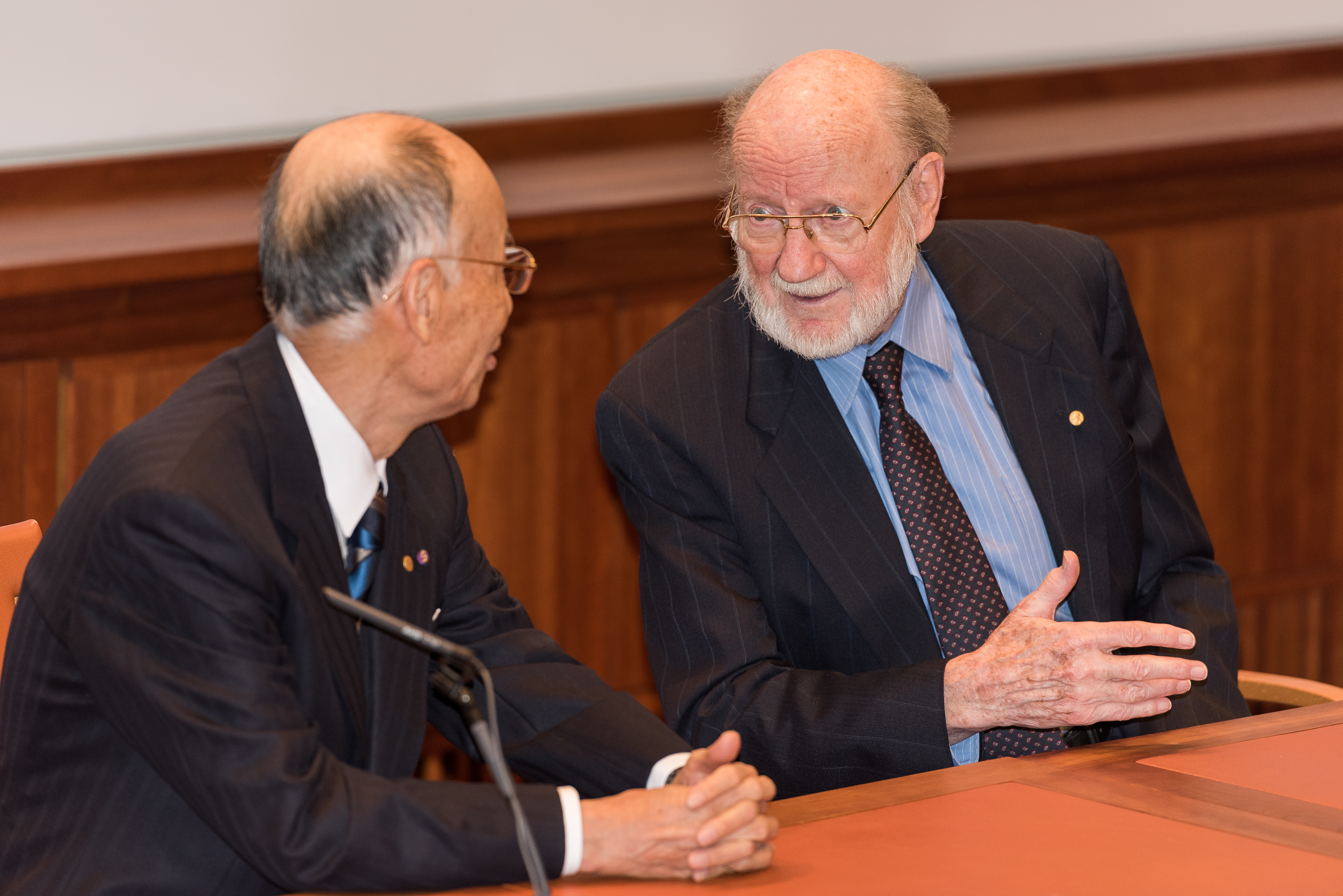
With Satoshi Ōmura (left), Stockholm, December 2015

Campbell was born in Ramelton, County Donegal, Ireland, in 1930, the third son of R. J. Campbell, a farm supplier. He studied at Trinity College, Dublin with James Desmond Smyth, graduating in 1952 with first class honours in Zoology. He then attended the University of Wisconsin–Madison on a Fulbright Scholarship, earning his PhD degree in 1957 for work on the liver fluke, a parasite affecting sheep.

From 1957 to 1990 Campbell worked at Merck Institute for Therapeutic Research, and from 1984 to 1990 he was a Senior Scientist and Director with Assay Research and Development. He became a US citizen in 1964. One of his discoveries while at Merck was the fungicide thiabendazole, used to treat potato blight, historically a scourge of Ireland. Thiabendazole is also used to treat trichinosis in humans.

Campbell is best known for his work on parasitic diseases. Japanese microbiologist Satoshi Ōmura isolated and cultured wide varieties of natural soil-based bacteria from the group Streptomyces. Campbell led a team at Merck in studying Ōmura's cultures and examining their effectiveness in treating parasites in domestic and farm animals. From a sample of Streptomyces avermitilis, naturally occurring in soil, he derived a macrocyclic lactone. After further modification, it was named ivermectin (generic) or Mectizan.

In 1978, having identified a successful treatment for a type of worms affecting horses, Campbell realised that similar treatments might be useful against related types of worms that affect humans. In 1981, Merck carried out successful Phase 1 treatment trials in Senegal and France on river blindness. Taken orally, the drug paralyses and sterilises the parasitic worm that causes the illness. Merck went on to study the treatment of elephantiasis. The research of Satoshi Ōmura, William Campbell, and their co-workers created a new class of drugs for the treatment of parasites.

In 1987, Merck decided to donate Ivermectin (Mectizan) to developing countries. Campbell was instrumental in that decision. With the World Health Organization they created an "unprecedented" drug donation program, with the intention of wiping out river blindness. As of 2001 an estimated 25 million people were being treated each year, in a total of 33 countries in sub-Saharan Africa, Latin America, and the Middle East. As of 2013, the Carter Center's International Task Force for Disease Eradication independently verified that the disease had been eradicated in Colombia, Ecuador, and Mexico.

The greatest challenge for science is to think globally, think simply and act accordingly. It would be disastrous to neglect the diseases of the developing world. One part of the world affects another part. We have a moral obligation to look after each other, but we're also naturally obligated to look after our own needs. It has to be both.

From 1990 to 2010, when he retired, Campbell was a research fellow at Drew University in Madison, N.J., where he supervised undergraduate research and taught courses in parasitology. He has written about the history of parasitology in Antarctic exploration, including the work of surgeon Edward L. Atkinson in Scott's ill-fated Terra Nova Expedition.

In 2002, Campbell was elected member of the United States National Academy of Sciences. In 2015, he and Satoshi Ōmura shared half of the 2015 Nobel Prize in Physiology or Medicine for their research on therapies against infections caused by roundworm parasites, using derivatives of avermectin. Campbell is the seventh Irish person to be awarded a Nobel Prize, including Ernest Walton who was awarded the Nobel Prize in Physics in 1951 and Samuel Beckett for Literature in 1968.

== Personal life ==
William C. Campbell is married to Mary Mastin Campbell. He is a published poet and painter. His recreational activities include table tennis and kayaking.

== Awards ==
- 2002: Membership of the National Academy of Sciences
- 2008: ASP Distinguished Service Award of the American Society of Parasitologists
- 2015: Nobel Prize in Physiology or Medicine for the discovery of avermectin – shared with Satoshi Ōmura and Tu Youyou
- 2020: Fellowship of the Royal Society
- 2021: St Patrick's Day Science Medal of Science Foundation Ireland
