= Pentalenolactone D synthase =

Class of enzymes

Identifiers
- EC no.: 1.14.13.170

Databases
- IntEnz: IntEnz view
- BRENDA: BRENDA entry
- ExPASy: NiceZyme view
- KEGG: KEGG entry
- MetaCyc: metabolic pathway
- PRIAM: profile
- PDB structures: RCSB PDB PDBe PDBsum
Search
- PMC: articles
- PubMed: articles
- NCBI: proteins

Pentalenolactone D synthase (EC 1.14.13.170, penE (gene), pntE (gene)) is an enzyme with systematic name 1-deoxy-11-oxopentalenate,NADH:oxygen oxidoreductase (pentalenolactone-D forming). It catalyses the following chemical reaction

1-deoxy-11-oxopentalenic acid
+ NADPH + H^{+}
O_{2}
H_{2}O
pentalenolactone D
+ NADP^{+}

The four substrates of this enzyme are 1-deoxy-11-oxopentalenic acid, reduced nicotinamide adenine dinucleotide phosphate (NADPH), oxygen, and a proton. It products are pentalenolactone D, oxidised NADP^{+}, and water. The starting ketone is made as part of the biosynthetic pathway to pentalenolactone in Streptomyces avermitilis.

Structure of pentalenolactone

The enzyme is a Baeyer-Villiger monooxygenase that uses flavin adenine dinucleotide as a cofactor.

== See also ==
- Neopentalenolactone D synthase which uses the same starting material but inserts oxygen to form an alternative lactone.
