= Sarmentose (chemistry) =

Chemical compound

d-Sarmentose
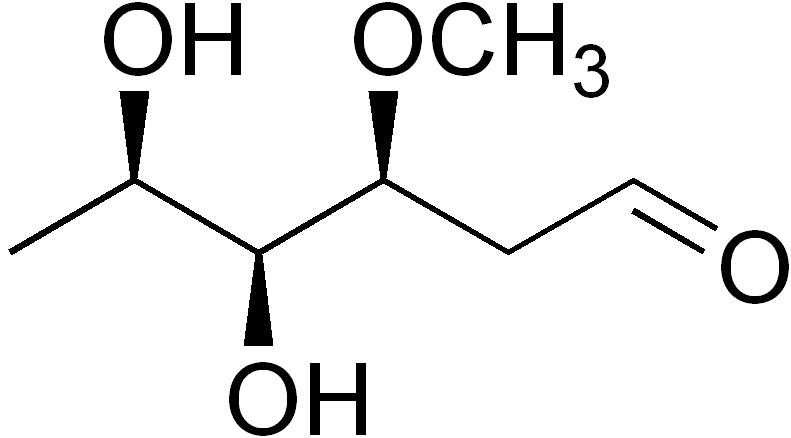

Names
- IUPAC name 2,6-Dideoxy-3-O-methyl-d-xylo-hexose
- Systematic IUPAC name (3S,4S,5R)-4,5-Dihydroxy-3-methoxyhexanal

Identifiers
CAS Number	13484-14-5
3D model (JSmol)	Interactive image
Beilstein Reference	1722807
ChEBI	CHEBI:33982
ChemSpider	16736013
PubChem CID	5460676
UNII	41F6SJ1248
CompTox Dashboard (EPA)	DTXSID201027449 DTXSID30420111, DTXSID201027449
- InChI: InChI=1S/C7H14O4/c1-4-7(9)5(10-2)3-6(8)11-4/h4-9H,3H2,1-2H3/t4-,5+,6?,7+/m0/s1 Key: DBDJCJKVEBFXHG-NTIFKLMLSA-N; InChI=1/C7H14O4/c1-4-7(9)5(10-2)3-6(8)11-4/h4-9H,3H2,1-2H3/t4-,5+,6?,7+/m0/s1 Key: DBDJCJKVEBFXHG-NTIFKLMLBZ
- SMILES: CO[C@@H]1CC(O)O[C@@H](C)[C@H]1O

Properties
Chemical formula	C_{7}H_{14}O_{4}
Molar mass	162.185 g·mol^{−1}
- Except where otherwise noted, data are given for materials in their standard state (at 25 °C [77 °F], 100 kPa). verify (what is ?) Infobox references

Sarmentose is a hexose monosaccharide with the molecular formula C_{7}H_{14}O_{4}, obtained from sarmentocymarin by hydrolysis. It is stereoisomeric with cymarose, and closely related to digitalose, which is obtained by hydrolysis of digitalin.

== See also ==
- Oleandrose, a diastereomeric dideoxy sugar
