= Oleandomycin =

Chemical compound

Clinical data
- AHFS/Drugs.com: International Drug Names
- ATC code: J01FA05 (WHO)

Identifiers
- IUPAC name: (3R,5R,6S,7R,8R,11R,12S,13R,14S,15S)-14-((2S,3R,4S,6R)-4-(dimethylamino)-3-hydroxy-6-methyltetrahydro-2H-pyran-2-yloxy)-6-hydroxy-12-((2R,4S,5S,6S)-5-hydroxy-4-methoxy-6-methyltetrahydro-2H-pyran-2-yloxy)-5,7,8,11,13,15-hexamethyl-1,9-dioxaspiro[2.13]hexadecane-4,10-dione
- CAS Number: 3922-90-5
- PubChem CID: 5284598
- ChemSpider: 4447646
- UNII: P8ZQ646136
- ChEMBL: ChEMBL606258
- E number: E704 (antibiotics)
- CompTox Dashboard (EPA): DTXSID4023389
- ECHA InfoCard: 100.021.360

Chemical and physical data
- Formula: C_{35}H_{61}NO_{12}
- Molar mass: 687.868 g·mol^{−1}
- 3D model (JSmol): Interactive image
- SMILES: O=C4[C@H](C)[C@@H](O)[C@@H](C)[C@H](OC(=O)[C@@H]([C@@H](O[C@@H]1O[C@H]([C@H](O)[C@@H](OC)C1)C)[C@H](C)[C@@H](O[C@@H]2O[C@H](C)C[C@H](N(C)C)[C@H]2O)[C@@H](C)C[C@@]43OC3)C)C
- InChI: InChI=1S/C35H61NO12/c1-16-14-35(15-43-35)32(40)19(4)27(37)18(3)22(7)46-33(41)21(6)31(47-26-13-25(42-11)28(38)23(8)45-26)20(5)30(16)48-34-29(39)24(36(9)10)12-17(2)44-34/h16-31,34,37-39H,12-15H2,1-11H3/t16-,17+,18-,19+,20+,21+,22+,23-,24-,25-,26-,27-,28-,29+,30-,31-,34-,35-/m0/s1; Key:RZPAKFUAFGMUPI-KGIGTXTPSA-N

Oleandomycin is a macrolide antibiotic. It is synthesized from strains of Streptomyces antibioticus. It is weaker than erythromycin.

It used to be sold under the brand name Sigmamycine, combined with tetracycline, and made by the company Rosa-Phytopharma in France.

== Medical uses ==
Oleandomycin inhibits the bacteria responsible for upper respiratory tract infections. Its spectrum of activity includes bacteria in the Staphylococcus and Enterococcus genera.

The MIC for oleandomycin is 0.3-3 μg/mL for Staphylococcus aureus.

Oleandomycin is approved as a veterinary antibiotic in some countries. It has been approved as a swine and poultry antibiotic in the United States. However, it is currently only approved in the United States for production uses.

== Pharmacology ==
=== Mechanism of action ===
Oleandomycin is a bacteriostatic agent. Like erythromycin, oleandomycin binds to the 50s subunit of bacterial ribosomes, inhibiting the completion of proteins vital to survival and replication. It interferes with translational activity but also with 50s subunit formation.

However, unlike erythromycin and its effective synthetic derivatives, it lacks a 12-hydroxyl group and a 3-methoxy group. This change in structure may adversely affect its interactions with 50S structures and explain why it is a less powerful antibiotic.

=== Relative strength ===
Oleandomycin is far less effective than erythromycin in bacterial minimum inhibitory concentration tests involving staphylococci or enterococci. However, macrolide antibiotics can accumulate in organs or cells and this effect can prolong the bioactivity of this category of antibiotics even if its concentration in plasma is below what is considered capable of a therapeutic effect.

== Chemistry ==
=== Polyketide biosynthesis ===
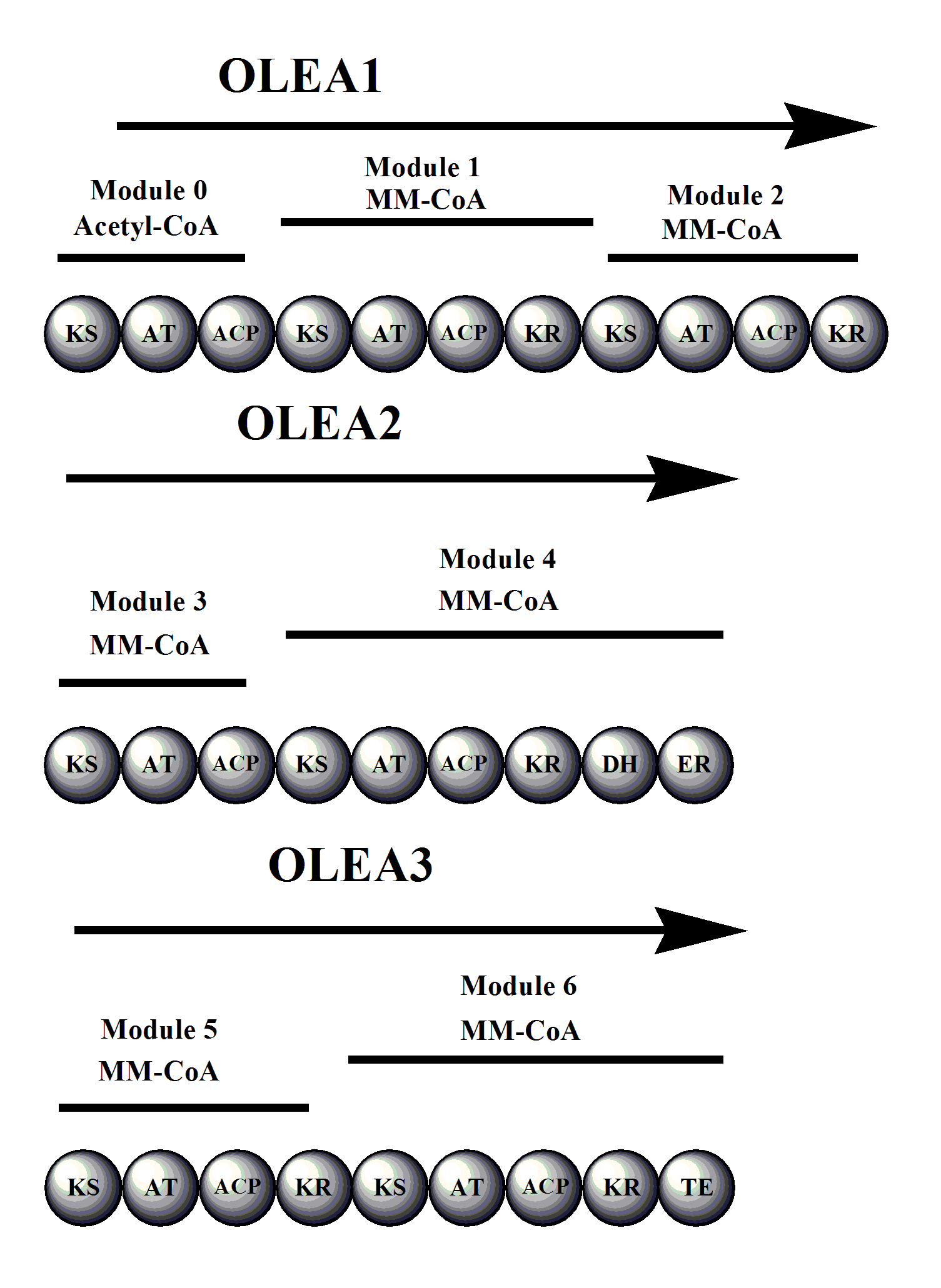
Polyketide Synthase Type I scheme of the synthesis of 8,8 deoxyoleanolide, the precursor to oleandomycin

The oleandomycin synthase (OLES) follows the module structure of a type I synthase. The polyketide chain is bound through thioester linkages to the S-H groups of the ACP and KS domains

- The gene cluster OLES1 codes for modules 0-2, module 0 containing an acetyl-CoA starter unit and all remaining moduless carrying a methyl malonyl-CoA elongation unit attached to its keto synthase unit.
- OLES2 codes for modules 3 and 4. Module 3 is notable for potentially carrying a redox-inactive ketoreductase that is responsible for retaining the unreduced carbonyl adjacent to carbon 8.
- OLES3 codes for modules 5 and 6.

The amino acid sequence similarities between OLES and 6-Deoxyerythronolide B synthase (erythromycin precursor synthase) show only a 45% common identity. Note that unlike in the erythromycin precursor synthase, there is a KS in the loading domain of OLES.

=== Post-PKS modifications ===
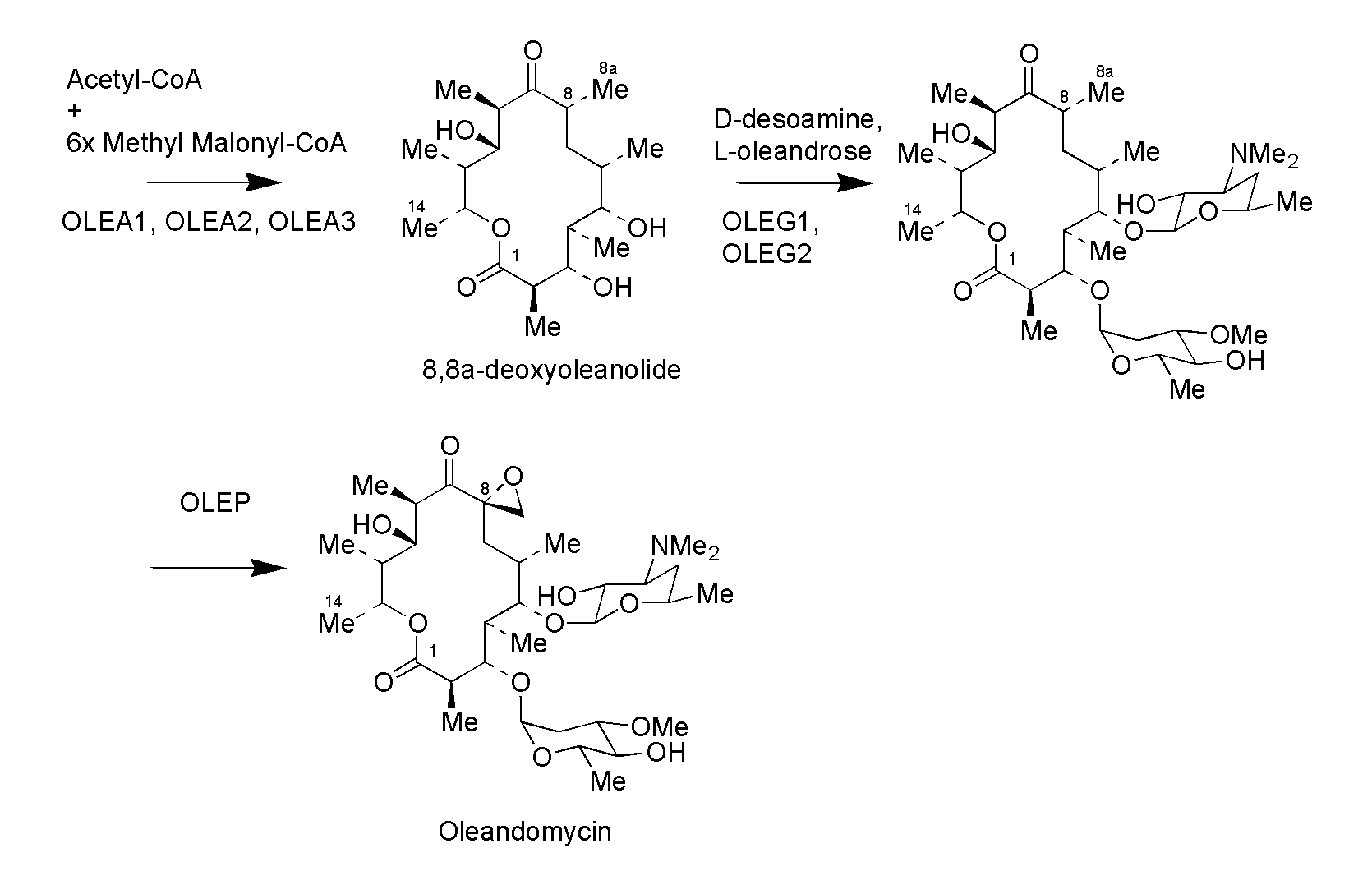
Post-polyketide tailoring of 8,8' deoxyoleanolide to form oleandomycin

The genes OleG1 and G2 are responsible for the glycosyltransferases that attach oleandomycin's characteristic sugars to the macrolide. These sugars are derived from TDP-glucose. OLEG1 transfers dTDP-D-desoamine and OleG2 transfers D-TDP-L-oleandrose to the macrolide ring. The epoxidation that occurs afterwards is from the enzyme encoded by OleP, which could be homologous with a P450 enzyme. The method by which OleP epoxidates is suspected to be a dihydroxylation followed by the conversion of a hydroxyl group into a phosphate group that then leaves via a nucleophilic ring closure by the other hydroxyl group.

== History ==
Oleandomycin was first discovered as a product of the bacterium Streptomyces antibioticus in 1954 by Dr. Sobin, English, and Celmer. In 1960, Hochstein successfully managed to determine the structure of oleandomycin. This macrolide was discovered at around the same time as its relatives erythromycin and spiramycin.

=== Sigmamycine combination drug ===
Public interest in oleandomycin peaked when Pfizer introduced the combination drug Sigmamycine into the market in 1956. Sigmamycine was a combination drug of oleandomycin and tetracycline that was supported by a major marketing campaign. It was in fact claimed that a 2:1 mixture of tetracycline and oleandomycin had a synergistic effect on staphylococci. It was also claimed that the mixture would be effective on organisms that are mostly resistant to tetracycline or oleandomycin alone. Both of these claims were refuted by findings such as those by Lawrence P. Garrod that could find no evidence that such claims were properly substantiated. By the early 1970s, Pfizer's combination drugs were withdrawn from the market.

== Society and culture ==
=== Brand names ===
- Mastalone – Oleandomycin, oxatetracycline, neomycin – Zoetis Australia and Pfizer Animal Health
- Mastiguard – Oleandomycin, oxatetracycline – Stockguard Animal Health
- Formerly sold as Sigmamycine by Pfizer (Oleandomycin + Tetracycline + Vitamin C)
