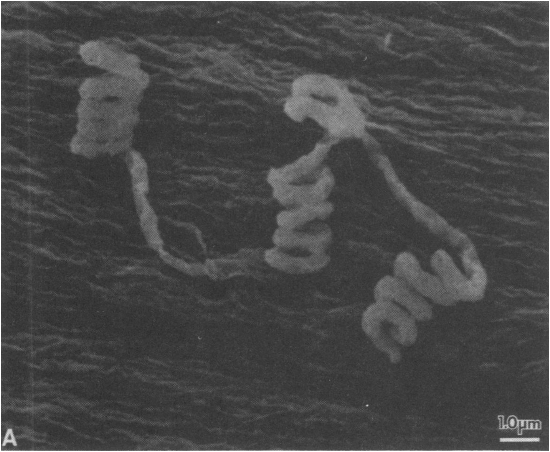

Scientific classification
- Domain: Bacteria
- Kingdom: Bacillati
- Phylum: Actinomycetota
- Class: Actinomycetes
- Order: Streptomycetales
- Family: Streptomycetaceae
- Genus: Streptomyces
- Species: S. avermitilis

Binomial name
- Streptomyces avermitilis (ex Burg et al. 1979) Kim and Goodfellow 2002

Strains
- Streptomyces avermitilis MA-4680

Synonyms
- Streptomyces avermectinius Takahashi et al. 2002

= Streptomyces avermitilis =

Species of bacterium

Streptomyces avermitilis is a species of bacteria in the genus Streptomyces. This bacterium was discovered by Satoshi Ōmura in soil from a golf course in Shizuoka Prefecture, Japan.

The first complete genome sequence of S. avermitilis was completed in 2003. The genome consists of a single chromosome with a linear structure, unlike most bacterial genomes, which exist in the form of circular chromosomes.

Avermectins are industrially derived from the fermentation products of S. avermitilis. Avermectin itself was discovered by the Satoshi Ōmura group and first disclosed in Burg et al. 1979. One of the most widely employed drugs against nematode and arthropod infestations is the avermectin derivative ivermectin, as well as abamectin, a widely used insecticide and antihelmintic.

== See also ==
- List of Streptomyces species
