= EFP =

EFP may refer to:

== Politics ==
- Economic Freedom Party, in Kenya
- England First Party, in England
- European Federalist Party, a French political party and former European political alliance
- Ethiopian Federal Police, law enforcement agency of Ethiopia

== Professional bodies ==
- École Freudienne de Paris, a former French psychoanalytic body
- European Federation for Primatology
- European Federation of Parasitologists
- European Federation of Periodontology

== Other uses ==
- École Franco-Polonaise, a defunct Franco-Polish School in Poznań, Poland
- Effective Fragment Potential Method
- Electronic field production
- Electronic fuel pump
- Eleven Football Pro, a Lebanese association football academy
  - Eleven Football Pro WFC, a women's association football club in Beirut, Lebanon
- Elongation factor P, a prokaryotic protein translation factor
- Equestrian Federation of Pakistan
- European Film Promotion, a network of European film promotion organisations
- European Firearms Pass
- Exchange for Physicals, an off-market trading mechanism
- Explosively formed penetrator
- NATO Enhanced Forward Presence
- TRIM25, encoding the tripartite motif-containing protein 25
