= Giovanni Maria Lancisi =

Italian physician, epidemiologist and anatomist (1654–1720)

Giovanni Maria Lancisi FRS
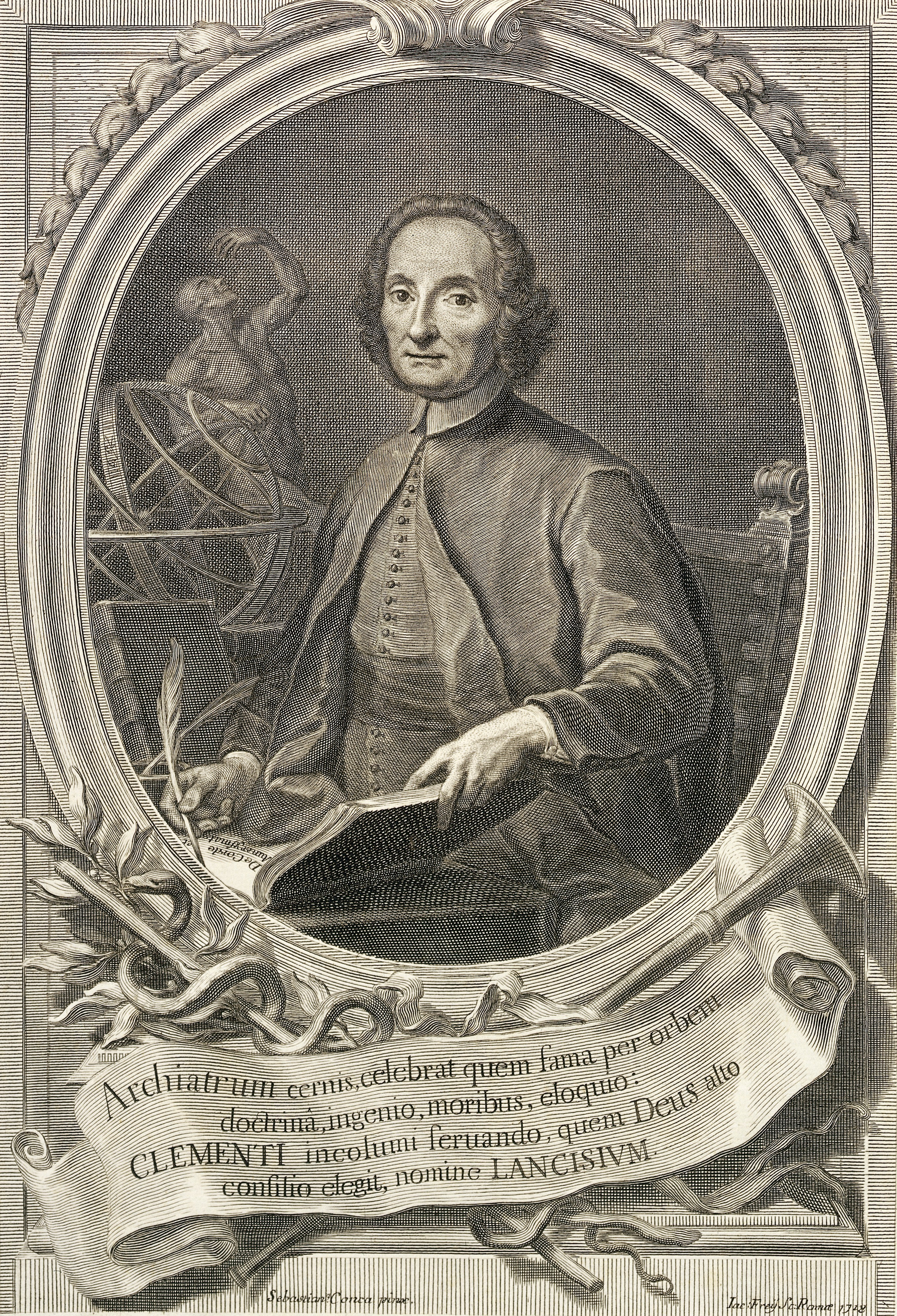
- Giovanni Maria Lancisi
- Born: 26 October 1654; Rome, Papal States
- Died: 20 January 1720 (aged 65); Rome, Papal States
- Education: University of Rome
- Known for: malaria cardiovascular diseases
- Scientific career
- Fields: medicine anatomy
- Workplaces: University of Rome

Giovanni Maria Lancisi (Latin: Johannes Maria Lancisius; 26 October 1654 – 20 January 1720) was an Italian physician, epidemiologist and anatomist who made a correlation between the presence of mosquitoes and the prevalence of malaria. He was also known for his studies about cardiovascular diseases, an examination of the corpus callosum of the brain, and is remembered in the eponymous Lancisi's sign. He also studied rinderpest during an outbreak of the disease in Europe.

== Biography ==
Giovanni Maria Lancisi was born in Rome on 26 October 1654. His mother died shortly after his birth and he was raised by his aunt in Orvieto. He was educated at the Collegio Romano and the University of Rome, where by the age of 18, he had qualified in medicine. He worked at hospital of Santo Spirito in Sassia and trained at the Picentine College, Lauro. In 1684 he went to Sapienza University and held the chair of anatomy for thirteen years. He served as physician to Popes Innocent XI, Clement XI and Innocent XII. Clement XI gave Lancisi, the anatomical plates of Bartolomeo Eustachius; made originally in 1562 and had been forgotten or lost in the Vatican Library. Lancisi edited and published them in 1714 as the Tabulae anatomicae.

Lancisi studied epidemiology, describing the epidemics of malaria and influenza. He published De Noxiis Paludum Effluviis (On the Noxious Effluvia of Marshes) in 1717, in which he recognized that mosquito-infested swamps are the breeding ground for malaria and recommended drainage of these areas to prevent the disease. He also published extensively on cardiology, describing vegetations on heart valves, cardiac syphilis, aneurysms and the classification of heart disease. His landmark De Motu Cordis et Aneurysmatibus was published posthumously in 1728, edited by Pietro Assalti who also conducted the autopsy of Lancisi and identified his death as being caused by a duodenal infarction.

Early in the 18th century, Lancisi had protested the medieval approaches to containing rinderpest in cattle by stating that "it is better to kill all sick and suspect animals, instead of allowing the disease to spread in order to have enough time and the honour to discover a specific treatment that is often searched for without any success". Lancisi advised restricting the movement animals; quarantine; separation and confinement of infected animals, recovered animals; and of farmers and their animals. These sanitary measures were an early approach in the control of rinderpest (Lancisi, 1715), a procedure that was later adopted by Thomas Bates.

However, Lancisi also erred, as he disputed the work of Giovanni Cosimo Bonomo (1663-1696), his contemporary, who had correctly identified the cause of scabies as a parasite. Lancisi however, despite being progressive in other medical areas, continued to subscribe to the Galenic concept of scabies as a disease of the blood. Because of Lancisi's powerful position and, because previous scientists like Galileo Galilei had fallen into disgrace, Bonomo was silenced and his discovery was forgotten until the modern era.

== Studies on the brain and the soul ==
Lancisi described the corpus callosum as the "seat of the soul, which imagines, deliberates and judges." His Dissertatio Physiognomica provided the supporting argument in 1713. He opposed alternative locations of the soul as hypothesized by others, such as the centrum ovale, by Andreas Vesalius, and the pineal gland, by René Descartes. He hypothesized that the longitudinal striae (later named in his honor as the "striae lancisi" or "nerves of Lancisi") were the conduit between the anterior location of the soul, and the posterior location of sensory organ functions, both within the corpus callosum.
