= Crotamiton =

Chemical compound

Clinical data
- Trade names: Eurax, others
- AHFS/Drugs.com: Monograph
- Routes of administration: Topical
- ATCvet code: QP53AX04 (WHO)

Legal status
- Legal status: US: ℞-only

Identifiers
- IUPAC name: (E)-N-Ethyl-N-(2-methylphenyl)but-2-enamide
- CAS Number: 483-63-6
- PubChem CID: 688020
- DrugBank: DB00265
- ChemSpider: 599515
- UNII: D6S4O4XD0H
- KEGG: D01381
- ChEMBL: ChEMBL1200709
- CompTox Dashboard (EPA): DTXSID6040664
- ECHA InfoCard: 100.006.907

Chemical and physical data
- Formula: C_{13}H_{17}NO
- Molar mass: 203.285 g·mol^{−1}
- 3D model (JSmol): Interactive image
- SMILES: O=C(N(c1ccccc1C)CC)/C=C/C
- InChI: InChI=1S/C13H17NO/c1-4-8-13(15)14(5-2)12-10-7-6-9-11(12)3/h4,6-10H,5H2,1-3H3/b8-4+; Key:DNTGGZPQPQTDQF-XBXARRHUSA-N

Crotamiton is a medication that is used both as a scabicidal (for treating scabies) and as a general antipruritic (anti-itching drug). It is a topical medication.

== Medical uses ==
Crotamiton is indicated for the symptomatic treatment of pruritic skin and the eradication of scabies.

For treating scabies, crotamiton should be applied to the whole body rather than a localized area. It is applied two or three times, with a 24-hour delay between applications, and the patient is asked to take a shower no sooner than after 48 hours. For children under 3 years, it is applied once daily. It can also be used to treat itching stemming from other causes, e.g. insect bites, in which case it is applied to the itching areas only, and repeated if necessary after 4 to 8 hours. Use near the eyes, or breaks in the skin, should be avoided.

== Pharmacology ==
Crotamiton is toxic to the scabies mite. It probably acts as a general antipruritic by inhibition of TRPV4, a sensory ion channel that is expressed in the skin and primary sensory neurons.

== Pharmacokinetics ==
After topical application, crotamiton is absorbed systemically. It has an elimination half-life of 30.9 hours and 4.8-8.8% is excreted in the urine.

== Side effects ==
The most common side effect of crotamiton is skin irritation.

== Brand names ==
Crotamiton is sold under the brand names Eurax, Crotan, Euracin, and Crotamitex.
