= Flystrike in sheep =

Infestation of sheep with parasitic maggots

Flystrike in sheep is a myiasis condition in which domestic sheep are infected by one of several species of flies that are external parasites of sheep. Sheep are particularly susceptible to flystrike because their thick wool, if sufficiently contaminated with urine and faecal material, can provide effective breeding ground for maggots even in the relative absence of wounds.

== Causes ==
Flystrike in sheep is a condition where parasitic flies lay eggs on soiled wool or open wounds. After hatching, the maggots bury themselves in the sheep's wool and eventually under the sheep's skin, feeding off their flesh. Once the larvae develop, flies continue to deposit eggs on to new or already infected sheep, starting the infection process over again. Sheep display symptoms such as agitation, loss of appetite, odour and matted wool, many of which further encourage the attraction of flies. Fly strike can be lethal for sheep due to ammonia poisoning.

Flystrike is problematic, not only causing loss or degradation of stock, but also requiring expenditure of both money and time for effective management. In Australia, Lucilia cuprina causes about 90% of infestations, and Chrysomya rufifacies is the most common secondary pest that targets wounds caused by L. cuprina.

== Identification of infected sheep ==
Flystruck sheep are identified in the flock by characteristic green or wet-looking patches in the sheep's fleece, usually around the haunches or tail, or at the site of an open wound, where wool can create a damper area that is more attractive to flies. In male sheep the penile region is also a common area for flystrike to occur. When the flock settle, infected sheep will display signs of agitation, such as foot stamping or turning to nibble their body. Flystruck animals often have a strong characteristic odour and, in severe cases, the wet-looking wool can begin to shed. Fly strike is more likely to be found in favorable environmental conditions such as temperatures between 15–38 °C (59–100 °F), recent rain, and wind speeds below 9 kilometres per hour (5.6 mph).

The peak UK green bottle fly breeding season tends to be in late June or July, but flystrike can occur at any time warm damp conditions prevail and green bottles are active.

== Prevention ==
There are several preventative measures that are used to reduce the occurrence of flystrike in sheep flocks; these include:

- Controlling intestinal parasites to prevent scours and a suitable surface for flystrike
- Scheduled shearing and crutching
- Removing the tails of lambs at weaning
- Mulesing
- Preventative chemical treatments before fly infestation risk is high
- Breeding for traits that reduce the likelihood of infestation
- Removing or avoiding large manure heaps or other sites attractive to the flies
- Using fly traps near the flock to attract and kill any local flies, helping to minimise the local populations. Note: Traps often emit a pungent smell and are best placed away from human activity.

None of these measures completely stop the occurrence of flystrike in sheep, and regular treatment is still necessary.

== See also ==
- Mange
- Sarcoptes scabiei
- Sheep dip
