= Giacinto Cestoni =

Italian naturalist (1637–1718)

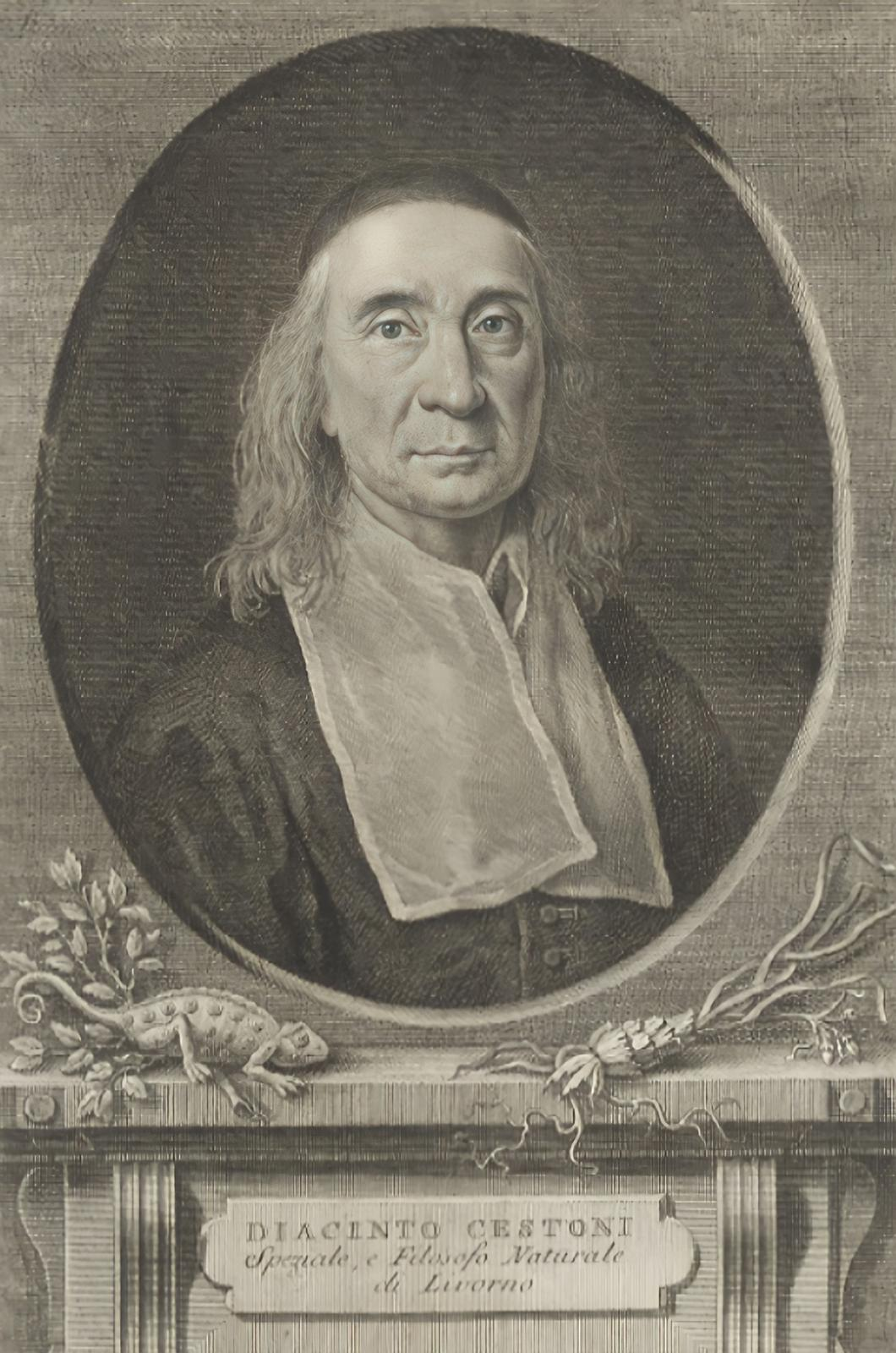
- Born: 13 May 1637; Montegiorgio, region of Marche, Italy
- Died: 29 January 1718 (aged 80); Livorno, Italy
- Other name: Diacinto Cestoni
- Occupations: Biologist, naturalist, botanist, entomologist
- Known for: Discovery of the acarian origin of scabies
- Spouse: Margherita Tiburzi (m. 1671)

Diacinto (or Giacinto) Cestoni (13 May 1637 – 29 January 1718) was an Italian naturalist, biologist, botanist and entomologist. Born in Montegiorgio, he was self-taught. He lived and worked at Livorno where he led an apothecary next to the port. He studied insects, animals, plants and drugs. Cestoni discovered that scabies is caused by the microscopic mite Sarcoptes scabiei.

== Biography ==
Cestoni was born in a poor household in Montegiorgio, region of Marche, to Vittorio and Settimia Cestoni. When Cestoni was 11, he left school and entered in the service of a local apothecary where he spent two years as an apprentice, preparing and selling medicines.

Cestoni's time with the local apothecary in Montegiorgio piqued his interest towards natural sciences and in 1650 his family sent him to Rome, where he worked under Roman pharmacist Francesco Boncori. He lived and worked in Rome for the next few years.

In 1656, Cestoni moved to the port city of Livorno where he started working in Francesco Salomoni's apothecary shop. After working in Salomoni's shop for a brief time period, Cestoni left Livorno and would spend the next several years traveling through different cities including Marseille and Lyon to Geneva, practicing and conducting research.

Cestoni returned to Livorno in 1666, resuming administrative duties at his former employer Salomoni's store. He married Salomoni's wife's sister Margherita Tiburzi in 1668. Seven years into the marriage the couple had a son who died a few months after birth.

In 1680, Cestoni became acquainted with physician Francesco Redi. The two became friends and began a lively correspondence, which is known chiefly through Redi's letters. The scientific correspondence between the two researchers lasted years until the death of Redi in 1697. Influenced by Redi, Cestoni furthered his research and would often ask his friends for advice.

After Redi's death, Cestoni began to write letters to Antonio Vallisnieri discussing his scientific observations. The two exchanged 583 letters over the next twenty years. Most of Cestoni's research observations recorded in these letters were made before 1697. Vallisnieri published part of Cestoni's observations, inserting them into his own works or into journals such as the Galleria di Minerva and the Giornale de’ letterati d’Italia. Among the few observations published abroad were those on the metamorphic cycle of the flea which appeared in the Philosophical Transactions of the Royal Society.

Cestoni died on 29 January 1718. He was suffering from bladder stones and urethral stenosis.

== Scientific Research ==
Cestoni was self taught. He had no academic qualifications and started making observations at a young age and although he never had a proper education most of what he learned was through his own observations and through collaborating with others including Francesco Redi and Antonio Vallisnieri. He composed several works on natural history. Most of his research was printed in the works of his friend Vallisnieri.

=== Pharmacology ===
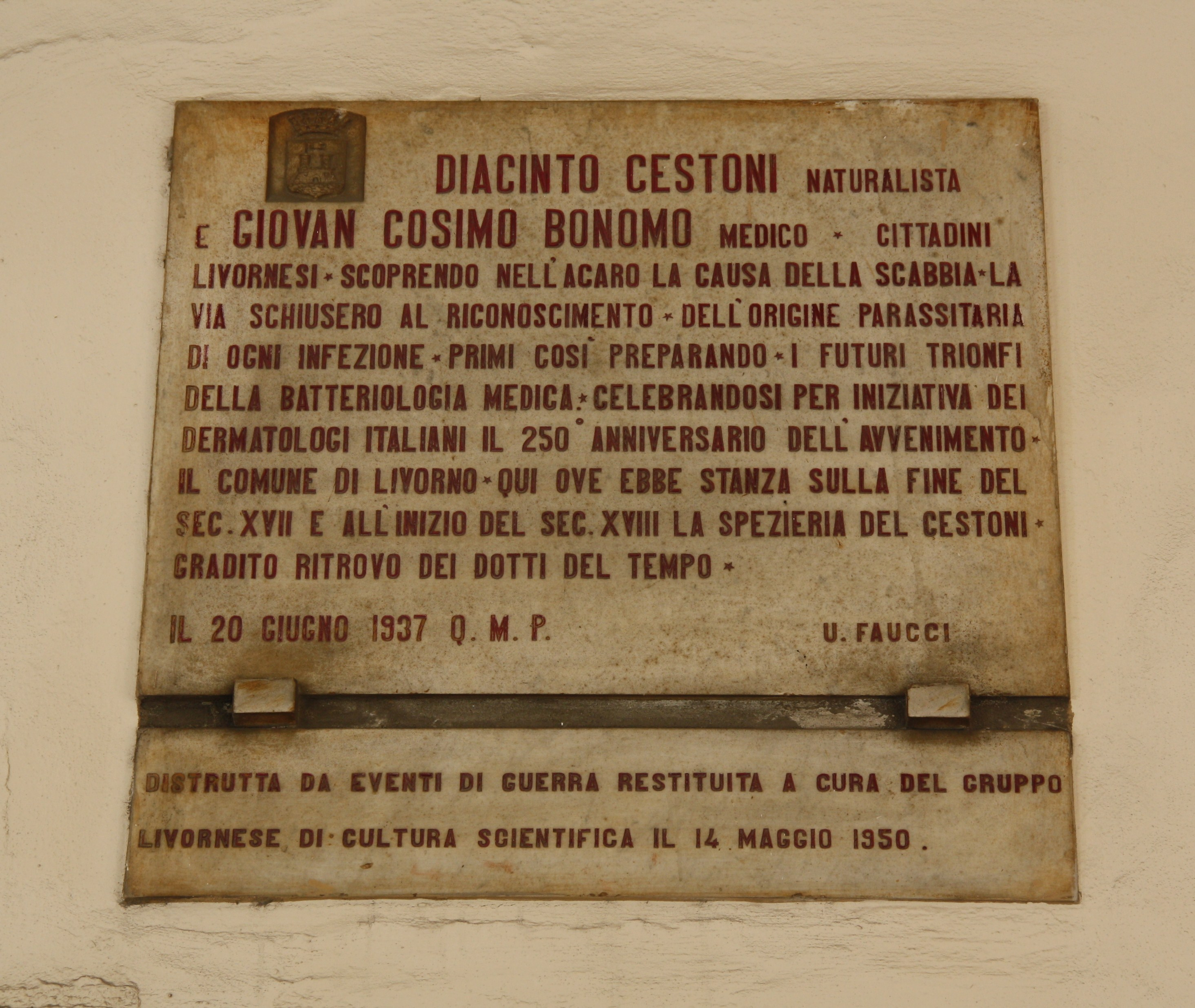
Plaque dedicated to Diacinto Cestoni and Giovan Cosimo Bonomo for their scientific contributions.

Cestoni's had an interest in plants and herbs, analyzing drugs and their medicinal effects. The pharmacological aspect was extensively treated by Cestoni, who among other things was always very attentive to the different opinions on the use of medicines. As an apothecary he studied different contagious diseases and carried out treatment trials using different drugs. The method followed by Cestoni for medicines was through trial and testing, and observing on their effectiveness. Since Cestoni was not a doctor he heavily relied on consulting his friend Redi for many of his medical trials.

Evidence of his main pharmacological studies are found in his letters to Redi and other friends and colleagues. In these letters, Cestoni recorded observations of many plants including sarsaparilla and Cinchona.

Cestoni's research on cinchona was important at the time. He was able to devise a safe treating mechanism using cinchona which he shared with his friend Vallisnieri in letters. He made some recommendations regarding cinchona. Cestoni wrote about its effectiveness in powdered form and the dosage and methodology of consuming the drug.

In his correspondences with his friend, Cestoni also wrote about his observations and experiments with Sarsaparilla. Cestoni examined the sarsaparilla, a plant whose roots are used to make medicine, also historically used in treating syphilis. Cestoni was able to prepare a decoction and also provided information on the method and the exact dose of administration.

Cestoni also studied the effects of foods and drinks such as chocolate, coffee and lemongrass. Cestoni believed that chocolate consumption should be balanced. He called it nutritious but bad for the stomach if consumed in large quantities. In his letters, Cestoni indicates that he did not consider chocolate a medicine, but a tasty food that's hard to digest and therefore whoever consumes it in small quantities will be healthy. He recommended health compromised individuals not to take it.

=== Biology ===
His main research area was observing insect reproduction, and through his observation with a microscope he eventually discovered the viviparity and parthenogenesis of aphids.

Among one of his letters sent to Vallisneri on 19 August 1697, he revealed that he had observed flea's eggs and that from these eggs "lactated white bacherelli" were born which, after two weeks, grew and made a silk thread come out of their mouth. which was used for the construction of the cocoon; the flea grew inside the cocoon and formed completely before exiting. He also observed other insect species including green grasshoppers, scorpions, woodworms, cabbage insects, worms and studied insect galls and discovered galls on oak trees were caused by flies.

He also studied the coral and his investigations on coral are found in a study made by G. De Toni. who stated in 1723 that Cestoni had asserted that the coral was nothing but "an insect similar to a small sea oyster or octopus."

Among microorganisms, Cestoni studied infusoria in water and also significantly studied vinegar eels (Anguillula vinegar), which are found in unfiltered vinegar.

In some of his letters addressed to Redi, Cestoni discussed with his friend about stones in the stomach of birds and grafts. He correctly deduced that the stones actually helped the birds in digestion. Cestoni experimented with grafting and attempted to transplant the spur of a chicken onto the head of a rooster.

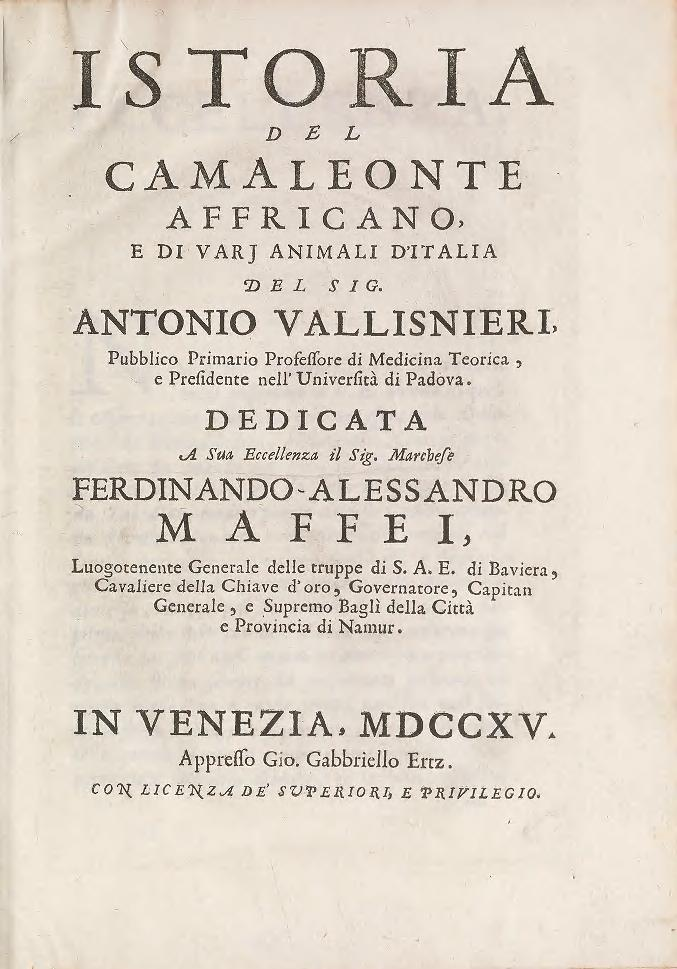
Title of Cestoni's published research on Chameleon and other animals.

Perhaps his most notable work was on the research he did on scabies. He collaborated with a physician from Livorno who was a disciple of Redi, Giovan Cosimo Bonomo. Cestoni and Bonomo described the life history of the itch mite, Sarcoptes Scabiei that causes scabies. Cestoni helped in discovering the link of the mite with scabies. He observed the mite under a microscope uncovering details about the mite's life history, means of infection, and effective vs ineffective treatments. These conclusions were controversial in his day, and opposed by prominent physicians such as Giovanni Maria Lancisi, the Pope's chief physician in Rome, since the established belief was that scabies was caused by an excess of black humour (melaina colè). Cestoni shared his findings with Redi in one of his letters he sent in 1687. Cestoni published six illustrations of the life cycle and discussed the means of transmission to new hosts. Cestoni also wrote to Vallisnieri in 1710 that he, not Bonomo, had discovered that scabies was caused by a mite.

=== Zoology ===
Cestoni was interested in studying animals. He studied invertebrates such as arthropods, molluscs, worms and vertebrates. He studied eels, "vinegar eels", "worms" and caterpillars, barnacles, cockroaches, ship mists (lamellibranch mollusc known today as teredine), ants, earthworms, praying mantis, millipedes (myriapods), flies, oysters, fish, lice, bat, green lizard, frog, sea urchin, swallows, toads, salamander, scarab, scolopendra, "flying beetle", "water scorpion", sponges, woodworms, turtle, tapeworms, tarantulas, wasps, vipers, mosquito, ticks, zoophytes.

He significantly studied chameleons and his keen interest in it can be seen in the letters he exchanged with his friends. His work on chameleons was also published in his friend Vallisnieri's work "Istoria del Camaleonte affricano, e di varj animali d'Italia".

Through systematic direct observations he had managed to draw a precise picture of the animal's habits. He was able to disprove the myth at the time about chameleons that they do not eat and drink and just lived on air. He observed their eating habits and found out that they eat insects including crickets, grasshoppers, butterflies, spiders, white snails, lizards, winged ants. Though he spent a lot of time observing the chameleon he was not able to provide an explanation for the shift in its colors. Vallisneri's research on chameleons was significantly based on observations of Cestoni.

== Publications ==
Most of Cestoni's work was published in the works of his friend Vallisnieri. All of his composed work is in Italian.

- Dell'Origine delle pulci dall'uovo, e del seme dell'alga marina. This small work was published by Vallisnieri, with one of his treatises, in Padua, in 1713, in-4°
- Descrizioni ossia compendio del balsamo Pinelli, Bologna, 1696, in-12
- Istoria della grana del kermès e di un altra nera grana che si trova negli elici delle campagne di Livorno, pag. 459 of the Volume I of "Opere" by Antonio Vallisnieri
- Maravigliose scoperte dell'origine di molti animalucci su le foglie de' cavoli. This memoir was inserted in a book published in Padua under this title: Trattato di remedj per le malattie del corpo humano, Padoue, 1709, in-4°
- Memorie concernenti la storia naturale e la medicina, tratte dalle lettere inedite di Giacinto Cestoni, al cav. Ant. Vallisnieri. Opuscoli scelti, t.10
- Osservazioni intorno alli pellicelli del corpo umano, insieme con altre nuove osservazioni. This journal was published at Florence in 1687. Cestoni discusses his observations about scabies and shows that it is caused by Sarcoptes scabiei
- Vere condizioni della salsapariglia, del modo di conoscere la vera e di darla, come venga adulterata, ed in quali mali convenga, ed in quale maniera più efficace. This was a letter discussing sarsaparilla, its medicinal effects, and how to use it for the treatment of diseases
- "Vero modo di dare, e preparare la Chinachina". La Galleria di Minerva. VI: 59. 1708.

== Bibliography ==
- Bernardi, Walter; Dini, Alessandro; Tanga, Mario (2004–2006). "Giacinto Cestoni, i rapporti con Redi e le scienze della vita nel XVII secolo" (PDF). Università degli Studi di Pisa.
- Bonomo, Giovanni Cosimo (1686). Osservazioni intorno a' pellicelli del corpo umano fatte dal dottor Gio. Cosimo Bonomo, e da lui con altre osservazioni scritte in una lettera all'illustriss. sig. Francesco Redi. Firenze.
- Laghi, Armando (1966). "Giacinto Cestoni speziale e naturalista". Atti e Memorie della Deputazione di storia patria per le Marche. IV (1): 67–86.
- Egerton, Frank N. (2005). "A History of the Ecological Sciences, Part 17: Invertebrate Zoology and Parasitology during the 1600s". Bulletin of the Ecological Society of America. 86 (3): 133–144.
- Egerton, Frank N. (2008). "A History of the Ecological Sciences, Part 30: Invertebrate Zoology and Parasitology During the 1700s". The Bulletin of the Ecological Society of America. 89 (4): 407-433. doi:10.1890/0012-9623(2008)89[407:AHOTES]2.0.CO;2.
- Luzzini, Francesco (2015). "Through dark and mysterious paths. Early modern science and the search for the origin of springs from the 16th to the 18th centuries". Earth Sciences History. 34 (2): 169–189. Bibcode:2015ESHis..34..169L. doi:10.17704/1944-6187-34.2.169. hdl:10278/3743244.
- Priori, Domenico (2009). "La chimica nell'Epistolario ad Antonio Vallisnieri". Atti del XIII Convegno Nazionale di Storia e Fondamenti della Chimica: 105–114.
- Vallisnieri, Antonio (1715). Istoria del Camaleonte affricano, e di varj animali d'Italia. Venezia. doi:10.5962/bhl.title.110838.
- Belloni, Luigi (1971). "Cestoni, Giacinto". In Charles Coulston Gillispie (ed.). Dictionary of Scientific Biography. Vol. 3. New York: Charles Scribner's Sons. pp. 180–1.
- Baldini, Ugo (1980). "CESTONI, Giacinto". Dizionario Biografico degli Italiani (in Italian). Vol. 24: Cerreto–Chini. Rome: Institute of the Italian Encyclopaedia. ISBN 978-88-12-00032-6.
