= Pietro Assalti =

Pietro Assalti Latinized as Petrus Assaltus (23 June 1680 – 29 April 1728) was an Italian botanist, herbalist, physician, naturalist, professor and writer.

== Biography ==
Assalti was born in Acquaviva Picena. He studied Latin and at the age of fifteen went to Fermo where he acquired a knowledge of Greek, Hebrew, and Arabic. He studied law in Rome and gaining repute as a scholar was chosen by Pope Clement XI and assigned to the Vatican Library. In 1709 he became a professor of botany at the University of Rome, succeeding Giovanni Battista Trionfetti. He became a professor of anatomy in 1719. Assalti compiled, edited, and published the works of Giovanni Maria Lancisi in two volumes in 1718. He annotated Michele Mercati's book on minerals, Metallotheca (1717).
