= Lancisi's sign =

Lancisi's sign is a clinical sign in which a large venous wave, or Giant V wave, is visible in the jugular vein in patients with tricuspid regurgitation. It is caused by blood flowing backwards into the jugular vein through the incompetent tricuspid valve during ventricular systole.

The sign is named after Giovanni Maria Lancisi.

== See also ==
- Jugular venous pressure
