= École Franco-Polonaise =

Private technical university in Poznań, Poland

- Type: Private
- Active: 1993–1997
- Location: Poznań, Greater Poland, Poland

École Franco-Polonaise (EFP), full name École Franco-Polonaise des Nouvelles Technologies d'Information et Telecommunication (Franco-Polish School of New Information and Communication Technologies), was a private technical university, created in Poznań, Poland, in 1993 in cooperation with the city of Rennes and closed in 1997 after the French withdrew from their financial commitment.

EFP was a pioneer graduate school bringing to Poland new concepts of interdisciplinary education with main focus on 4 domains:

- Information Technology,
- Telecommunications,
- Economics
- Foreign Languages (French and English)
