= Giovanni Cosimo Bonomo =

Italian physician

- Born: 30 November 1666; Livorno, Italy
- Died: 13 January 1696 (aged 29); Florence, Italy
- Education: University of Pisa (MD)
- Occupation: medical doctor
- Years active: 1684–1696
- Known for: discovered itch mite origin of scabies
- Medical career
- Sub-specialties: infectious diseases

Giovanni Cosimo Bonomo (30 November 1666 – 13 January 1696) was an Italian physician, known for discovering the itch mite as the cause of the skin disease scabies. He described and drew them after observing their presence with the aid of a microscope in the fluid expressed from lesions of infected patients. By contradicting contemporary medical opinion and the papal aristocracy, he was harshly criticized and had a hard time finding a job. Eventually he became a personal physician for the German Electress Palatine Anna Maria Luisa de' Medici.

== Early life and education ==
Giovanni Cosimo Bonomo was born to French pharmacist Stefano Bonomo and his wife Barbara Boccacci on 30 November 1666. He was born in Livorno, a multicultural city at that time. He studied at the University of Pisa, where he received his doctorate in philosophy and medicine on 22 June 1681. On 18 December 1683, he obtained his license to practice as a freelance physician at the Collegio dei Medici degli Speciali of Florence, the modern-day Università degli Studi di Firenze. His auditors included Francesco Redi, who would become his biggest advocate.

In 1684, Bonomo returned to Livorno where, upon the advice of his father, he began to attend the pharmacy of the famous naturalist and intimate collaborator of Redi, Giacinto Cestoni. Before his father died in the first half of 1684, he recommended Bonomo, who was in poor economic conditions, to Redi, who helped him to get a job as a ship doctor. From 1684 until 1685, Bonomo accompanied a naval expedition against the Turks, during which he observed a variety of diseases and infections, which he succumbed to twice. Thereafter, he began a close collaboration with Cestoni, including the study of scabies. Bonomo observed men extracting small specks out of the skin of those suffering from scabies thereby curing them of their symptoms. Coupled with Cestoni's technical skill in using a microscope, he determined the cause of scabies, which was nothing more than itch mites gnawing in the skin of those afflicted. Bonomo and Cestoni discovered and described "a very minute living creature, in shape resembling a tortoise, of whitish colour, a little dark upon the back, with some thin and long hairs, of nimble motion, with six feet, a sharp head, with two little horns at the end of the snout."

== Career and research ==
On 20 June 1687, Bonomo explained his theory of mite infestation causing scabies in a letter to Redi. Upon his pleading, Redi published Bonomo's letter on 18 July 1687 as Osservazioni intorno a' pellicelli del corpo umano in Florence. Amongst contemporary physician-scientists, his publication achieved no positive resonance. This has mainly been attributed to the negative attitude of the Pope's chief physician Giovanni Maria Lancisi. Bonomo wrote to Lancisi, asking him to render his opinion and urging him to submit the publication to the academicians of the Roman medical congress. On 23 August 1687, Lancisi responded, referring to the discussion among academics and their essentially negative reactions both to his observations of the mite and his definition of scabies as its effect. Bonomo replied, and in turn caused ire and resentment among the papal aristocracy. Lancisi answered with a scholarly list of authorities in his defense and a warning to Bonomo that his publications should not contradict the research of other scholars centuries before him. Bonomo apologized to him with "supreme condolence", renouncing any desire to "contradict".

However, the controversy continued and prompted more complaints by Lancisi. Redi thus intervened with a letter to Cestoni on 14 October 1680. He told Lancisi that he would advise Bonomo not to spread his theories, and recognized that Bonomo was a "little ardent" in his publications. The following day, in a final letter, Bonomo closed the controversy. Lancisi collected all the material, intending to have it printed in a volume which remained a manuscript, with the title of Apologetic Dissertation between ... GC Bonomo and ... GM Lancisi, dedicated to G. Brasavoli. This dissertation is at the Biblioteca Lancisiana in Rome.

Based on his theory of scabies, Bonomo developed a therapy of ointments, douches and baths, in which salts, mercury, sulfur, vitriols and other aggressive and penetrating substances were used. After the publication, Bonomo applied for various posts but had difficulties securing a job despite continued support from Redi. In May 1690, he hired himself as a ship's doctor on the San Stefano, which sailed for Spain.

In March 1691, upon Redi's intervention Bonomo was finally chosen as the personal physician of Anna Maria Luisa de' Medici, who as daughter of Cosimo III de' Medici, Grand Duke of Tuscany had married Johann Wilhelm, Elector Palatine on 29 April 1691 in Florence, and thus become Electress of the Palatinate. Bonomo left for Germany on 6 June 1691, and wrote a diary during the trip, which though it disappeared, Redi called "beautiful". He first accompanied Anna Maria Luisa de' Medici in 1692 to Neuburg an der Donau, Palatinate-Neuburg, and Düsseldorf, the capital of the Duchy of Jülich-Berg, where he was to monitor her pregnancy, which ended in miscarriage. He constantly contacted with Redi, and continued his research and prepared further publications. After he fell ill in Germany, he returned to Florence, where he died on 13 January 1696.

Unlike Cestoni, no known paintings or sketches of Bonomo survive.

== Merit ==
Compared to the traditional medical doctrine which considered scabies to be the result of a humoral dyscrasia, or in the view of iatrochemists, a purging of the corrosive salts contained in the lymph, Bonomo supported the mite origin of scabies. His style of discovery was commanding with lucid reasoning: after examining the problem with Cestoni, they proved that the "bacarelli" or "pellicelli" of scabies were the cause and not its effect; after examining "many needy patients" they investigated the presence and shape of the mites with their "poor and weak microscope", observing them in the skin, how they created their "small streets from one place to another with its eating and gnawing".

Moreover, Bonomo helped refute the hypothesis that considered the mites an effect of mange as spontaneously generated by "corrupt humors". They had witnessed how an "egg" came out of a mite during direct observation under a microscope. According to Bonomo, this proved that these mites were produced via procreation like other animals and insects. Based upon his repeated observations and experiences, Bonomo proved that these organisms caused scabies and their effects on the skin. The pathological manifestations of the skin thus became "consequences" of the corrosive action of the mite, and scabies was therefore recognized as an "external" disease. Moreover, the contagious nature and transmission of the disease, through animals "very apprehensive to apply themselves" and to proliferate, was justified.

After Bonomo's death, his pamphlet was discovered by the English physician Richard Mead, who was passing through Italy and included it as an abstract in the Philosophical Transactions of the Royal Society of London (XXIII [1702–03], No. 283, pp. 129–699). A French translation was found in the Collection Académique, part étr., IV, Paris 1757, pp. 574–81.
