= European Federation of Parasitologists =

The European Federation of Parasitologists (EFP) is a non-profit scientific international organization, founded in November 1966 by Witold Stefański who was its first president. It gathers around 30 national societies of parasitology of European countries. The original bylaws were published in the International Journal for Parasitology in 1979. Hundreds of European scientists are affiliated to the EFP through their national societies. The EFP is a member of the World Federation of Parasitologists. The EFP aims at helping human or animal health authorities in fighting any emerging parasitic problem.

== Aims ==
The main objectives of the European Federation of Parasitologists are to promote the exchange of knowledge on parasitic organisms and diseases, to coordinate researches and networks related to parasitic organisms, to support of basic, veterinary & medical parasitology, to attract young scientists and students to develop researches in Parasitology and to organize a European Multicolloquium of Parasitology (EMOP) every 4 years. The European Federation of Parasitologists is registered in the EU transparency register ( ID: 68170229123-35)

== Colloquiums ==
Eleven European Multicolloqium of Parasitology (EMOP) have been held so far :

1. Rennes, France, 1–4 September 1971
2. Trogyr, Yugoslavia, 1–6 September 1975
3. Cambridge, United Kingdom, 7–13 September 1980
4. İzmir, Turkey, 14–19 October 1984
5. Budapest, Hungary, 4–9 September 1988
6. The Hague, Netherlands, 7–11 September 1992
7. Parma, Italy, 2–6 September 1996
8. Poznań, Poland, 10–14 September 2000
9. Valencia, Spain, 18–23 July 2004
10. Paris, France, 24–28 August 2008
11. Cluj Napoca, Romania, 25–29 July 2012.
12. Turku, Finland, 20–24 July 2016, hosted by Scandinavian-Baltic Society for Parasitology (SBSP).

== Awards and Scholarships ==
The EFP offers, during the EMOP, Young Scientist Awards to stimulate the involvement of young scientists in the development of parasitology in Europe. Awards are in two areas: "Research in Basic Parasitology" and "Research in Applied Parasitology". In addition, to help and stimulate the participation of young parasitologists to the EMOP, the board of the European Federation of Parasitologists grants scholarships to cover the registration fees.
