= Effective fragment potential method =

Computational chemistry method

The effective fragment potential (EFP) method is a computational approach designed to describe intermolecular interactions and environmental effects. It is a computationally inexpensive means to describe interactions in non-bonded systems. It was originally formulated to describe the solvent effects in complex chemical systems. But it has undergone vast improvements in the past two decades, and is currently used to represent intermolecular interactions (represented as rigid fragments), and in molecular dynamics (MD) simulations as well.
