= Thomas Bates (surgeon) =

English doctor

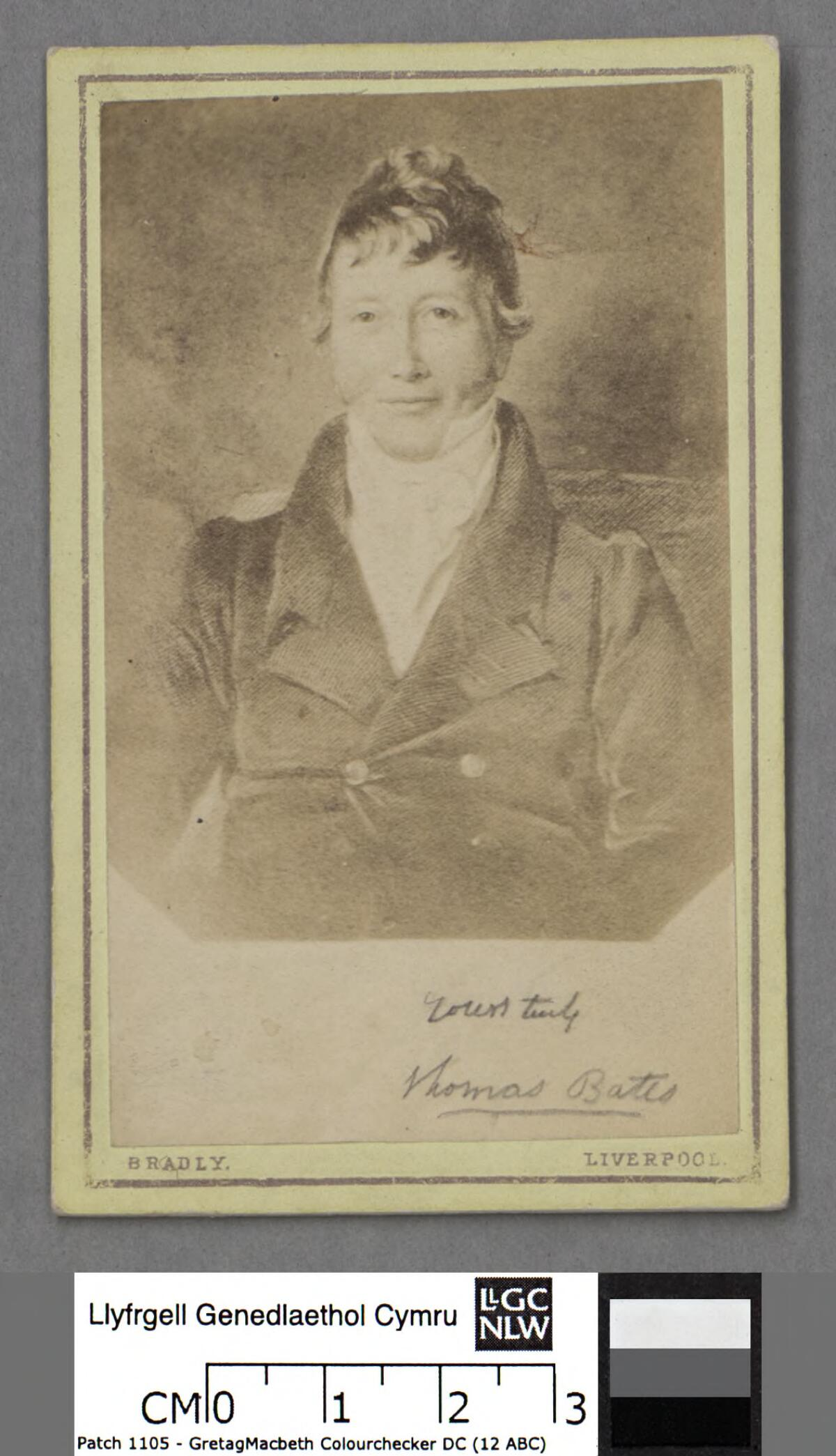
- Portrait of Thomas Bates.
- Born: Thomas Bates; England
- Died: England
- Occupation: Surgeon
- Known for: Naval surgeon

Thomas Bates, FRS (fl. 1704–1719) was a naval surgeon in the Royal Navy.

== Career ==
Bates is known from his Enchiridion of Fevers common to Seamen in the Mediterranean, published in London in 1709. He served for five years as a naval surgeon in the Mediterranean, and subsequently he practiced in London. He was a surgeon to the Royal Household.

He also distinguished himself by his efforts during the cattle plague of 1714. This epidemic, which is said to have destroyed a million and a half of cattle in western Europe in 1711–14, had made its appearance in England, where it had been unknown for centuries, and had reached the Islington cowyards. The energetic measures adopted by the Privy Council on Bates's suggestions proved so effectual that, at a sacrifice of six thousand head of cattle, it was stamped out within three months.

== Royal Society ==
Bates was elected a Fellow of the Royal Society in December 1718, and was admitted into the society 8 January 1719.
