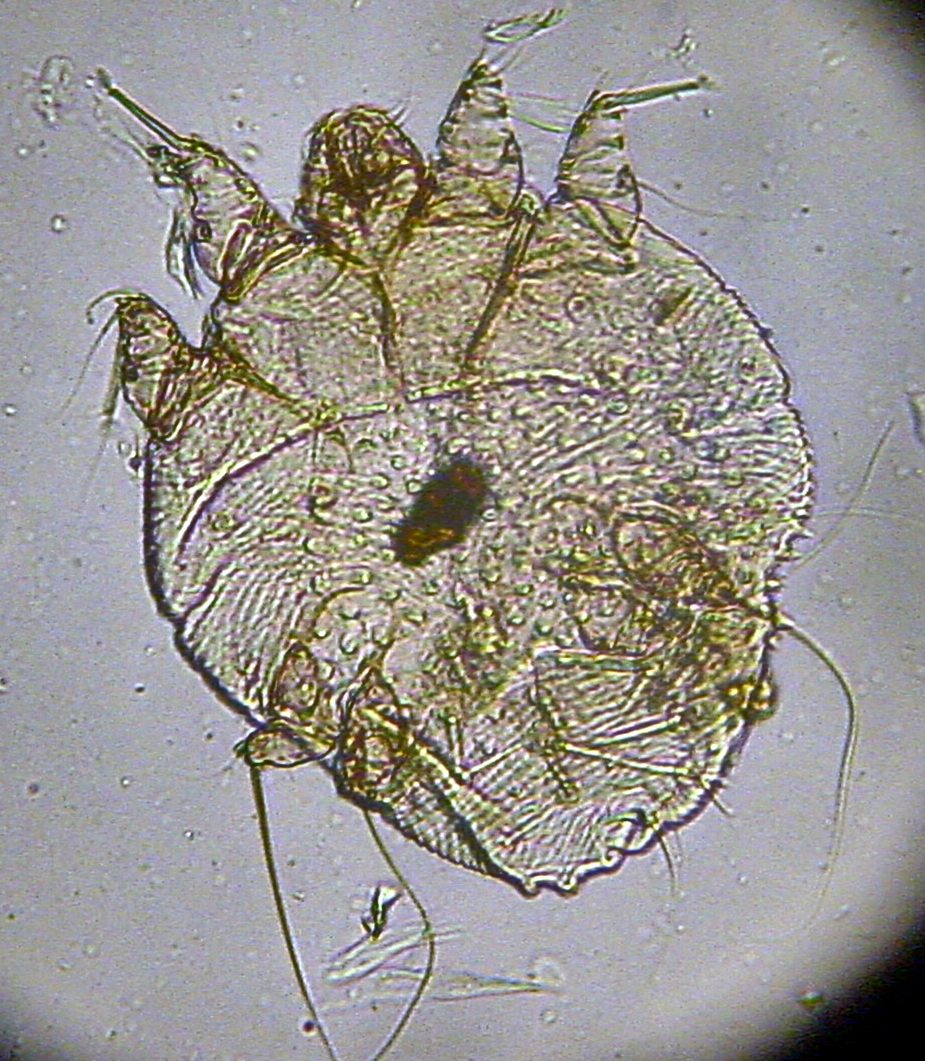

Scientific classification
- Kingdom: Animalia
- Phylum: Arthropoda
- Subphylum: Chelicerata
- Class: Arachnida
- Order: Sarcoptiformes
- Family: Sarcoptidae
- Genus: Sarcoptes
- Species: S. scabiei

Binomial name
- Sarcoptes scabiei (Linnaeus, 1758)

= Sarcoptes scabiei =

Species of mite

Sarcoptes scabiei (/sɑːrˈkɒptiːz ˈskeɪbiːaɪ/; sar-KOP-teez SKAY-bee-eye) or the itch mite is a parasitic mite found in all parts of the world that burrows into skin and causes scabies. Humans become infested by Sarcoptes scabiei var. hominis, which is a particular public health problem in crowded settings such as care homes, schools, refugee camps, prisons, and hospitals. Other mammals can be infested with different varieties of the mite, including wild and domesticated dogs and cats (in which it is one cause of mange), ungulates, wild boars, bovids, wombats, koalas, and great apes.

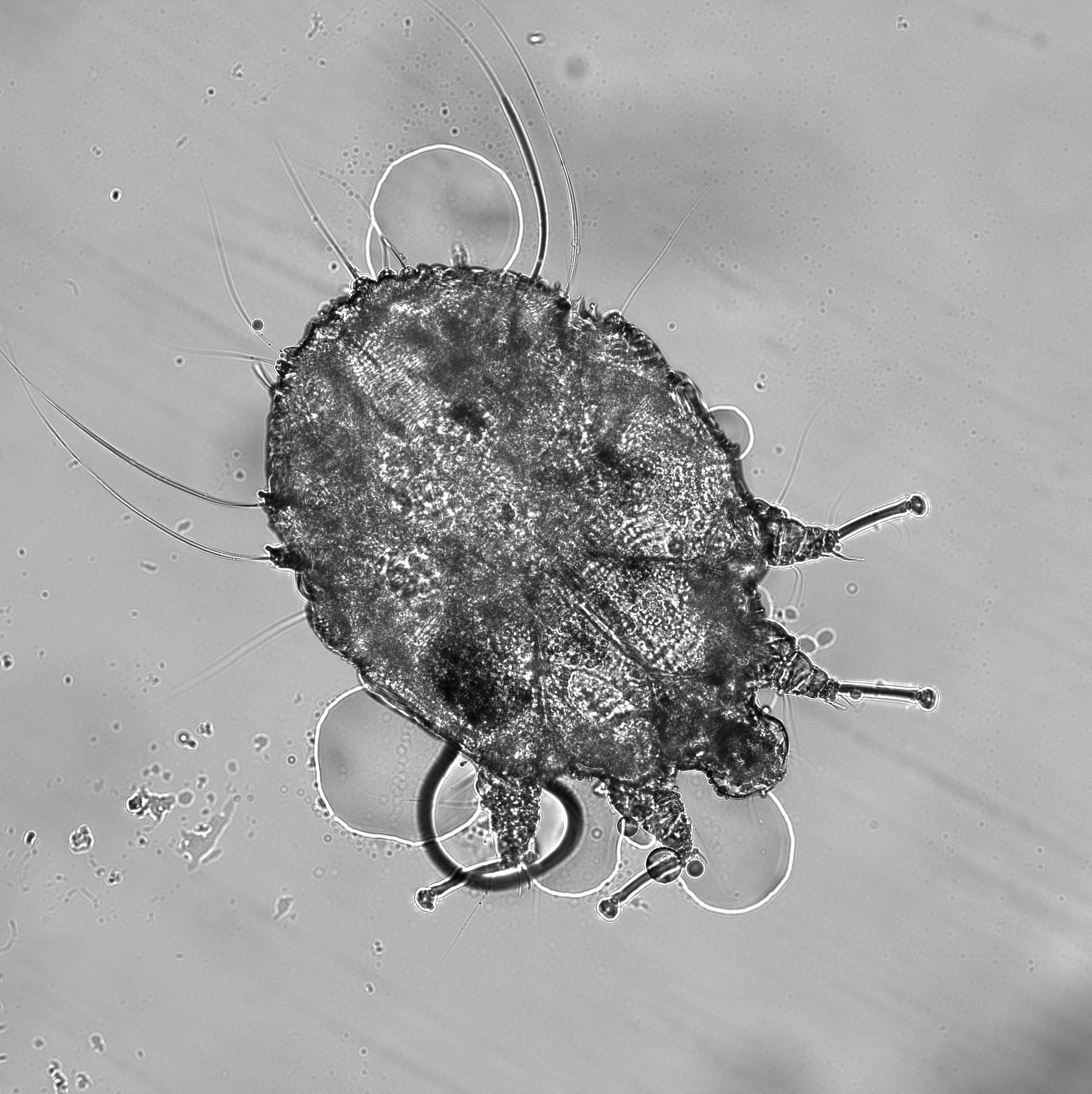
Human scabies mite seen under an optical microscope (x20)

The Italian biologists Giovanni Cosimo Bonomo and Diacinto Cestoni showed in the 17th century that scabies is caused by Sarcoptes scabiei; this discovery of the itch mite in 1687 marked scabies as the first disease of humans with a known microscopic causative agent. The disease produces intense, itchy skin rashes when the impregnated female tunnels into the stratum corneum of the skin and deposits eggs in the burrow. The larvae, which hatch in three to 10 days, move about on the skin, moult into a nymphal stage, and then mature into adult mites. The adult mites live three to four weeks in the host's skin.

== Clinical significance ==
The action of the mites moving within the skin and on the skin itself produces an intense itch that may resemble other types of allergic reaction in appearance. A delayed Type IV hypersensitivity reaction to the mites, their eggs, or scybala (packets of feces) occurs approximately 30 days after infestation. The presence of the eggs produces a massive allergic response that, in turn, produces more itching. Individuals who already are sensitized from a prior infestation can develop symptoms within hours.

Sarcoptes is a genus of skin parasites, and part of the larger family of mites collectively known as "scab mites". They are also related to the scab mite Psoroptes, also a mite that infests the skin of domestic animals. Sarcoptic mange affects domestic animals and similar infestations in domestic fowls cause the disease known as "scaly leg". The effects of S. scabiei are the most well-known, causing "scabies", or "the itch". The adult female mite, having been fertilized, burrows into the skin (usually at the hands or wrists, but other parts of the body may also be affected), and lays its eggs.

The burrowing is carried out using the mouth parts and special cutting surfaces on the front legs. While these are being used, the mite anchors itself with suckers on its feet. Eggs are laid in small numbers as the mite burrows, and, as these hatch, six-legged larvae climb out on to the skin and search for hair follicles, where they feed and moult (discard old cuticles to grow). In the hair follicles, the larvae show the first nymphal stages, with eight legs.

In the nymphal stages, the creature feeds and moults, and if male, gives rise to the adult. In the case of females, another moult occurs before adulthood. The female has more moults than a male, so takes longer—17 days compared to 9 to 11 days for a male—to reach adulthood. The female is about twice the size of the male.

Although the life-cycle is only about two weeks, individual patients are seldom found to have more than about a dozen mites on them. Even so, this number can cause agonising itching, especially at night, and severe damage to the skin often comes as a result of scratching, in particular by the introduction of infective bacteria, which may lead to impetigo or eczema.

Video of the S. scabiei mite

Video of the S. scabiei mite

The eggs are laid by the female at a rate of about two to three eggs a day for about two months. About 2% of the British population is thought to be infested with these mites, which take about 25 minutes to an hour to burrow into the skin.

The best conditions in which to harbor S. scabiei is in areas with frequent skin-to-skin contact, such as the hands and wrists, as the mites are transmitted by skin contact with carriers, and they very easily spread. Infestations of S. scabiei are commonly found in pigs. They significantly depress growth and feeding rate, but usually die out in around five days in typical farm conditions. However, once in a herd, the mites are very difficult to eliminate without great measures taken.

== Morphology ==
Adult scabies mites are round, eyeless mites with four pairs of legs (two pairs in front and two pairs behind). They are recognizable by their oval, ventrally flattened and dorsally convex tortoise-like bodies and multiple cuticular spines. No demarcation into cephalothorax or abdomen occurs, and the mite's surface has folds covered with short bristles. The front legs end in long, tubular processes known as suckers, and the hind legs end in long bristles. The male has suckers on all legs except the third pair, which distinguishes it from the female. Females are 0.3–0.45 mm (0.012–0.018 in) long and 0.25–0.35 mm (0.0098–0.0138 in) wide, and males are just over half that size.

== Life cycle ==
The scabies mite Sarcoptes scabiei var. hominis goes through four stages in its lifecycle: egg, larva, nymph, and adult.

Upon infesting a human host, the adult female burrows into the stratum corneum (outermost layer of skin), where she deposits two or three eggs per day. These oval eggs are 0.1–0.15 mm (0.0039–0.0059 in) long and hatch as larvae in three to four days. A female can lay up to 30 eggs, then dies at the end of a burrow. Upon hatching, the six-legged larvae migrate to the skin surface and then burrow into molting pouches, usually into hair follicles, where vesicles form (these are shorter and smaller than the adult burrows). After three to four days, the larvae molt, turning into eight-legged nymphs. This form molts a second time into slightly larger nymphs, before a final molt into adult mites. Adult mites then mate when the male penetrates the molting pouch of the female. Mating occurs only once, as that one event leaves the female fertile for the rest of her life (one to two months). The impregnated female then leaves the molting pouch in search of a suitable location for a permanent burrow. Once a site is found, the female creates her characteristic S-shaped burrow, laying eggs in the process. The female will continue lengthening her burrow and laying eggs for the duration of her life.

== See also ==
- Fly strike in sheep
- List of mites associated with cutaneous reactions
- List of parasites of humans
