= Scabies =

Human disease

- Other names: Seven-year itch
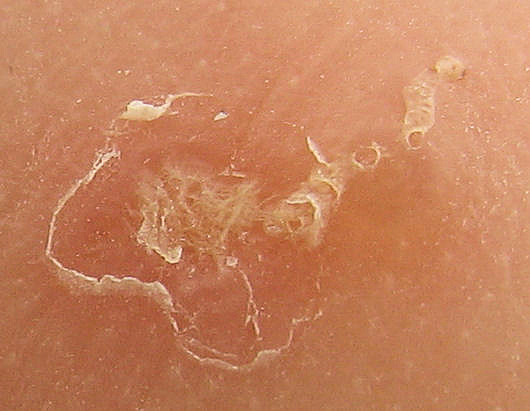
- Magnified view of a burrowing trail of the scabies mite. The scaly patch on the left was caused by scratching and marks the mite's entry point into the skin. The mite has burrowed to the top-right, where it can be seen as a dark spot at the end.
- Specialty: Infectious disease, dermatology
- Symptoms: itchiness, pimple-like rash
- Usual onset: 2–6 weeks (first infection), ~1 day (subsequent infections)
- Causes: Sarcoptes scabiei mite spread by close contact
- Risk factors: Crowded living conditions (child care facilities, group homes, prisons), lack of access to water, wearing second hand clothing
- Diagnostic method: Based on symptoms
- Differential diagnosis: seborrheic dermatitis, dermatitis herpetiformis, pediculosis, atopic dermatitis
- Medication: permethrin, crotamiton, lindane, ivermectin
- Frequency: 204 million / 2.8% (2015)

Scabies (/ˈskeɪbiːz/, SKAY-beez; also sometimes known as the seven-year itch) is a contagious human skin infestation by the tiny (0.2–0.45 mm) mite Sarcoptes scabiei, variety hominis. The word is from Latin: scabere, lit. 'to scratch'. It is a particular public health problem in crowded settings such as care homes, schools, refugee camps, prisons, and hospitals. The most common symptoms are severe itchiness and a pimple-like rash. Occasionally, tiny burrows may appear on the skin from eggs that are about to hatch. In a first-ever infection, the infected person usually develops symptoms within three weeks. During a second infection, symptoms may begin within 24 hours. These symptoms can be present across most of the body or just in certain areas such as the wrists, between fingers, or along the waistline. The head may be affected, but this is typically only in young children. The itch is often worse at night. Scratching may cause skin breakdown and an additional bacterial infection in the skin.

Various names have been given to this condition and the name "seven year itch" has been recorded in many documents from the 1800s, though the 1952 play The Seven Year Itch and modern treatment methods have generally obsoleted this name, which now refers to a phenomenon in human relationships.

Scabies was historically very difficult to treat. It is caused by infection with the female mite Sarcoptes scabiei var. hominis, an ectoparasite. The mites burrow into the skin to live and deposit eggs. The symptoms of scabies are due to an allergic reaction to the mites. Often, only between 10 and 15 mites are involved in an infection. Scabies most often spreads during a relatively long period of direct skin contact with an infected person (at least 10 minutes) such as that which may occur during sexual activity or living together. Spread of the disease may occur even if the person has not developed symptoms yet. Crowded living conditions, such as those found in child-care facilities, group homes, and prisons, increase the risk of spread. Areas with a lack of access to water also have higher disease rates. Crusted scabies is a more severe form of the disease, not essentially different but an infestation by huge numbers of mites that typically only affects those with a poor immune system; the number of mites also makes them much more contagious. In these cases, the spread of infection may occur during brief contact or by contaminated objects. The mite is tiny and at the limit of detection with the human eye. It is not readily obvious; factors that aid in detection are good lighting, magnification, and knowing what to look for. Diagnosis is based either on detecting the mite (confirmed scabies), detecting typical lesions in a typical distribution with typical histological features (clinical scabies), or detecting atypical lesions or atypical distribution of lesions with only some histological features present (suspected scabies).

Several medications are available to treat those infected, including oral and topical ivermectin, permethrin, crotamiton, and lindane creams. Sexual contacts within the last month and people who live in the same house should also be treated at the same time. Bedding and clothing used in the last three days should be washed in hot water and dried in a hot dryer. As the mite does not live for more than three days away from human skin, more washing is not needed. Symptoms may continue for two to four weeks following treatment. If after this time symptoms continue, retreatment may be needed.

Scabies is one of the three most common skin disorders in children, along with ringworm and bacterial skin infections. As of 2015, it affects about 204 million people (2.8% of the world population). It is equally common in both sexes. The young and the old are more commonly affected. It also occurs more commonly in the developing world and tropical climates. Other animals do not spread human scabies; similar infection in other animals is known as sarcoptic mange, and is typically caused by slightly different but related mites.

== Signs and symptoms ==
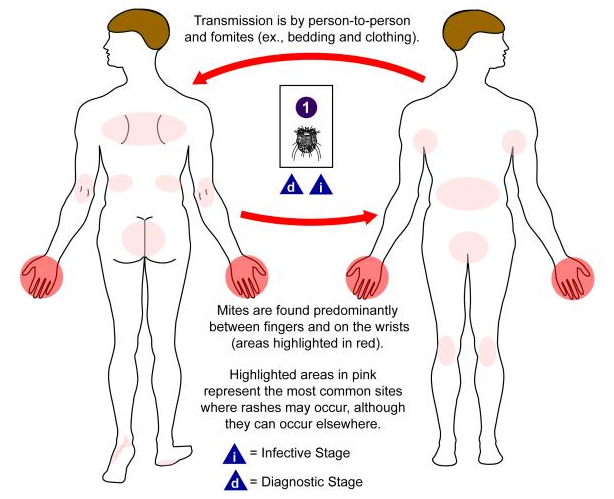
Commonly involved sites of rashes of scabies

The characteristic symptoms of a scabies infection include intense itching and superficial burrows. Because the host develops the symptoms as a reaction to the mites' presence over time, typically a delay of four to six weeks occurs between the onset of infestation and the onset of itching. Similarly, symptoms often persist for one to several weeks after successful eradication of the mites. As noted, those re-exposed to scabies after successful treatment may exhibit symptoms of the new infestation in a much shorter period—as little as one to four days.

=== Itching ===
In the classic scenario, the itch is made worse by warmth and is usually experienced as being worse at night, possibly because distractions are fewer. As a symptom, it is less common in the elderly.

=== Rash ===
The superficial burrows of scabies usually occur in the area of the finger webs, feet, ventral wrists, elbows, back, buttocks, and external genitals. Except in infants and the immunosuppressed, infection generally does not occur in the skin of the face or scalp. The burrows are created by the excavation of the adult mite in the epidermis. Acropustulosis, or blisters and pustules on the palms and soles of the feet, are characteristic symptoms of scabies in infants.

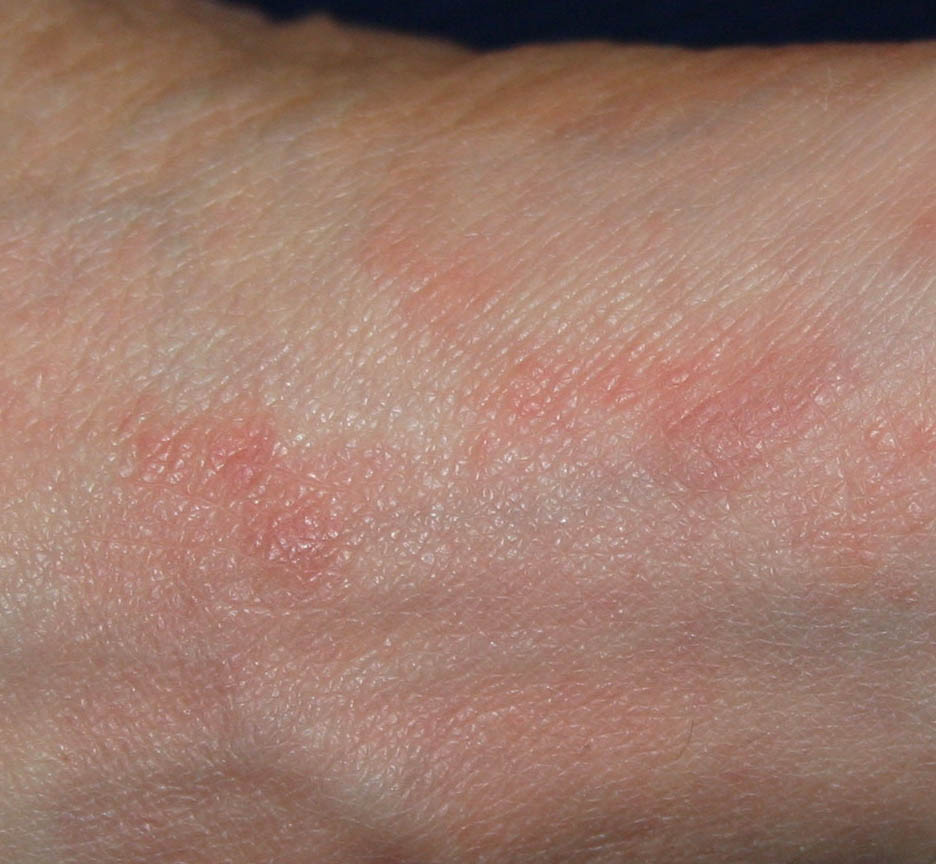
Scabies of the foot

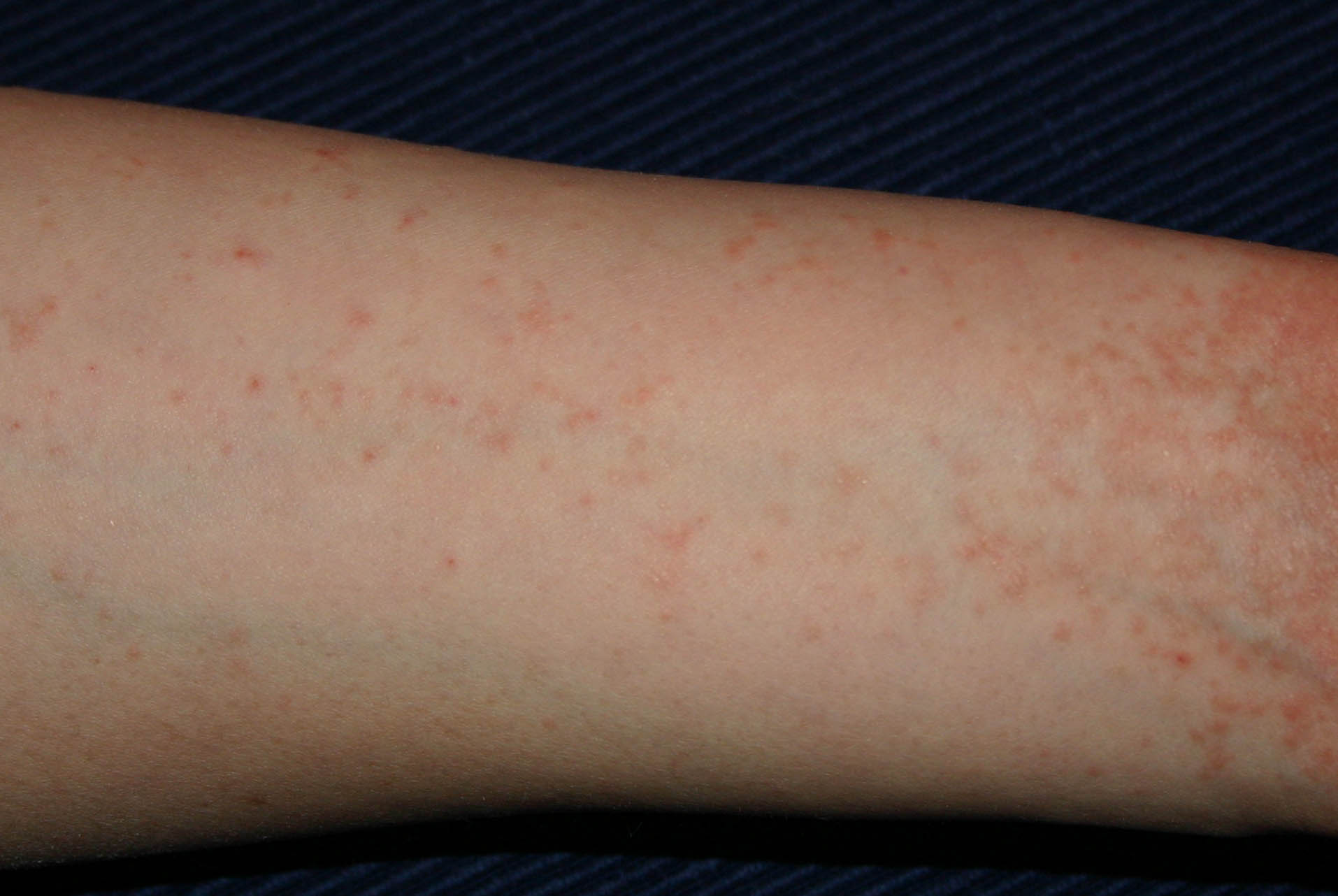
Scabies of the arm

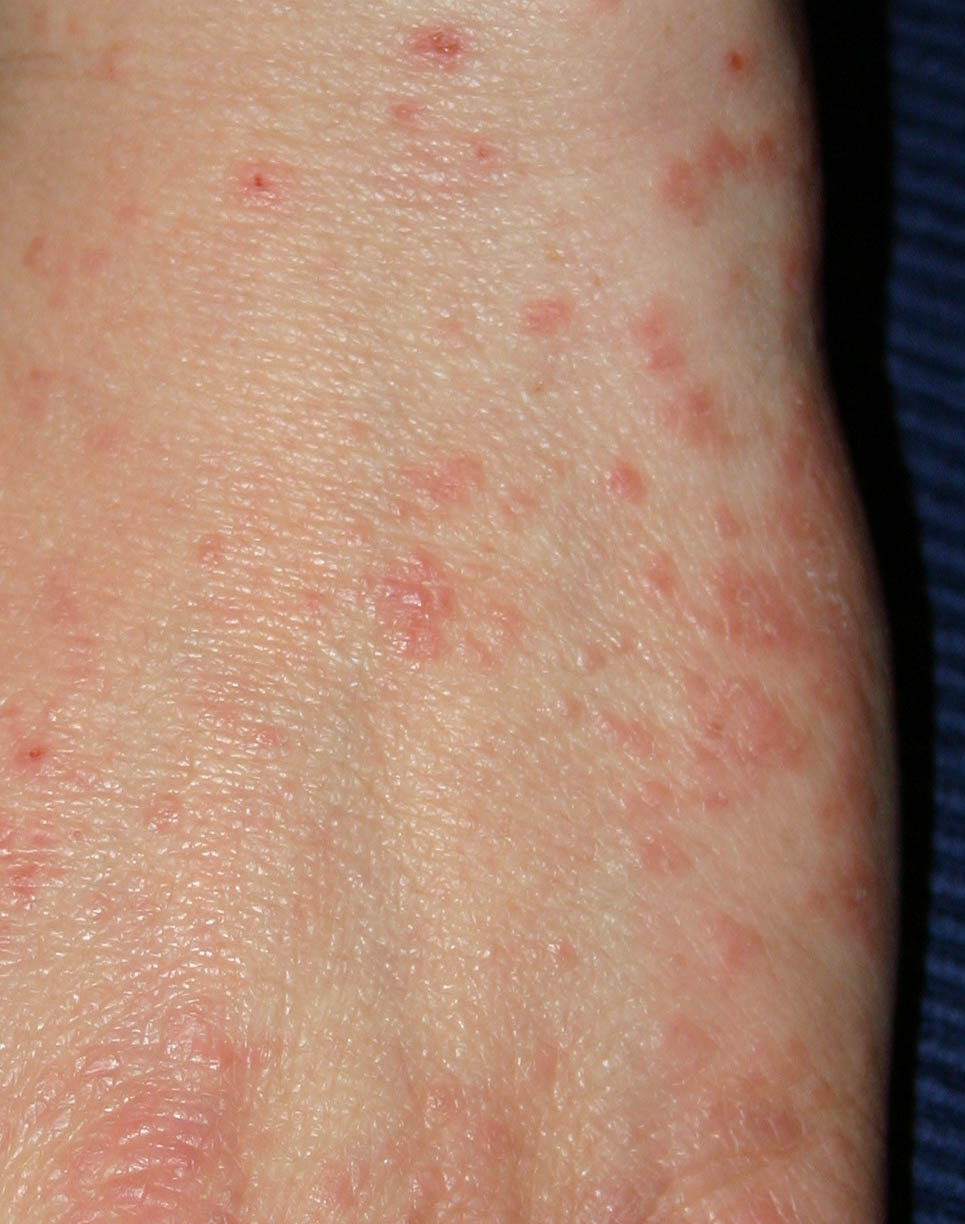
Scabies of the hand

In most people, the trails of the burrowing mites are linear or S-shaped tracks in the skin, often accompanied by rows of small, pimple-like mosquito or insect bites. Lesions are symmetrical and mainly affect the hands, wrists, axillae, thighs, buttocks, waist, soles of the feet, areola, and vulva in females, and penis and scrotum in males. The neck and above are usually not affected, except in cases of crusted scabies and infestations of infants, the elderly, and the immunocompromised. Symptoms typically appear two to six weeks after infestation for individuals never before exposed to scabies. For those having been previously exposed, the symptoms can appear within several days after infestation. However, symptoms may appear after several months or years.

=== Crusted scabies ===
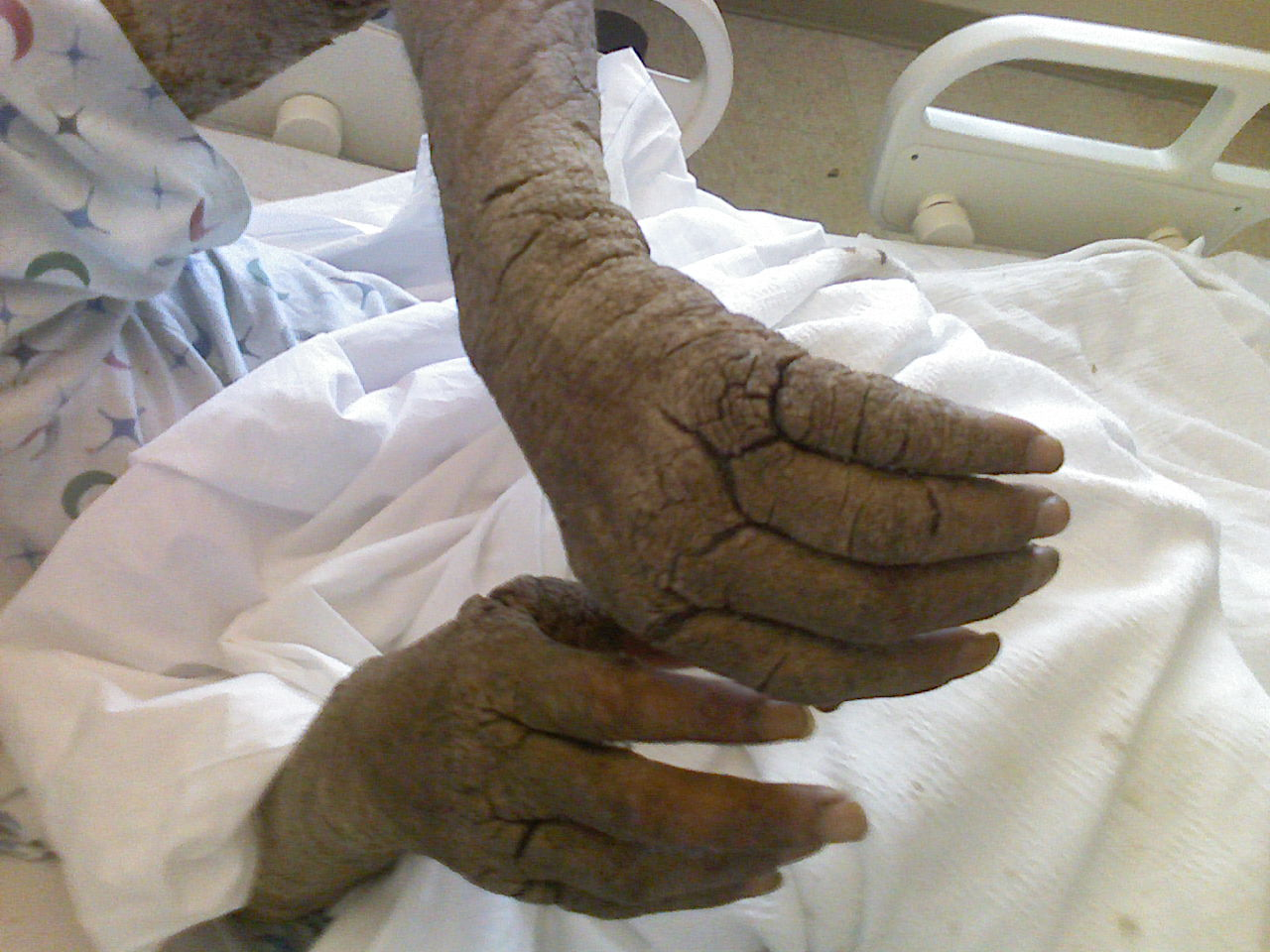
Crusted scabies in a person with AIDS

The elderly, disabled, and people with impaired immune systems, such as those with HIV/AIDS, cancer, or those on immunosuppressive medications, are susceptible to crusted scabies (also called Norwegian scabies). On those with weaker immune systems, the host becomes a more fertile breeding ground for the mites, which spread over the host's body, except the face. The mites in crusted scabies are not more virulent than in noncrusted scabies but are much more numerous, sometimes up to two million. People with crusted scabies exhibit scaly rashes, slight itching, and thick crusts of skin that contain large numbers of scabies mites. For this reason, persons with crusted scabies are more contagious to others than those with typical scabies. Such areas make eradication of mites particularly difficult, as the crusts protect the mites from topical miticides/scabicides, necessitating prolonged treatment of these areas.

=== Nodular scabies ===
In 5-10% of cases, alongside the burrows, rash, and possible pustules, scabies creates raised, hard, and itchy oblong nodules on the skin, 1-4cm across. They may appear purple, dark brown, or pale in patients with darker skin tones, they are pink or red on paler skin tones. These nodules are likely a result of a localized hypersensitivity of the immune system to mites, their waste, or both. Because of this, nodular scabies may be more likely in people with chronic infections, failed treatments, or people becoming re-infected, as the immune system has had time to become sensitized. These nodules are more common on scrotal skin, vulva skin, thighs, buttocks and around the underarms. As with more common presentations of scabies, it is especially present near where skin regularly touches other skin. Once the nodules develop, it can take months for them to heal, even after successful treatment. Some details about the disease are still being researched but it is known to be more common in children and may be more common in males.

== Cause ==
=== Scabies mite ===
Video of the Sarcoptes scabiei mite

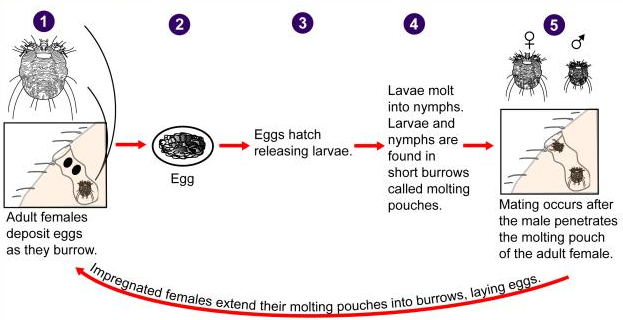
Lifecycle of scabies

In the 18th century, Italian biologists Giovanni Cosimo Bonomo and Diacinto Cestoni (1637–1718) described the mite now called Sarcoptes scabiei, variety hominis, as the cause of scabies. Sarcoptes is a genus of skin parasites and part of the larger family of mites collectively known as scab mites. These organisms have eight legs as adults and are placed in the same phylogenetic class (Arachnida) as spiders and ticks.

S. scabiei mites are under 0.5 mm in size; they are sometimes visible as pinpoints of white. Gravid females tunnel into the dead, outermost layer (stratum corneum) of a host's skin and deposit eggs in the shallow burrows. The eggs hatch into larvae in three to ten days. These young mites move about on the skin and molt into a "nymphal" stage, before maturing as adults, which live three to four weeks in the host's skin. Males roam on top of the skin, occasionally burrowing into the skin. In general, the total number of adult mites infesting a healthy hygienic person with non-crusted scabies is small, about 11 females in burrows, on average.

The movement of mites within and on the skin produces an intense itch, which has the characteristics of a delayed cell-mediated inflammatory response to allergens. IgE antibodies are present in the serum and the site of infection, which react to multiple protein allergens in the body of the mite. Some of these cross-react to allergens from house dust mites. Immediate antibody-mediated allergic reactions (wheals) have been elicited in infected persons, but not in those not infected; immediate hypersensitivity of this type is thought to explain the observed far more rapid allergic skin response to reinfection seen in persons who have been infected previously, especially within the previous year or two.

=== Transmission ===
Scabies is contagious and can be contracted through prolonged physical contact with an infested person. This includes sexual intercourse, although a majority of cases are acquired through other forms of skin-to-skin contact. Less commonly, scabies infestation can happen through the sharing of clothes, towels, and bedding, but this is not a major mode of transmission; individual mites can survive for only two to three days, at most, away from human skin at room temperature. As with lice, a latex condom is ineffective against scabies transmission during intercourse, because mites typically migrate from one individual to the next at sites other than the sex organs.

Multiple transmission factors allow scabies to achieve very high prevalence rates in institutional outbreaks, including crowded living conditions with high host density, social interactions involving prolonged skin-to-skin contact, sharing of bedding and clothing, frequent manual handling, limited access to laundry services, and immunocompromised populations. Healthcare workers are at risk of contracting scabies from patients, because they may be in extended contact with them.

== Pathophysiology ==
The symptoms are caused by an allergic reaction of the host's body to mite proteins, though exactly which proteins remains a topic of study. The mite proteins are also present in the gut, and in mite feces, which are deposited under the skin. The allergic reaction is both of the delayed (cell-mediated) and immediate (antibody-mediated) type, and involves IgE (antibodies are presumed to mediate the very rapid symptoms on reinfection). The allergy-type symptoms (itching) continue for some days, and even several weeks, after all mites are killed. New lesions may appear for a few days after mites are eradicated. Nodular lesions from scabies may continue to be symptomatic for weeks after the mites have been killed.

Rates of scabies are negatively related to temperature and positively related to humidity.

== Diagnosis ==
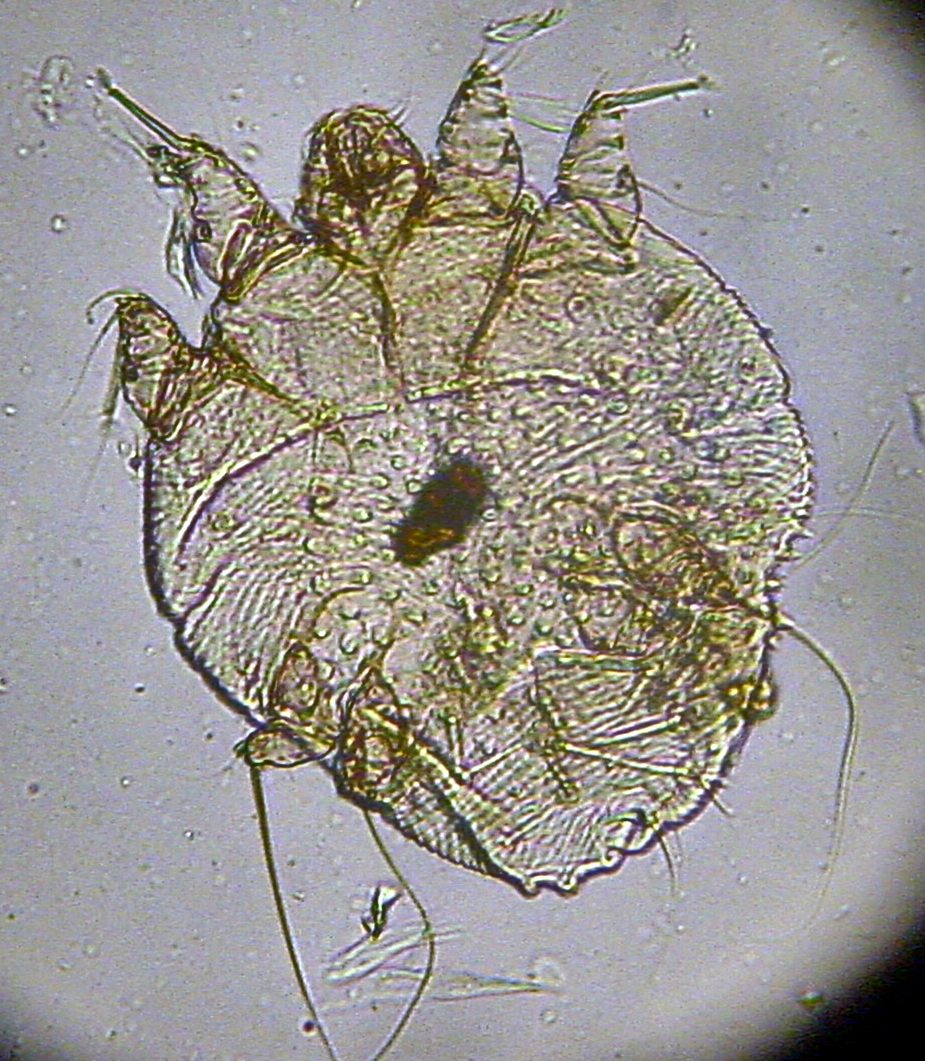
A photomicrograph of an itch mite (S. scabiei)

Scabies may be diagnosed clinically in geographical areas where it is common when diffuse itching presents along with either a lesion in two typical spots or itchiness is present in another household member. The classical sign of scabies is the burrow made by a mite within the skin. In one technique to make burrows easier to find, the suspected area is rubbed with ink from a fountain pen or a topical tetracycline solution, which glows under a special light. The skin is then wiped with an alcohol pad. If the person is infected with scabies, the characteristic zigzag or S pattern of the burrow will appear across the skin; however, interpreting this test may be difficult, as the burrows are scarce and may be obscured by scratch marks. A definitive diagnosis is made by finding either the scabies mites or their eggs and fecal pellets. Searches for these signs involve either scraping a suspected area, mounting the sample in potassium hydroxide and examining it under a microscope, or using dermoscopy to examine the skin directly.

=== Differential diagnosis ===
Symptoms of early scabies infestation mirror other skin diseases, including dermatitis, syphilis, erythema multiforme, various urticaria-related syndromes, allergic reactions, ringworm-related diseases, and other ectoparasites such as lice and fleas.

== Prevention of passing on scabies to other people ==
Mass-treatment programs that use topical permethrin or oral ivermectin have been effective in reducing the prevalence of scabies in several populations. The simultaneous treatment of all close contacts is recommended, even if they show no symptoms of infection (asymptomatic), to reduce rates of recurrence. Since mites can survive for only two to three days without a host, other objects in the environment pose little risk of transmission except in the case of crusted scabies. Therefore, cleaning is of little importance. Rooms used by those with crusted scabies require thorough cleaning.

== Management ==
=== Treatment ===
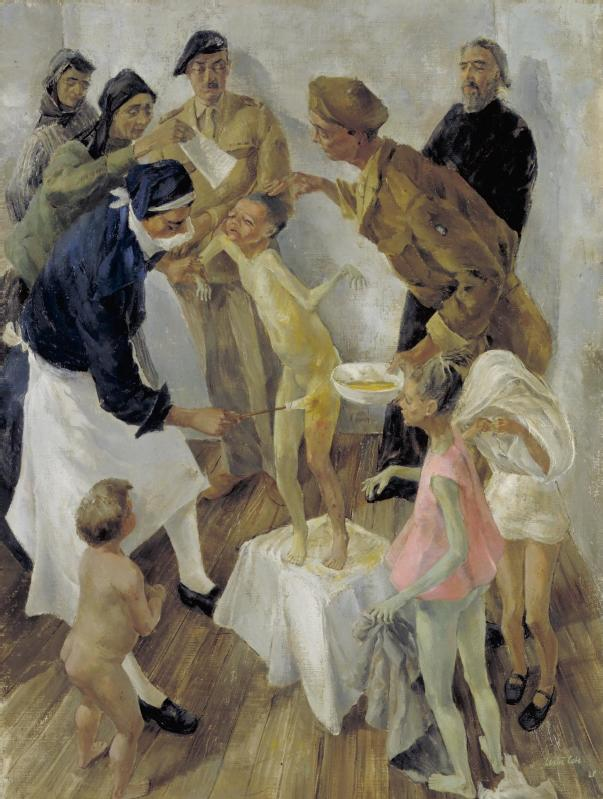
A child being treated for scabies

Several medications are effective in treating scabies, and on a population-wide basis also reduce hospital and primary care presentations for secondary bacterial infections which can follow scabies. Treatment should involve the entire household and any others who have had recent, prolonged contact with the infested individual. In addition to treating the infestation, options to control itchiness include antihistamines and prescription anti-inflammatory agents. Bedding, clothing and towels used during the previous three days should be washed in hot water and dried in a hot dryer.

Treatment protocols for crusted scabies are significantly more intense than for common scabies.

=== Permethrin ===
Permethrin, a pyrethroid insecticide, is the most effective treatment for scabies, and remains the treatment of choice. It is applied from the neck down, usually before sleep, and left on for about 8 to 14 hours, then washed off in the morning. Care should be taken to coat the entire skin surface, not just symptomatic areas; any patch of skin left untreated can provide a "safe haven" for one or more mites to survive. One application is normally sufficient, as permethrin kills eggs, hatchlings, and adult mites, though many physicians recommend a second application three to seven days later as a precaution. Crusted scabies may require multiple applications or supplemental treatment with oral ivermectin (below). Permethrin may cause slight irritation of the skin that is usually tolerable.

As with other pyrethroids, the mechanism of action is excitotoxic paralysis, disrupting the nervous system and movement of mites. The mites become unable to breathe, eat, or mate either while under the effects of the excitotoxin, or as a result of damage to their nerves sustained by the exposure. While pyrethroids also affect mammals including humans, the chemicals are vastly more effective on insects, allowing safe doses to be useful at eradicating mites causing infestations.

In recent years, concern has grown regarding the development of permethrin-resistant scabies. 2022 studies performed in Kuşadası, Turkey showed in cases where patients failed to improve with 5% permethrin, 100% of scabies mites analyzed were sensitive to in-vitro 5% permethrin, suggesting that lack of efficacy could be due to treatment non-compliance rather than true resistance. However, a 2024 study published in Salzburg, Austria revealed permethrin resistant-scabies in nearly 3 out of 4 cases studied. In this population, treatment with benzyl benzoate had a considerably higher cure rate. Additional studies will be needed to confirm the presence of permethrin-resistance and to determine its epidemiology.

=== Ivermectin ===
Oral ivermectin is effective in eradicating scabies, often in a single dose. It is the treatment of choice for crusted scabies, and is sometimes prescribed in combination with a topical agent. It has not been tested on infants, and is not recommended for children under six years of age.

Topical ivermectin preparations are effective for scabies in adults. It has also been useful for sarcoptic mange, the veterinary analog of human scabies.

One review found that the efficacy of permethrin is similar to that of systemic or topical ivermectin. A separate review found that although oral ivermectin is usually effective for the treatment of scabies, it does have a higher treatment failure rate than topical permethrin. Another review found that oral ivermectin provided a reasonable balance between efficacy and safety. A study has demonstrated that scabies is markedly reduced in populations taking ivermectin regularly; the drug is widely used for treating scabies and other parasitic diseases, particularly among the poor and disadvantaged in the tropics, beginning with the developer Merck providing the drug at no cost to treat onchocerciasis from 1987.

The mechanism of action is excitotoxic, causing paralysis of the muscles of the mites and possibly damage to their nervous system. Ivermectin has a half-life in the body of 12-36 hours. When taken orally, the medication is absorbed through the intestines and delivered to the skin. This delivery primarily occurs through the sebaceous glands, causing patients to secrete miticidal sebum (skin oil). Ivermectin is seen as ineffective against mite eggs, usually necessitating at least two doses spaced roughly a week apart to kill newly hatched mites.

=== Other medicines ===
Other treatments include lindane, benzyl benzoate, crotamiton, malathion, and sulfur preparations. Lindane is effective, but concerns over potential neurotoxicity have limited its availability in many countries. It is banned in California, but may be used in other states as a second-line treatment. Sulfur ointments or benzyl benzoate are often used in the developing world due to their low cost; some 10% sulfur solutions have been shown to be effective, and sulfur ointments are typically used for at least a week, though many people find the odor of sulfur products unpleasant. Crotamiton has been found to be less effective than permethrin in limited studies. Crotamiton or sulfur preparations are sometimes recommended instead of permethrin for children, due to concerns over dermal absorption of permethrin.

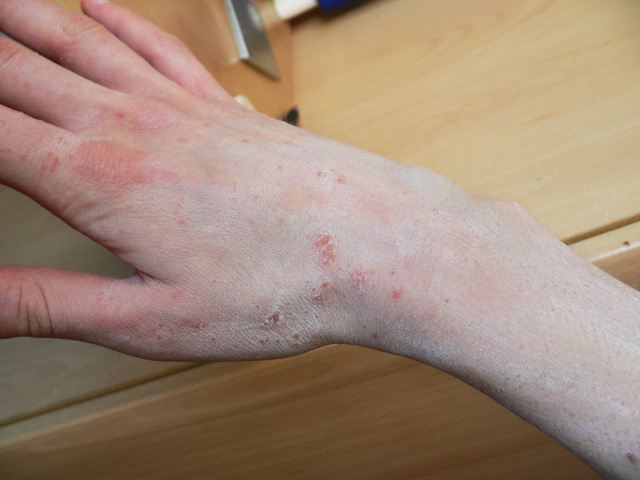
Day 4

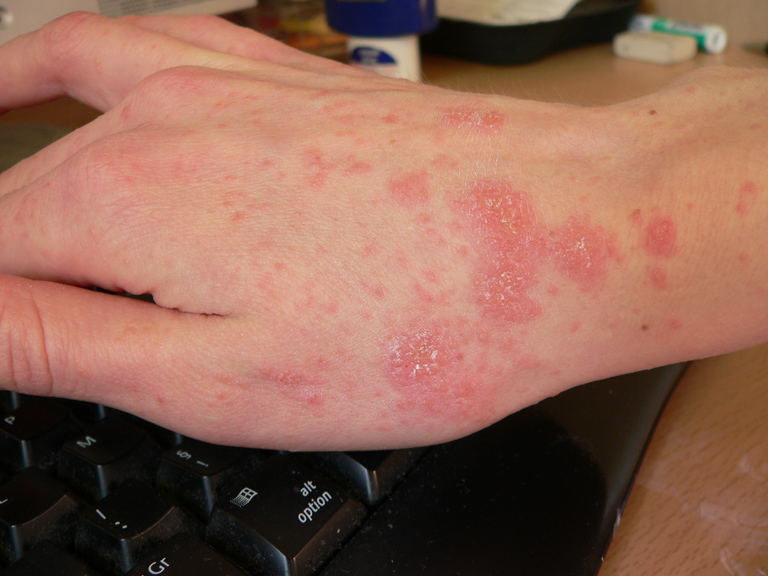
Day 8 (treatment begins)

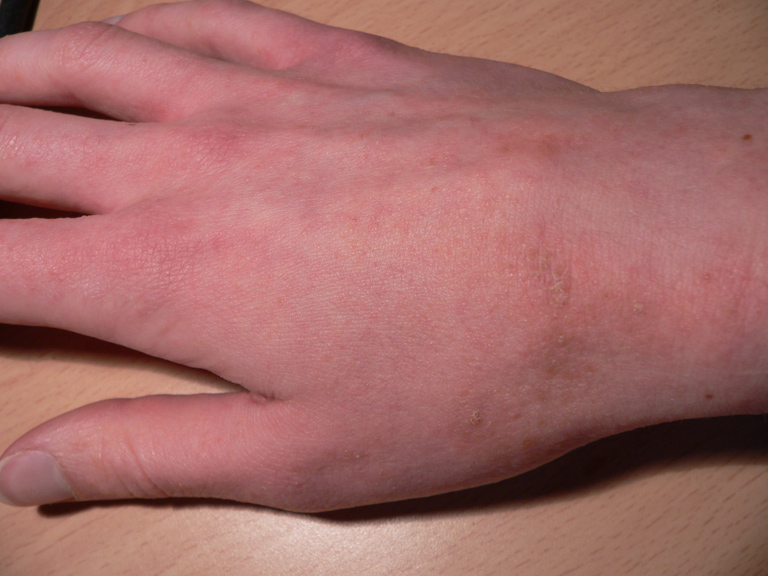
Day 12 (under treatment)

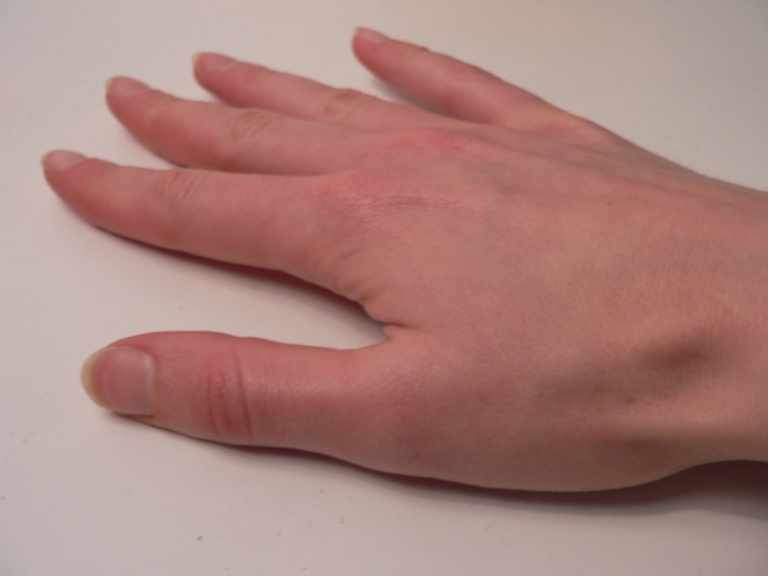
Healed

=== Herbal Medicine ===
There are medicinal herbs that kill or interrupt the lifecycle of scabies mites both in the lab and when topically applied to living people. Despite this, curing the condition solely with herbal medicine is difficult and often not recommended, even by advocates of herbal medicine. There are multiple natural chemicals that are insecticides (bug killing), acaricides (tick and mite killing), miticides (mite killing), and/or scabicides (Scabies mite killing). Many herbal recipes exist to fight mite-caused diseases including the highly-related sarcoptic mange in other animals but they may claim only to treat symptoms, lessen severity, or prevent new infections. Interest in herbal and hybrid treatments is partially driven by concerns about drug-resistance. Herbs with documented scabicidal effects include tulsi, thyme, majoram, clove, chrysanthemum, camphor tree, geranium, tea tree, rosemary, oregano, neem, and coconut. Sometimes the active chemicals are known and their minimum inhibitory concentrations are measured. Some isolated naturally-occurring chemicals known to kill scabies mites in vitro are benzyl benzoate, geraniol, lemonene, and neral. Herbal medicines that kill mites in lab settings may not be safe to apply topically at that concentration. These medicines may also not absorb through the skin well enough to kill mites in burrows, pustules, nodules, or crusts. Ivermectin is the only medicine with strong evidence for efficacy when taken by mouth so swallowing teas, tinctures, oils, or pills is unlikely to help resolve an infestation.

=== Communities ===
Scabies is endemic in many developing countries, and it tends to be particularly prevalent in rural and remote areas. In such settings, community-wide control strategies are required to reduce the rate of disease, as treatment of only individuals is ineffective due to the high rate of reinfection. Large-scale mass drug administration strategies may be required where coordinated interventions aim to treat whole communities in one concerted effort. Although such strategies have shown to be able to reduce the burden of scabies in these kinds of communities, debate remains about the best strategy to adopt, including the choice of drug.

The resources required to implement such large-scale interventions in a cost-effective and sustainable way are significant. Furthermore, since endemic scabies is largely restricted to poor and remote areas, it is a public health issue that has not attracted much attention from policymakers and international donors.

== Epidemiology ==
Scabies is one of the three most common skin disorders in children, along with tinea and pyoderma. As of 2010, it affects about 100 million people (1.5% of the population) and its frequency is not related to gender. The mites are distributed around the world and equally infect all ages, races, and socioeconomic classes in different climates. Scabies is more often seen in crowded areas with unhygienic living conditions. Globally as of 2009, an estimated 300 million cases of scabies occur each year, although various parties claim the figure is either over- or underestimated. About 1–10% of the global population is estimated to be infected with scabies, but in certain populations, the infection rate may be as high as 50–80%.

== History ==
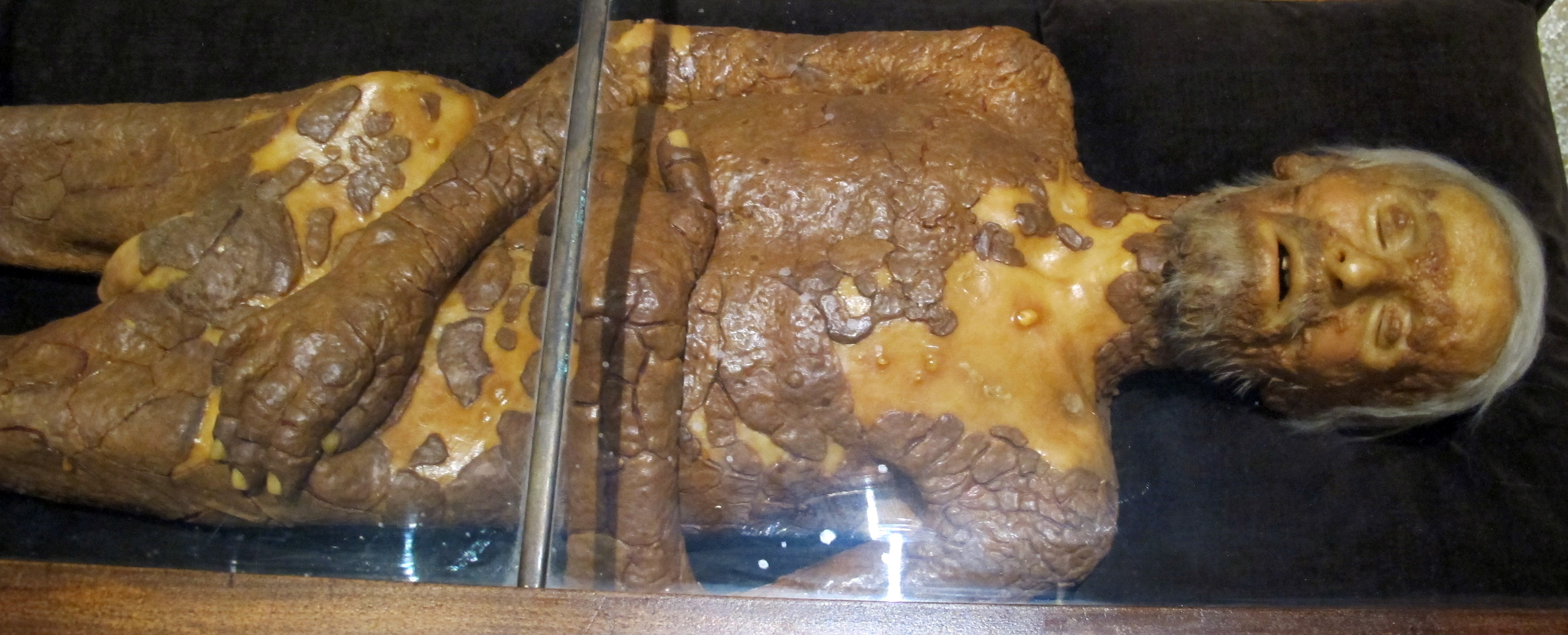
Wax figurine of a man with crusted scabies

Scabies has been observed in humans since ancient times. Archeological evidence from Egypt and the Middle East suggests scabies was present as early as 494 BC. In the fourth century BC, Aristotle reported on "lice" that "escape from little pimples if they are pricked" – a description consistent with scabies. Arab physician Ibn Zuhr is believed to have been the first to provide a clinical description of the scabies mites.

Roman encyclopedist and medical writer Aulus Cornelius Celsus (circa 25 BC – 50 AD) is credited with naming the disease "scabies" and describing its characteristic features. The parasitic etiology of scabies was documented by Italian physician Giovanni Cosimo Bonomo (1663–1696) in his 1687 letter, "Observations concerning the fleshworms of the human body". Bonomo's description established scabies as one of the first human diseases with a well-understood cause.

In Europe in the late 19th through mid-20th centuries, a sulfur-bearing ointment called by the medical eponym of Wilkinson's ointment was widely used for topical treatment of scabies. The contents and origins of several versions of the ointment were detailed in correspondence published in the British Medical Journal in 1945.

== Scabies in animals ==
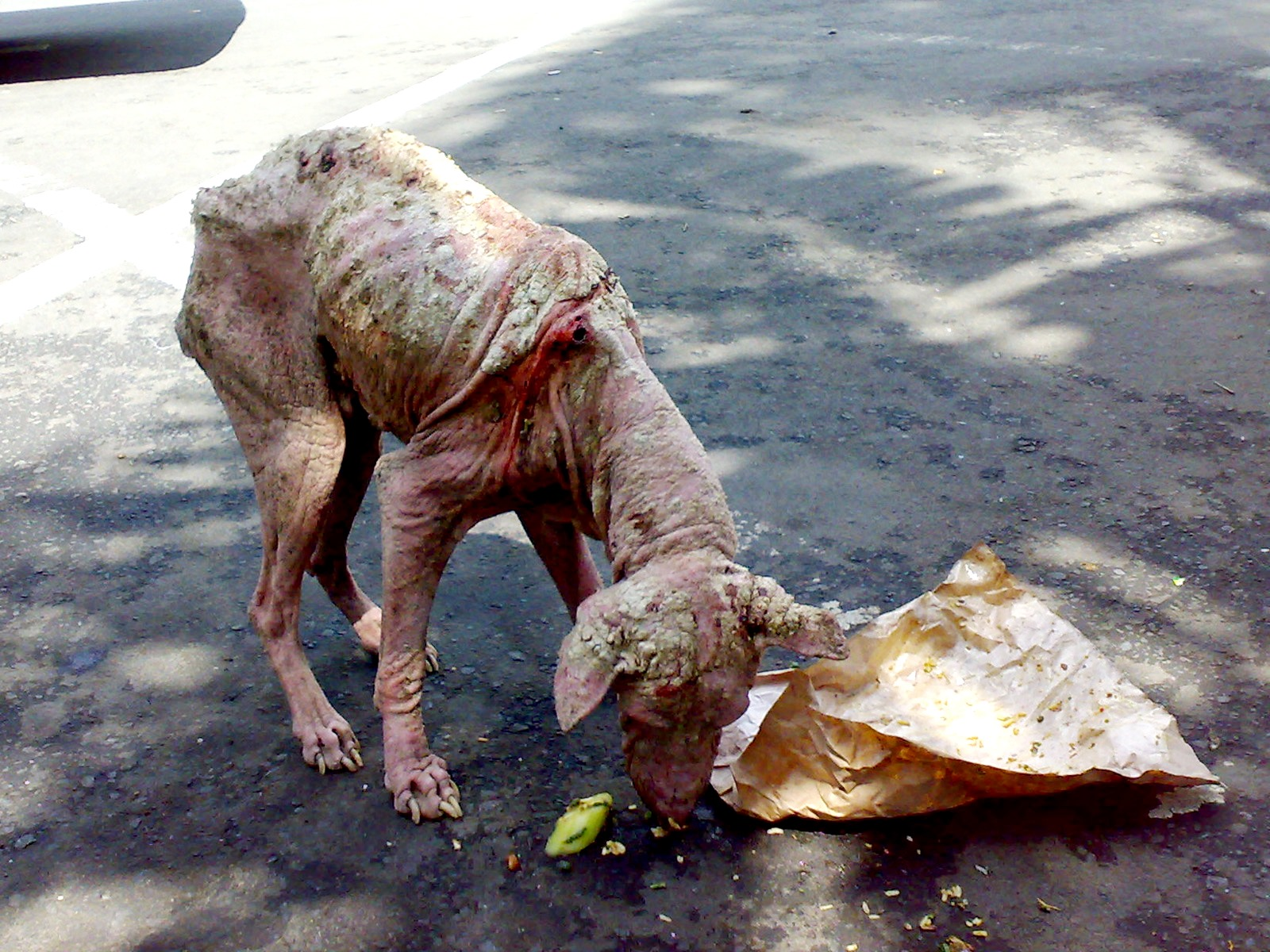
A street dog in Bali, Indonesia, with sarcoptic mange

Scabies may occur in some domestic and wild animals; the mites that cause these infestations are of different subspecies from the one typically causing the human form. These subspecies can infest animals that are not their usual hosts, but such infections do not last long. Scabies-infected animals experience severe itching and secondary skin infections. They often lose weight and become frail.

The most frequently diagnosed form of scabies in domestic animals is sarcoptic mange, caused by the subspecies Sarcoptes scabiei canis, most commonly in dogs and cats. Sarcoptic mange is transmissible to humans who come into prolonged contact with infested animals, and is distinguished from human scabies by its distribution on skin surfaces covered by clothing. Scabies-infected domestic fowl develop what is known as "scaly leg". Domestic animals that have gone feral and have no veterinary care are frequently affected by scabies. Nondomestic animals have also been observed to develop scabies. Gorillas, for instance, are known to be susceptible to infection by contact with items used by humans, and it is a fatal disease of wombats.

Scabies is also a concern for cattle.

== Society and culture ==
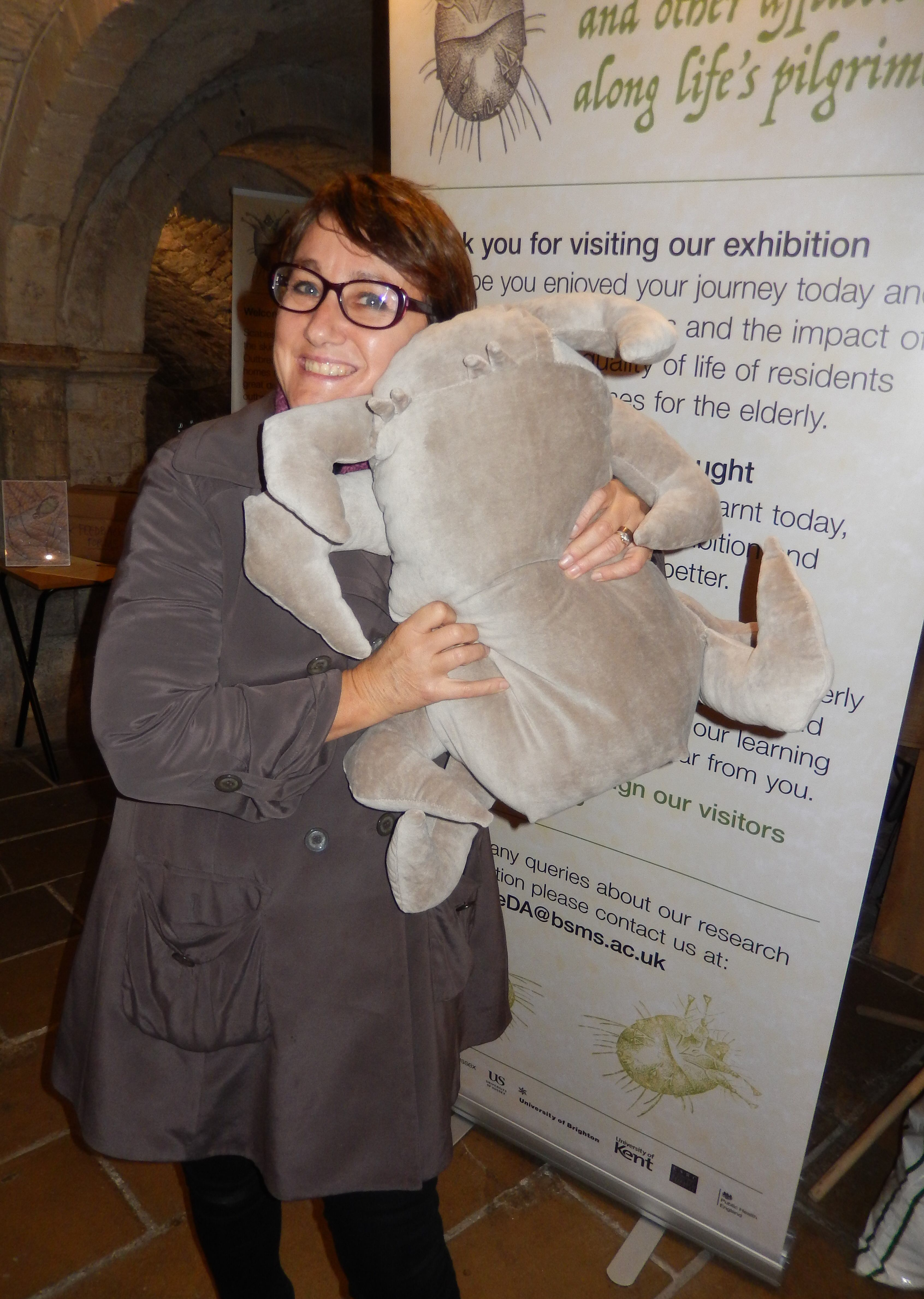
Public health worker Stefania Lanzia using a soft toy scabies mite to publicise the condition in a 2016 campaign

The International Alliance for the Control of Scabies was started in 2012, and brings together over 150 researchers, clinicians, and public-health experts from more than 15 countries. It has managed to bring the global health implications of scabies to the attention of the World Health Organization (WHO). Consequently, the WHO has included scabies on its official list of neglected tropical diseases and other neglected conditions.

== Research ==
Moxidectin is being evaluated as a treatment for scabies. It is established in veterinary medicine to treat a range of parasites, including sarcoptic mange. Its advantage over ivermectin is its longer half-life in humans, thus the potential duration of action.
