= Ear mite =

Common name of many species of mites that live in the ears of animals and humans

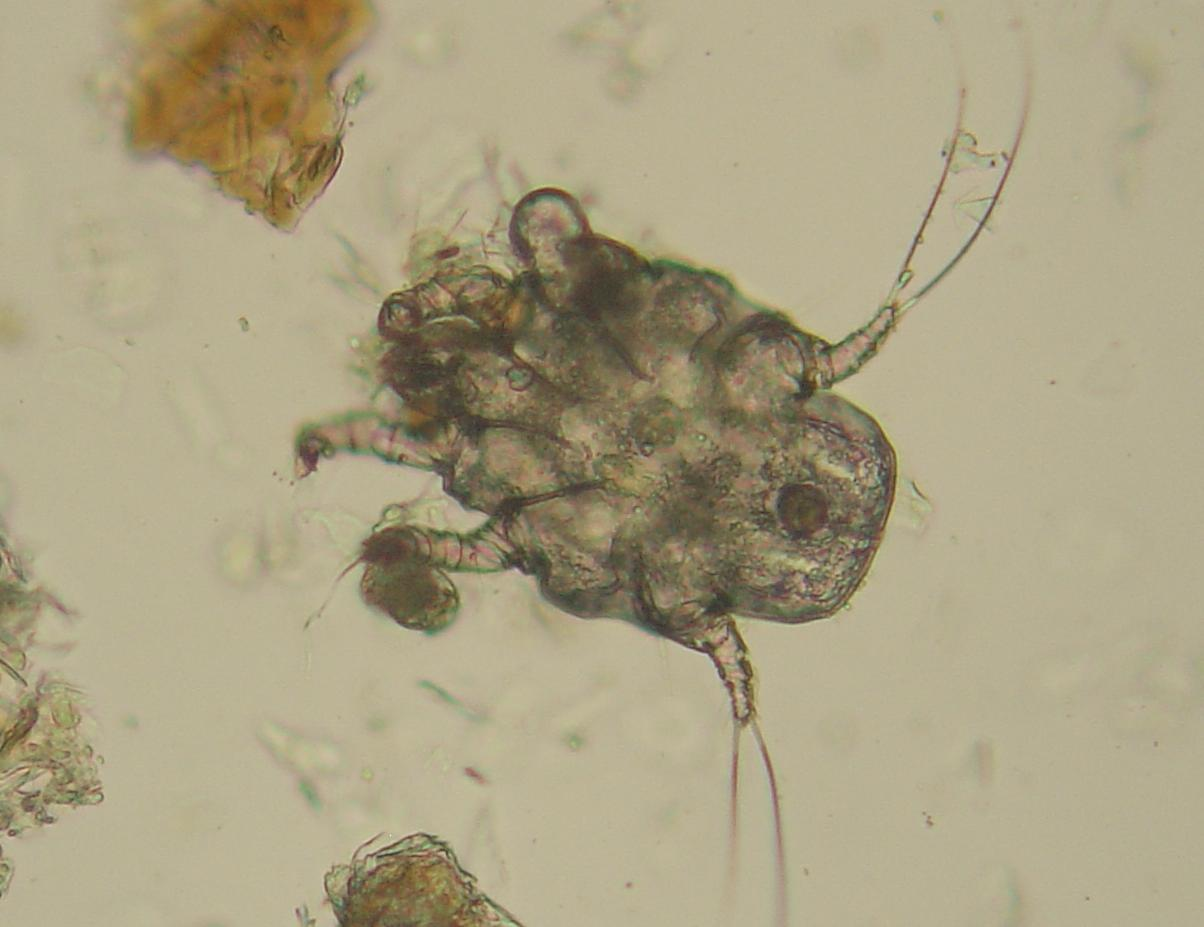
Otodectes cynotis

Ear mites are mites that live in the ears of animals. The most commonly seen species in veterinary medicine is Otodectes cynotis (Gk. oto=ear, dectes=biter, cynotis=of the dog). This species, despite its name, is also responsible for 90% of ear mite infections in felines.

In veterinary practice, ear mite infections in dogs and cats may present as a disease that causes intense itching in one or both ears, which in turn triggers scratching at the affected ear. An unusually dark colored ear wax (cerumen) may also be produced. Cats, as well as dogs with erect ears that have control over ear direction, may be seen with one or both ear pinnas held at an odd or flattened angle.

The most common lesion associated with ear mites is an open or crusted ("scabbed") skin wound at the back or base of the ear, caused by abrasion of the skin by hind limb claws, as the ear has been scratched in an attempt to relieve the itching. This lesion often becomes secondarily infected and crusted from ordinary skin bacteria, so that the common presentation of ear mites is such a wound appearing on the back or base of one or both ears. This is accompanied by the pinnal-pedal reflex that appears as reflex scratching motions of the hind limb when the ear is manipulated (this test is positive as well in other mite infections of the outside and rim of the ear pinnas in mange). When the ear mite infection is treated, such wounds resolve spontaneously, and this resolution may be speeded with application of topical antibiotics.

The most common ear mite (as well as mange mite) treatments currently use the antiparasitics ivermectin and selamectin, usually as topical preparations. Ivermectin is available as a direct water-based liquid that is squeezed into the ear canal and massaged at the base of the ear to distribute the medication. Selamectin is available as a once-a-month preparation that can be applied to the animal's skin, which prevents mite infestation over that time.

== Contagion ==
Ear mites spread rapidly, and can be transmitted from even brief physical contact with other animals. In pets, ear mites most commonly affect cats, ferrets, and to a lesser extent dogs. In rare cases, they may also infect humans. Infected animals have a large amount of crumbly dark brown material in their ears. On close inspection, tiny white mites can barely be seen in the debris, as they are nearly microscopic. Ear mites do not burrow as some mites do, but live within the ear canal.

== Life cycle ==
The life cycle of an individual mite is about four weeks, with eggs hatching on the third or fourth day after laying. Female mites are able to reproduce after about three weeks.

== Consequences of infection ==
The ear mite is the most common cause of ear infections in cats, quickly spreading from one cat to another through direct contact. Ear mites cause inflammatory symptoms, similar to bacterial and yeast infections. Symptoms include itching and redness of the ears. Other, more serious problems can result from untreated infections, such as skin disease in areas other than the ear like the neck and tail, and deafness.

== Ear mites in rabbits ==
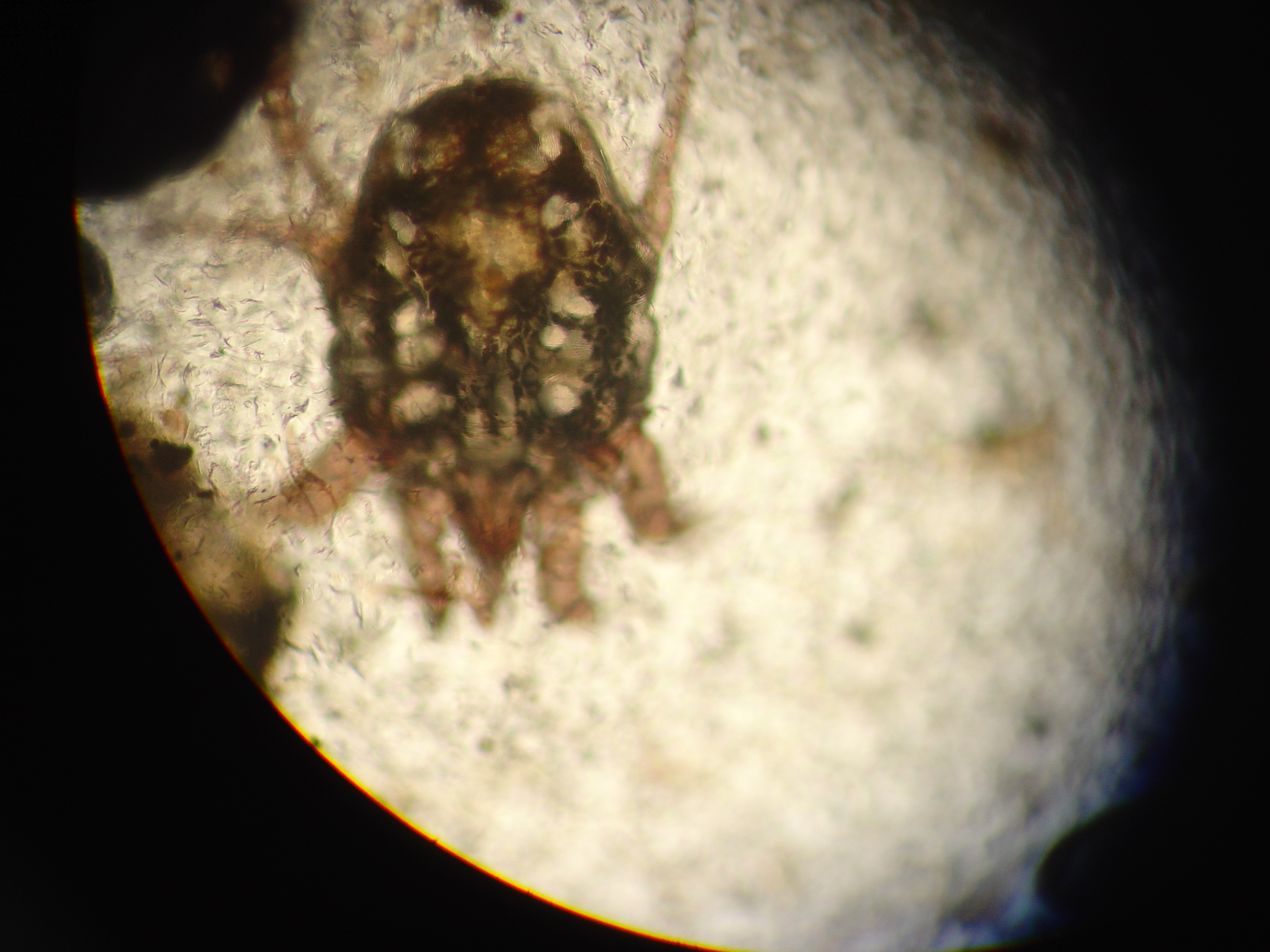
Psoroptes cuniculi

The rabbit ear mite, Psoroptes cuniculi, is larger than Otodectes cynotis. It causes thick firm debris to form in the ear canal, and can eventually migrate to the skin of the outer ear and face. Symptoms include scratching and shaking of the head. Treatment includes topical selamectin, or injections of ivermectin and frequent cleanings of the rabbit's environment.

== Treatment ==
Ear mites of dogs and cats can be treated with any of the spot-on preparations available from veterinary surgeons as well as over the counter at many pet stores and online. If the chosen solution does not destroy mite eggs, treatment should be repeated after one month, to catch the next generation of mites that will have hatched by then. Relief, in terms of the cat or dog no longer scratching at its ears, will be noticeable within a few hours. However, since mite irritation is partly allergic (see scabies), symptoms may also outlive mites by weeks. Moreover, it may take topical antibiotics and several weeks to clear infected external wounds caused by scratching on the exterior surfaces of cat and dog ears.

Options for treating ear mites in rabbits are the related antiparasitics ivermectin and selamectin. Both of these antiparasitics have also been used with good effect in cats and dogs. A topical preparation of 0.01% ivermectin (Acarexx) can be used directly as an oil in cat ears, and the related new generation drug selamectin (brand name "Revolution") is available as a once-per-month skin treatment for both dogs and cats, which will prevent new mite infestation as well as a number of other parasitic diseases. As with ivermectin, selamectin must be used with caution in collies and herder breeds with the possibility for homozygous MDR1 mutations.

A single treatment with a topical formulation containing fipronil, (S)-methoprene, eprinomectin and praziquantel was shown to be efficient for the prevention of Otodectes cynotis infestation in cats. Methoprene is able to prevent eggs from hatching and stop mites from maturing; the rest are all parasite-killing drugs.
