= Esafoxolaner/eprinomectin/praziquantel =

Combination medication

Combination of
- Esafoxolaner: aryl isoxazoline
- Eprinomectin: avermectin anthelmintic
- Praziquantel: pyrazinoisoquinoline anthelmintic

Clinical data
- Trade names: Nexgard Combo
- License data: US DailyMed: Esafoxolaner, eprinomectin, and praziquantel
- Routes of administration: Topical
- ATC code: QP54AA54 (WHO), QP52AA51 (WHO)

Legal status
- Legal status: CA: ℞-only; US: ℞-only

Esafoxolaner/eprinomectin/praziquantel, sold under the brand name Nexgard Combo, is a fixed-dose combination medication used for the treatment and control of flea infestations, ticks, ear mites, and infections caused by tapeworms and Toxocara cati in cats. It is also used for the prevention of heartworm disease Dirofilaria immitis. It contains esafoxolaner, an aryl isoxazoline; eprinomectin, an avermectin anthelmintic; and praziquantel, a pyrazinoisoquinoline anthelmintic.

== Veterinary uses ==
In the United States, esafoxolaner/eprinomectin/praziquantel is indicated for the prevention of heartworm disease caused by Dirofilaria immitis and for the treatment and control of roundworm (fourth stage larval and adult Toxocara cati), hookworm (fourth stage larval and adult Ancylostoma tubaeforme; adult Ancylostoma braziliense), and tapeworm (Dipylidium caninum) infections. It kills adult fleas (Ctenocephalides felis) and is indicated for the treatment and prevention of flea infestations and the treatment and control of Ixodes scapularis (black-legged tick) and Amblyomma americanum (lone star tick) infestations for one month in cats and kittens eight weeks of age and older, and weighing 1.8 pounds (0.82 kg) or greater.
