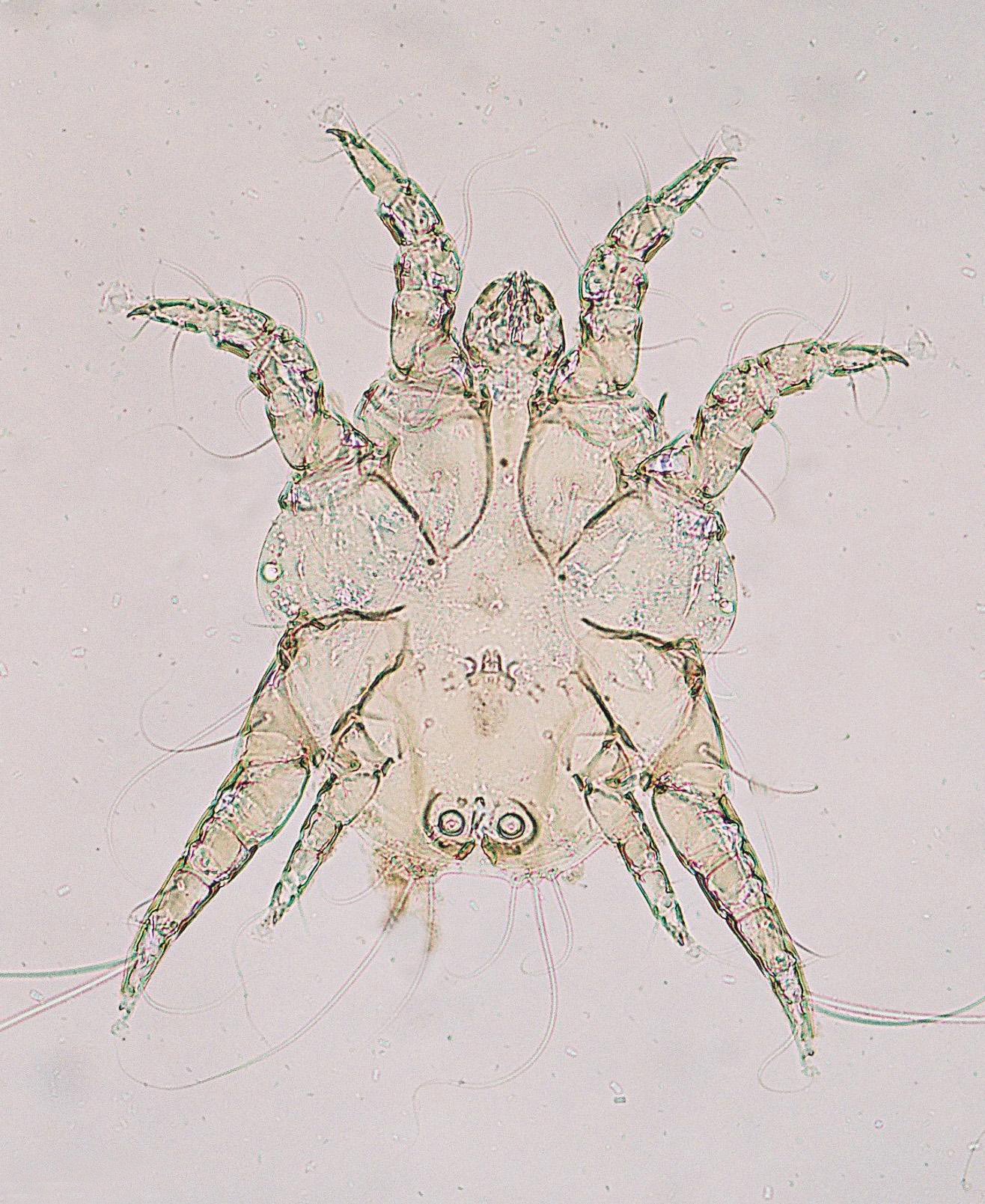
- Chorioptes bovis, a species in Psoroptidae

Scientific classification
- Kingdom: Animalia
- Phylum: Arthropoda
- Subphylum: Chelicerata
- Class: Arachnida
- Order: Sarcoptiformes
- Superfamily: Sarcoptoidea
- Family: Psoroptidae

Genera and species
- Caparinia; Caparinia ictonyctis; Caparinia tripilis; Chorioptes; Chorioptes bovis (chorioptic mange mite); Chorioptes panda; Chorioptes sweatmani; Chorioptes texanus; Otodectes; Otodectes cynotis (ear mite); Psoroptes; Psoroptes cervinus (scabies mite); Psoroptes cuniculi (rabbit ear mite); Psoroptes natalensis; Psoroptes ovis (sheep scab mite)

= Psoroptidae =

Family of mites

Psoroptidae is a family of parasitic mites, which are 1–2 mm (0.039–0.079 in) long and live on the surface of the skin, rather than burrowing into it. These mites affect various species, including cats, dogs, rabbits, cattle, sheep, and horses, causing skin inflammation, scabs, crusting, and hair loss.

The following genera are within the family Psoroptidae:

- Psoroptes
- Chorioptes
- Otodectes

== See also ==
- List of mites associated with cutaneous reactions
