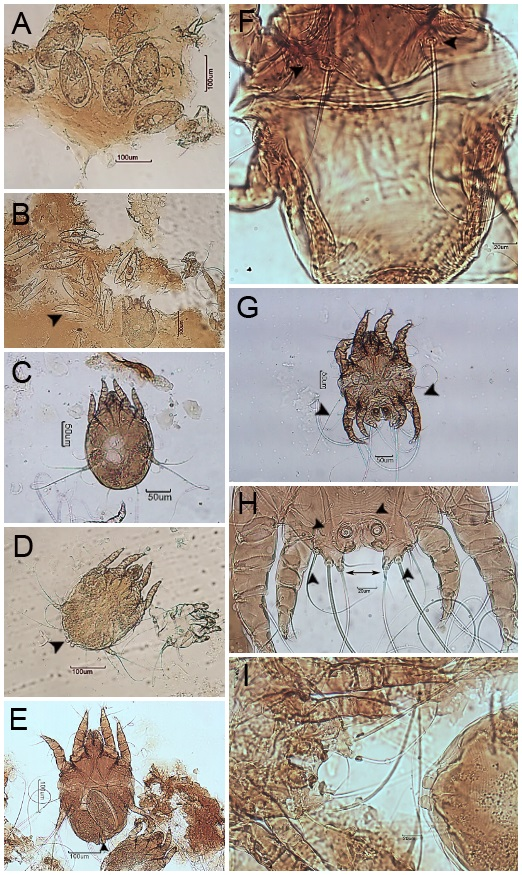
- C. tripilis collected on an African Pygmy Hedgehog

Scientific classification
- Kingdom: Animalia
- Phylum: Arthropoda
- Subphylum: Chelicerata
- Class: Arachnida
- Order: Sarcoptiformes
- Family: Psoroptidae
- Genus: Caparinia
- Species: C. tripilis

Binomial name
- Caparinia tripilis (Michael, 1889)

= Caparinia tripilis =

Species of mite

Caparinia tripilis is a species of mite, causing mange. It is known to infect hedgehogs.
