= Selamectin =

Topical parasiticide for dogs and cats

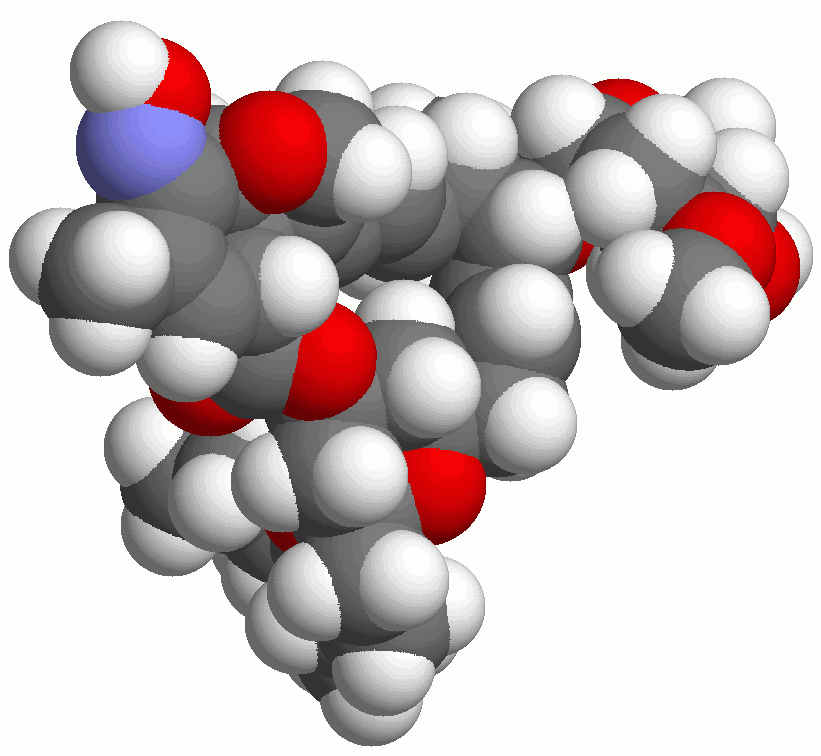

Clinical data
- Trade names: Revolution, Stronghold, Revolt
- Other names: 25-cyclohexyl-25-de(1-methylpropyl)-5-deoxy-22,23-dihydro-5-(hydroxyimino)-avermectin B1 monosaccharide
- AHFS/Drugs.com: International Drug Names
- License data: US DailyMed: Selamectin
- Routes of administration: Topical
- ATCvet code: QP54AA05 (WHO) QP54AA55 (WHO)

Legal status
- Legal status: US: ℞-only; EU: Rx-only

Identifiers
- CAS Number: 220119-17-5
- PubChem CID: 9578507
- ChemSpider: 16738655
- UNII: A2669OWX9N
- ChEMBL: ChEMBL160777
- CompTox Dashboard (EPA): DTXSID6045903
- ECHA InfoCard: 100.250.168

Chemical and physical data
- Formula: C_{43}H_{63}NO_{11}
- Molar mass: 769.973 g·mol^{−1}
- 3D model (JSmol): Interactive image
- SMILES: C[C@H]1CC[C@]2(C[C@@H]3C[C@H](O2)C/C=C(/[C@H]([C@H](/C=C/C=C/4\CO[C@H]\5[C@@]4([C@@H](C=C(/C5=N/O)C)C(=O)O3)O)C)O[C@H]6C[C@@H]([C@H]([C@@H](O6)C)O)OC)\C)O[C@@H]1C7CCCCC7
- InChI: InChI=1S/C43H63NO11/c1-24-11-10-14-30-23-50-40-36(44-48)27(4)19-33(43(30,40)47)41(46)52-32-20-31(16-15-25(2)38(24)53-35-21-34(49-6)37(45)28(5)51-35)54-42(22-32)18-17-26(3)39(55-42)29-12-8-7-9-13-29/h10-11,14-15,19,24,26,28-29,31-35,37-40,45,47-48H,7-9,12-13,16-18,20-23H2,1-6H3/b11-10+,25-15+,30-14+,44-36-/t24-,26-,28-,31+,32-,33-,34-,35-,37-,38-,39-,40+,42+,43+/m0/s1; Key:AFJYYKSVHJGXSN-XHKIUTQPSA-N

Selamectin, sold under the brand name Revolution, among others, is a topical parasiticide and anthelminthic used on dogs and cats. It treats and prevents infections of heartworms, fleas, ear mites, sarcoptic mange (scabies), and certain types of ticks in dogs, and prevents heartworms, fleas, ear mites, hookworms, and roundworms in cats. It is structurally related to ivermectin and milbemycin. Selamectin is not approved for human use.

== Veterinary uses ==
Selamectin is applied topically. It is not miscible in water.

== Mode of action ==
Selamectin disables parasites by activating glutamate-gated chloride channels at muscle synapses. Selamectin activates the chloride channel without desensitization, allowing chloride ions to enter the nerve cells and causing neuromuscular paralysis, impaired muscular contraction, and eventual death.

The substance fights both internal and surface parasitic infection. Absorbed into the body through the skin and hair follicles, it travels through the bloodstream, intestines, and sebaceous glands; parasites ingest the drug when they feed on the animal's blood or secretions.

== Side effects ==
Selamectin has been found to be safe and effective in a 2003 review.

Selamectin has high safety ratings, with less than 1% of pets displaying side effects. In cases where side-effects do occur, they most often include passing irritation or hair loss at the application site. Symptoms beyond these (such as drooling, rapid breathing, lack of coordination, vomiting, or diarrhea) could be due to shock as a result of selamectin killing heartworms or other vulnerable parasites present at high levels in the bloodstreams of dogs. This would be a reaction due to undetected or underestimated infections prior to using the medication, rather than an actual allergic reaction to the drug itself.

== Society and culture ==
=== Brand names ===
Selamectin is sold under various brand names including Selehold, manufactured by KRKA, Selarid manufactured by Norbrook Laboratories Limited, Revolution and Stronghold manufactured by Zoetis, Revolt manufactured by Aurora Pharmaceuticals, and Senergy manufactured by Virbac.

=== Similar products ===
Main rival products for dogs include ivermectin (trade names Stromectol, Ivermec and others) or milbemycin oxime (Interceptor) for heartworms, imidacloprid and moxidectin (Advocate), fipronil (Frontline) or lufenuron (Program) for fleas, or the combination milbemycin oxime/lufenuron (Sentinel) for both.
