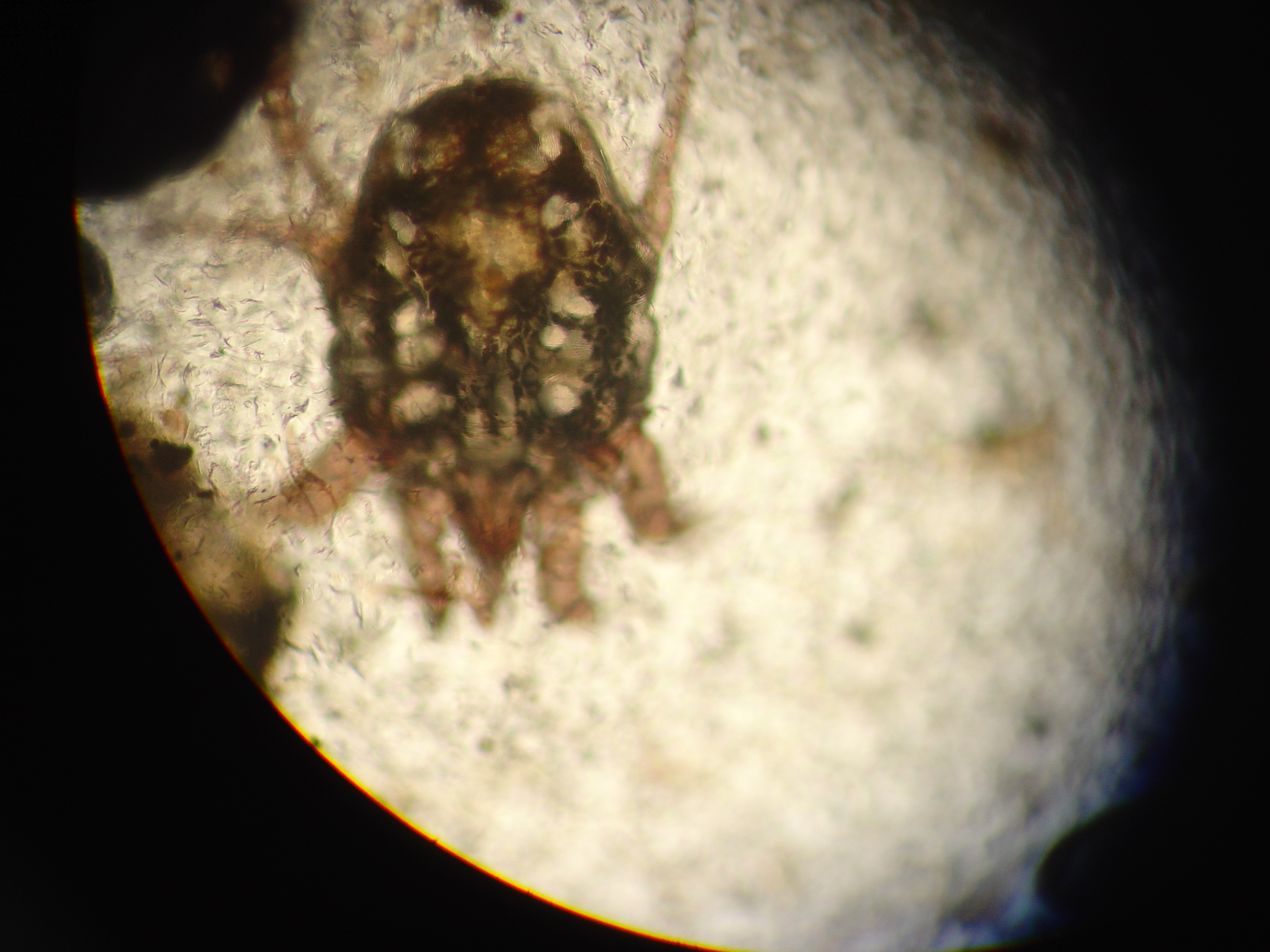
- Psoroptes cuniculi

Scientific classification
- Kingdom: Animalia
- Phylum: Arthropoda
- Subphylum: Chelicerata
- Class: Arachnida
- Order: Sarcoptiformes
- Family: Psoroptidae
- Genus: Psoroptes; Gervais, 1841
- Species: P. equi

Binomial name
- Psoroptes equi (Hering, 1838)

Synonyms
- Psoroptes cuniculi (Delafond, 1859); Psoroptes ovis (Hering, 1838); Psoroptes cervinus Ward, 1915; Psoroptes natalensis Hirst, 1919

= Psoroptes =

Genus of mites

Psoroptes is a genus of mites, including the agents that cause psoroptic mange.

== Psoroptic mange ==
Psoroptes on a rabbit ear crust

Psoroptes mites are responsible for causing psoroptic mange in various animals, leading to economic losses among farmers of cattle, sheep and goats. It is also known as sheep scab and cattle scab. The disease is highly infectious, and is transmitted via fenceposts and other structures that livestock use when scratching themselves. The mites have mouthparts which do not pierce the skin, but are adapted to feeding on the surface, where the mites abrade the stratum corneum. See Mites of livestock for photographs of infestations by Psoroptes.

== Taxonomy ==
Psoroptes has been traditionally considered to include five species living on different host species, but genetic analysis has reduced the genus to a single species, Psoroptes ovis.
