= Mites of livestock =

Small crawling animals related to ticks and spiders

Mites are small crawling animals related to ticks and spiders. Most mites are free-living and harmless. Other mites are parasitic, and those that infest livestock animals cause many diseases that are widespread, reduce production and profit for farmers, and are expensive to control.

Mites are invertebrates, arthropods with a chitinous exoskeleton and jointed limbs. Within the Arthropoda, they belong in the subclass Acari (or Acarina) and species belonging to the Acari are informally known as acarines. Although both acarines and insects (class Insecta) are studied in the fields of veterinary and medical parasitology, acarines are separated from insects by structure, feeding, lifecycles, and disease relations. Both livestock and companion animals are susceptible to mite infestation and although this article will focus on livestock, the two are similar. Humans also may become infested by contagion from these domestic animals (a zoonosis). Infestation by mites usually causes skin diseases known as mange, scab, demodecosis, or in general as acariasis. The causation, economic impact, and control of these diseases in livestock are described in this article. Mites that cause disease in honey bees are described in Varroa destructor.

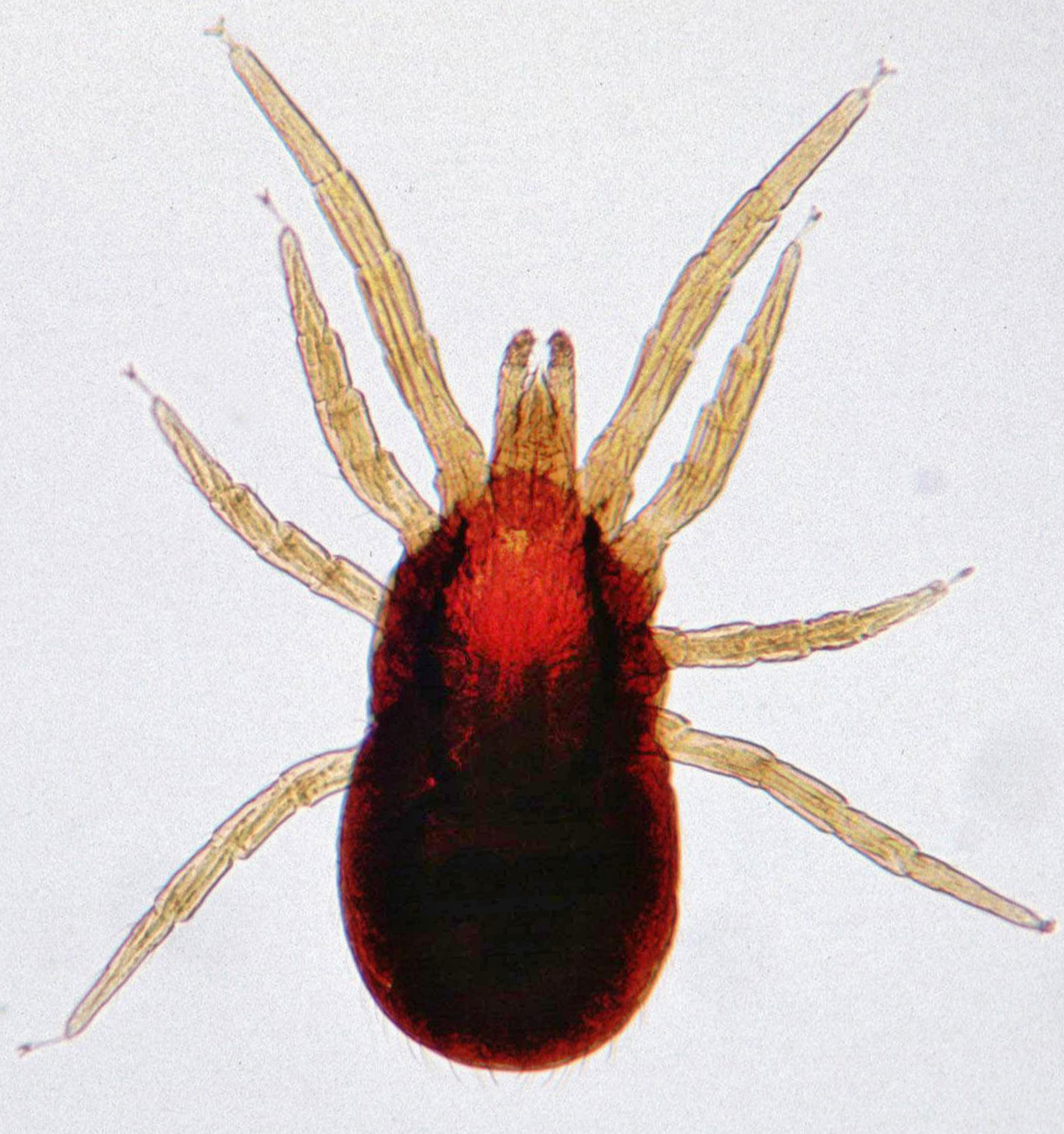
Adult poultry red mite, Dermanyssus gallinae

== Classification, lifecycles, anatomy, and feeding ==
=== Classification ===
Over 48,000 species of mites are described, and an estimated half-million more are yet to be discovered. Acarines parasitic on livestock animals are classified to family level in the list below. The taxonomy of the Acari is complex, several versions exist, and their phylogeny is considered to be paraphyletic (originating from several ancestral lines). The Acari are a subclass of the class Arachnida. Within the Acari are two superorders: the Acariformes and the Parasitiformes. The list below (Outline classification) is simplified for this veterinary article by omitting the superorders, orders, and suborders; this emphasizes the pragmatic taxonomic level of families, together with vernacular names. Within this list, the Parasitiformes include the blood-sucking mites of birds, the hard ticks, and the soft ticks, whilst the Acariformes include the psoroptic and sarcoptic mites, the trombiculids, and the demodectic mites.

The identification of many types of mites is work for a specialist. However, the mites parasitic on vertebrate animals can readily be identified to at least the level of genus by nonspecialists if the clinical context of host species and site of infestation on skin or other organs is used. Also, the two main families of ticks are added to the list of acarine families because these common parasites are closely related to mites, and as larvae may be confused with them at infestations. The third tick family, the Nuttalliellidae, consists of one rare species. Ticks require separate accounts because they have distinctly different feeding mechanisms and relations to disease. Distinguishing acarines from insects (subphylum Hexapoda) is similarly important because the term 'insect' is often used in popular text and speech for various small crawling animals. The generalized anatomy of an acarine as shown in the diagram below can be compared with that of an insect as in typical parasitic flies of domestic animals.

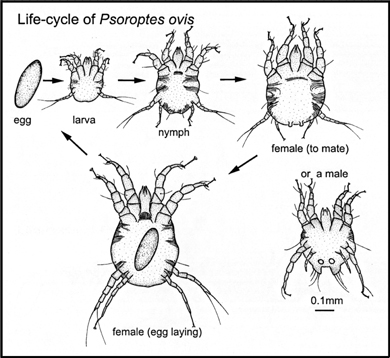
Lifecycle of the sheep scab-mite

=== Outline classification ===
Phylum: Arthropoda (insects, acarines, crustaceans, arachnids etc.)

Subphylum: Chelicerata (acarines, scorpions, horseshoe crabs, solfugids, etc.)

Class: Arachnida (mites, ticks, spiders, scorpions, etc.)

Subclass: Acari (mites and ticks)

[Superorders, orders and suborders omitted]

Family: Psoroptidae (psoroptic mites)
Family: Psorergatidae (itch mites)
Family: Sarcoptidae (sarcoptic mites)
Family: Cytoditidae (air-sac mites)
Family: Laminosioptidae (fowl cyst mites)
Family: Analgidae (feather mites)
Family: Trombiculidae (trombiculid or chigger mites)
Family: Demodicidae (follicle mites)
Family: Dermanyssidae (blood-sucking mites of birds)

also Family: Argasidae (soft ticks)
also Family: Ixodidae (hard ticks)

=== Lifecycles ===
Mites have a lifecycle in which larvae hatch from the eggs, then feed and molt into nymphs. Several stages of nymphs may follow (another term for stages in this context is instar). The final molt produces an adult female or male. The early form of the female is described as pubescent (ready for mating) and may be equipped with protuberances that couple with matching sockets on the male during fertilization. Such coupled mites are a natural occurrence in skin-scrape samples of mites for diagnosis. Once mated, the female continues to develop and lay eggs; or in the typical case of Psoroptes for example, females produce one large egg at a time. In most parasitic mites, the entire lifecycle takes place on the host, with all stages present simultaneously (an exception is the trombiculid mites where the nymphs and adults are free-living). This type of lifecycle, with all active stages resembling each other in structure and feeding mechanism, is called incomplete metamorphosis (or hemimetabolism). A metamorphosis is a distinct change of body shape. When the larval stages of an invertebrate animal are completely different from the adult stage, as with caterpillars changing into butterflies, a complete metamorphosis occurs (holometabolism).

=== Anatomy and morphology ===
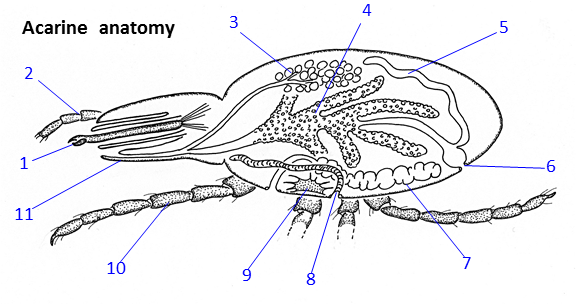
1 Chelicerae, 2 Palps, 3 Salivary glands, 4 Gut, 5 Excretory (Malpighian) tubules, 6 Anus, 7 Ovary or testes, 8 Air-breathing tubes (tracheae), 9 Central ganglion, 10 Legs, 11 Hypostome

The parasitic mites are either just visible to the naked eye or one needs a microscope to see them clearly. The distinct body segmentation characteristic of most arthropods is greatly reduced in the Acari. At the left of the diagram is an anterior section bearing the mouthparts (gnathosoma or capitulum), and at right, a posterior section comprising the main body (idiosoma). Mouthparts are characterized by a central pair of chelicerae, a ventral hypostome, and a lateral pair of palps. Chelicerae are protrusible, cutting or piercing structures essential to feeding. Palps are of sensory function during feeding and do not penetrate the host's skin. Acarines have no antennae and, except for some genera of ticks, are without eyes. A tube for ingesting food and secreting saliva is formed by apposition of both the chelicerae and the hypostome. The main body bears three pairs of legs in the larvae and four pairs in the nymphs and adults. The legs are multiple-jointed and operate by contraction of their internal muscles. The distal segment of the legs, the tarsus, is equipped with a terminal claw or pair of claws and sometimes with an adhesive pad or sucker that enables the mite to crawl up smooth surfaces. The internal organs (or viscera) include a tubular gut with a posterior anus, paired excretory tubes (Malpighian tubules) that empty out into the anus, paired respiratory tubes (tracheae) that carry atmospheric air directly up against the viscera, paired salivary glands with ducts to the mouthparts, female or male reproductive organs (ovary or testes), and a central nervous ganglion that acts as a simple brain.

=== Feeding methods ===
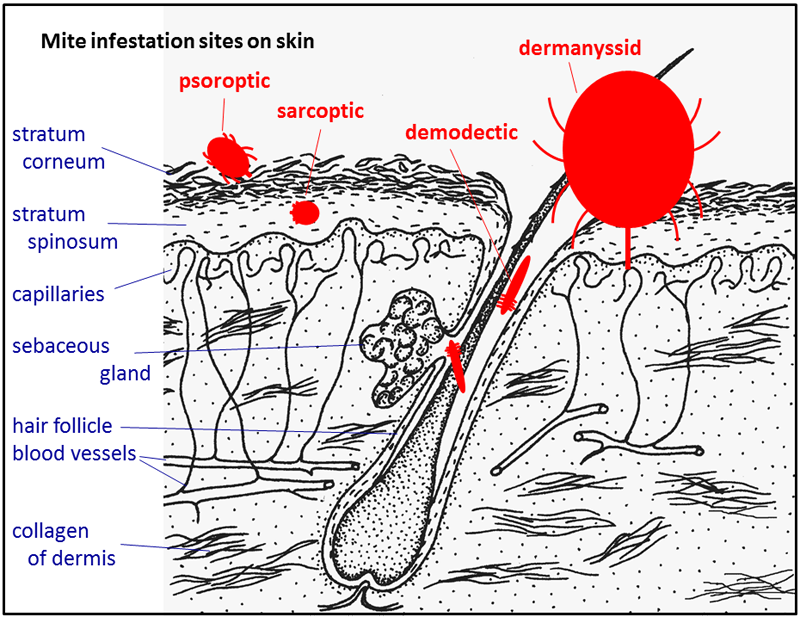
Sites of infestation of different groups of mites on or in skin

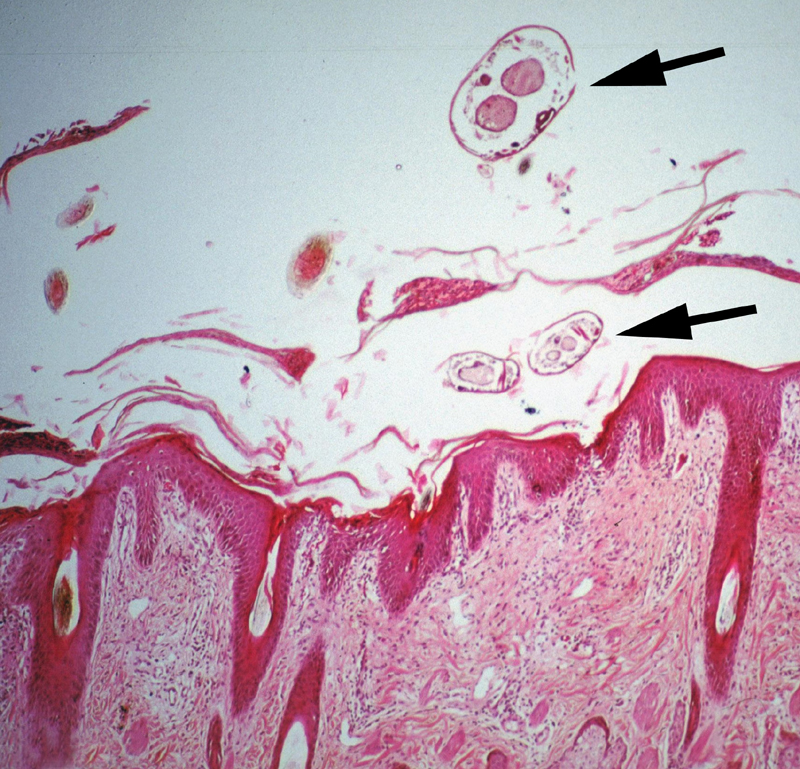
Psoroptes ovis mite infestation of skin; histological section: Mites, arrowed, shown in superficial layers of epidermis

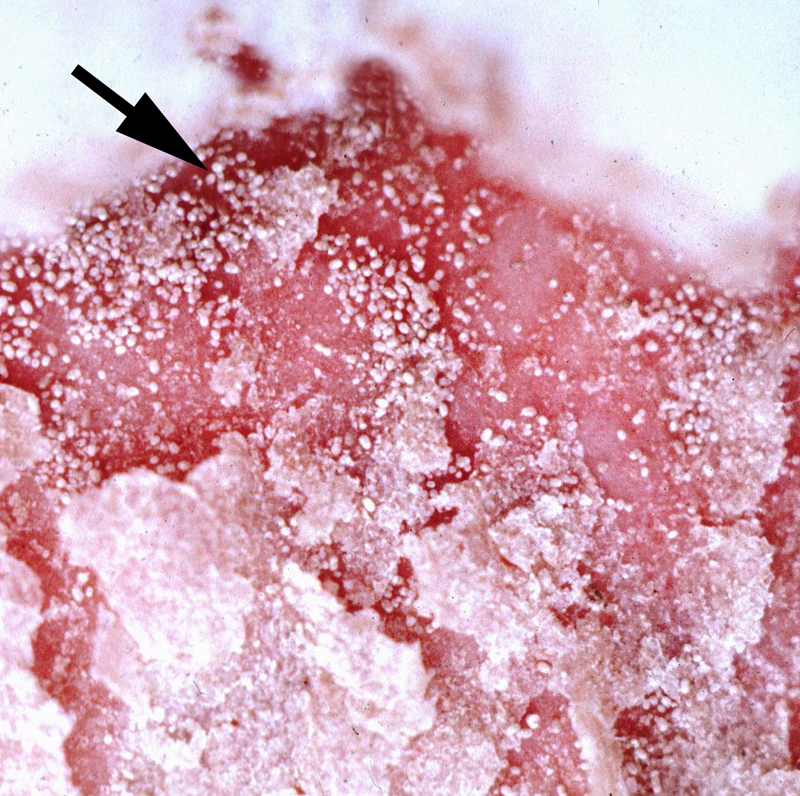
Psoroptes ovis mites (white dots) on sheep skin, causing sheep scab disease

The diagram Mite infestation sites on skin shows where typical infestations of different taxonomic groups mites on livestock animals occur on or in the host's skin. The position of these mites in relation to the skin or other organs is crucial for their feeding and also for their veterinary diagnosis and options for treatment. The mites either feed on the tissues of the skin using penetrating mouthparts or on the inflammatory exudate that results from the action of the mouthparts and saliva of the mites on the skin. Demodectic mites have mouthparts adapted to penetrate and suck out the contents of individual cells of hair follicles. It is usual for all active stages of the mite lifecycle to feed as parasites, but the trombiculid mites are an exception. Most of the parasitic mites do not feed directly on blood, but the dermanyssid mites and larval trombiculid mites directly suck up capillary blood as their exclusive food. The tube through which food is ingested and saliva excreted during feeding is formed in most mites by apposing the sheath that contains the chelicerae against the hypostome. However, the trombiculids are an exception. Some species of mites (Analgidae) have adapted to feeding on keratin and skin debris amongst the feathers of birds, and other species have adapted to feed directly on internal tissues such as air-sacs or lungs (Cytoditidae and Laminosioptidae). Psoroptic mites feed superficially at the stratum corneum; the photograph of a histological section of skin infested with Psoroptes ovis, and the photograph of the surface of a host's skin infested with P. ovis looking like white dots, show this type of feeding. Sarcoptic mites feed by burrowing within the living layers of the epidermis, mainly stratum spinosum. Demodectic mites feed in a position technically external to the skin, between the epidermis and the hair shaft in hair follicles. Dermanyssid and trombiculid mites feed whilst external to the skin by piercing the skin with, respectively, their chelicerae or a stylostome feeding tube. Mites at other sites feed by using their chelicerae to scrape either at the skin surface, or at base of feather, or to penetrate and scrape at internal tissue such as air-sac or lung.

== Families and species of mites causing diseases of livestock ==
=== Psoroptidae ===
Psoroptes ovis is an example of a surface-feeding mite. It commonly infests sheep, and cattle are infrequently infested. Other common psoroptic mites are in the genus Chorioptes. Species of Psoroptes and Chorioptes are very similar in appearance and infest the same species of livestock hosts. A diagnostic aid to differentiate these mites is the shape of the leg suckers. In Psoroptes, these are a small, shallow cup on a long stalk, whilst in Chorioptes, they are deeply cup-shaped with a short stalk. Psoroptic mites as adults are just large enough to see with the naked eye and can crawl readily using long legs. Chorioptes infestations are found on cattle and horses. Psoroptes cuniculi infests rabbits, mainly on their outer ears.

=== Psorergatidae ===
This family includes the species Psorergates bovis which infests cattle and Psorergates ovis which infests sheep. They are similar in appearance to species in the Psoroptidae and infest the skin in a similar way, feeding superficially.

=== Sarcoptidae ===
Skin disease caused by sarcoptic mites is variably called scabies, or in some countries mange. (The adjectives 'mangy' and 'scabby' are used similarly to 'lousy', as both a description of animals probably infested with mites or lice, respectively, and as a general expression of disgust. When wild animals such as foxes and coyotes are sometimes found heavily infested with sarcoptic mites, the description 'mangy' is apt.) Sarcoptes scabiei is an example of a mite that burrows within the living layers of the epidermis of its host. It infests many species of mammals. (Infestations of humans may be zoonotic, that is: transmitted from a wild or domestic animal, for example to a farmer or veterinarian handling an infested pig. Such an infestation is called a zoonosis. However, the subspecies or strain of S. scabiei adapted to humans is transmitted directly between humans, so it is not zoonotic.) Other sarcoptic mites of importance to livestock are in the genus Knemidokoptes (or Cnemidocoptes) which infest birds. Knemidokoptes gallinae, the depluming itch mite of poultry tends to infest the head and upper body, whilst K. mutans the scaly-leg mite, infests the feet.

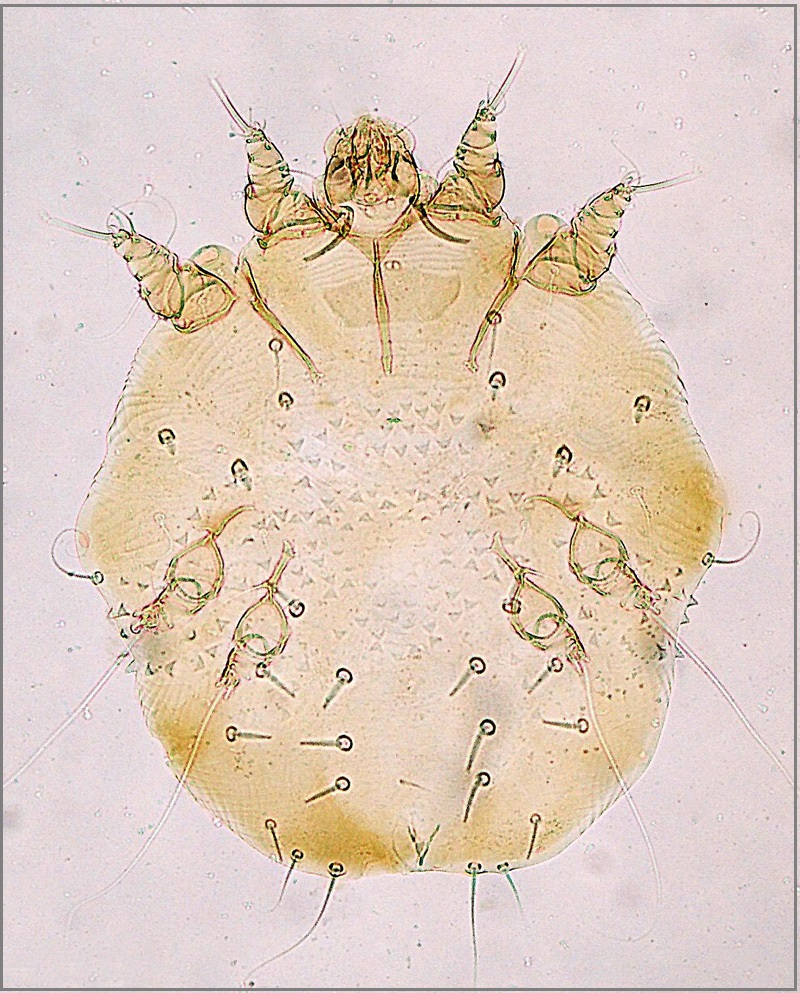
Mange mite of cattle, goats, camels, and pigs, Sarcoptes scabiei

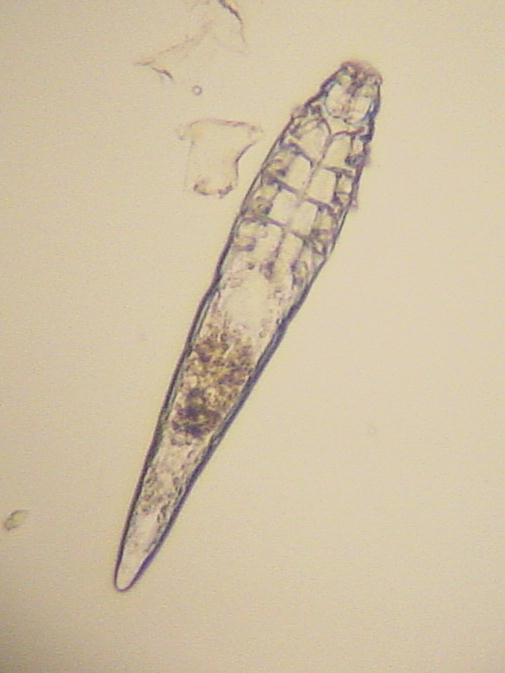
Demodex follicle mite, which typically infests cattle and dogs

=== Cytoditidae and Laminosioptidae ===
Some species of mites have adapted to infesting the internal tissues and organs of their hosts. Cytodites nudus is a typical species of this type; it infests the air-sacs of birds. Laminosioptes cysticola , the fowl cyst mite is another species of mite internally infesting birds. It has a worldwide distribution.

=== Analgidae ===
This family has species with a worldwide distribution that infest the superficial skin layers and feathers of poultry. Megninia ginglymura is a typical species of feather mite.

=== Trombiculidae ===
Trombicula species of mites are sometimes known, when in the larval stage, as berry bug, harvest mites, or chiggers (but not to be confused with jigger or chigoe flea). They feed on blood, but only in the larval stage. The lifecycle starts with eggs laid in the environment of the normal hosts of the larvae, typically rodents and other small mammals. Larvae quest for hosts whilst on vegetation in the same way in which many larval ticks do. After the engorged larva has completed feeding, it detaches from its stylostome feeding tube, drops to the ground, and molts to a nymph. The remaining lifecycle comprises the free-living nymph and adult stages predatory on other minute arthropods. The adults resemble spiders. They actively hunt amongst the ground-level debris layer of vegetation and are conspicuous by their red color and dense outer covering of fine setae, appearing like fur.

=== Demodicidae ===
One genus of mites, Demodex, has adapted to infesting the hair follicles of its hosts. These mites remain external to the true outer layer of the skin (the epidermis) which also lines the tube of the hair follicle. However, the mites appear to be deep within the skin in the sense of being below the general outer surface of the host. The mites fit in the narrow space between the hair and the tube of the follicle. They may also crawl out onto the general epidermal surface of their host. Transmission of these mites from host to host occurs during close contact when young animals are suckled. Demodex mites are morphologically adapted to this constricted habitat: microscopic, worm shaped, and with very short legs. The mites feed on cells of the epidermal lining of the hair follicle. Many species of mammals, including humans, are readily infested with these mites, but typically the density of infestation is very low. However, they are considered parasitic in people with weakened immune systems.

=== Dermanyssidae ===
Dermanyssid mites are much larger than most parasitic mites and are easily visible to the naked eye. They have long, powerful legs that they use to seek their hosts and their size and active crawling cause them to resemble larval ticks. Their lifecycle proceeds from egg to larva to nymph to adult, and all of the active stages are only temporarily parasitic. A single blood meal is completed within a few minutes, so they are found on their hosts only for a short time relative to their time off the host. These types of mites naturally live in the nests of their bird hosts. The species of economic importance to poultry-rearing have adapted to living within the fabric of poultry houses. Their mouthparts are adapted for sucking blood with a pair of long piercing chelicerae. Dermanyssus gallinae, the poultry red mite, is typical. A related genus is Ornithonyssus—O. bursa, the tropical fowl mite, and O. sylvarium, the northern fowl mite.

== Mites as a direct cause of parasitic disease ==
=== Mites found on surface of skin or within the epidermis ===
==== Psoroptic skin disease ====
The clinical manifestation of infestation with psoroptic mites is usually called mange and sometimes scabies, but the skin disease of sheep caused by Psoroptes ovis is often known locally as sheep scab. This species may affect its hosts severely enough to reduce their gain in weight. Costs to farmers of controlling sheep-scab in Britain were at £8 million (US$12 million) annually in 2005. Transmission between hosts is readily accomplished by contagion during flocking contact and also on fomites such as scraps of sheep's wool because these relatively large and robust mites can survive for one to two weeks off their host. Psoroptes ovis infests the superficial layers of the skin. Irritation of the outer skin by the mite's mouthparts and saliva results in a complex form of cutaneous hypersensitivity and inflammatory exudation of serum and fresh cells. The mites feed on this moist exudate. The skin loses its hair (depilation) at the sites of infestation and this may be extensive. As a result of the movement of the mites into areas of fresh skin, large scabs accumulate on the raw skin left behind. The mites cause intense pruritus (itching). In cases of heavy infestations, the host grooms compulsively, aggravating the depilation, and it may become mentally distressed. Psoroptes ovis infests sheep worldwide and can be a serious welfare and animal-production problem for sheep farmers. Infestations of cattle with mites of the similar genus Chorioptes, in combination with Sarcoptes mite infestation, has been shown to cause a failure to gain body weight by 15.5 to 37.2 kilograms (34 1/8 to 82 lb) over a two-month period compared to cattle without the mites.

==== Psorergatic skin disease ====
Psorergates bovis causes pruritus, but little clinical harm to cattle. In contrast, Psorergates ovis feeding on sheep induces inflammatory and hypersensitive reactions in the epidermis, resulting in intense pruritus and formation of scabs. Further damage to the skin and fleece of sheep occurs when the sheep groom compulsively. Economic loss is incurred by damage and depilation of the wool fleece. This species is prevalent in Australia, New Zealand, southern Africa, and the Americas.

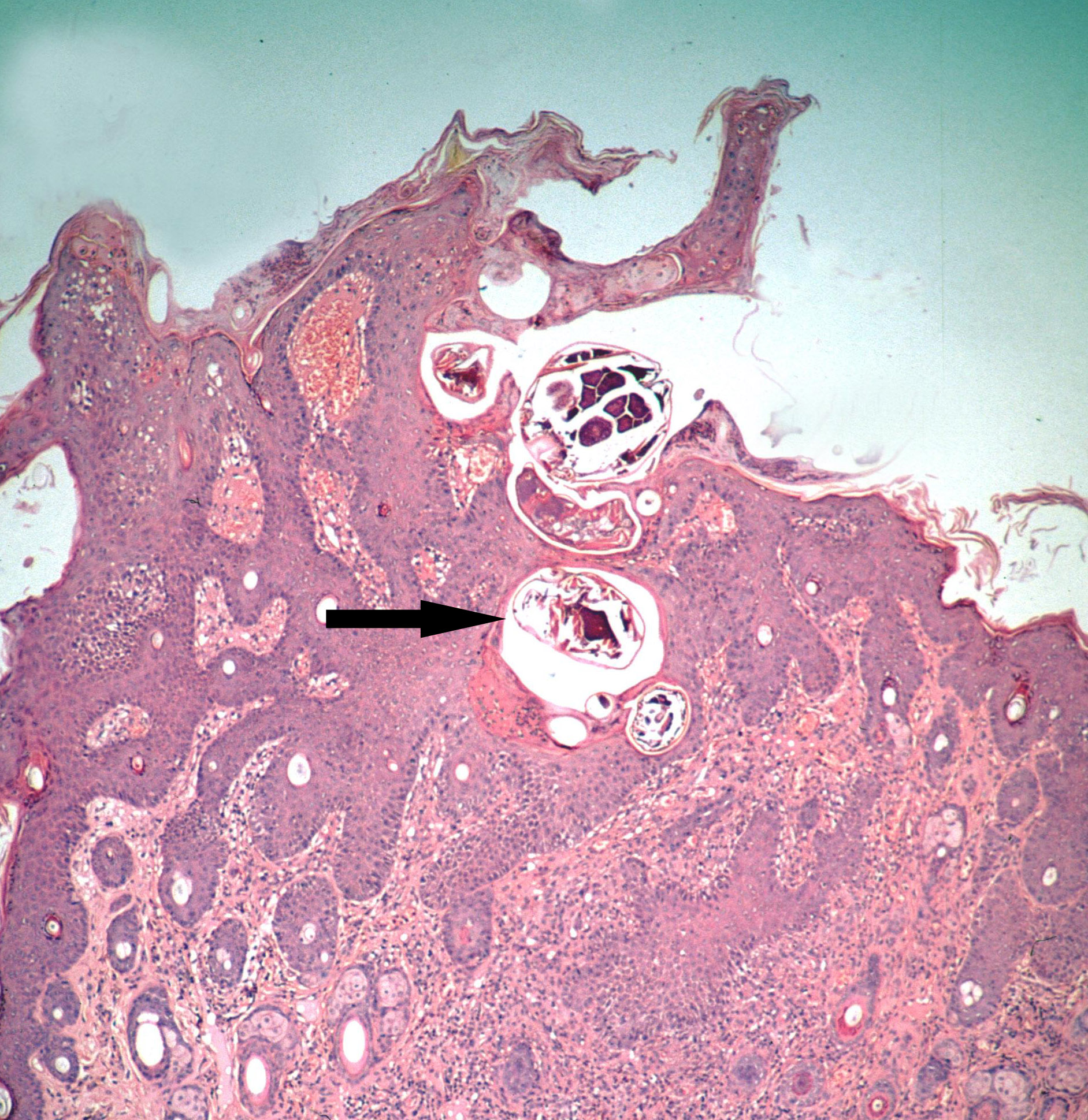
Sarcoptes mites (the dark circular objects) burrowing in epidermis (of tail of a rat host)

==== Sarcoptic skin disease ====
Sarcoptic mites as adults are microscopic, nearly circular in outline, and their legs are short, adapted for burrowing. The females, after mating with males on the surface of their host's skin, burrow into the living layers of the epidermis (mainly the stratum spinosum). They make tunnels horizontal to the surface of the skin. Here, eggs are laid and development of larvae and nymphs occurs. The mites have low mobility and transmission between hosts occurs only during close contact. The feeding of the mites and their excretory products irritates and inflames the skin, causing intense pruritus. Dermal hypersensitivity reactions develop in the host. Chronic infestations lead to thickening of the skin by overproduction of epidermal cells (acanthosis), resulting in a characteristic depilated and scaly appearance. Stress caused by the pruritus can be severe, and will result in 6% to 23% lost productivity of commercially reared pigs. Camels are prone to severe infestation with Sarcoptes.

==== Feather mites ====
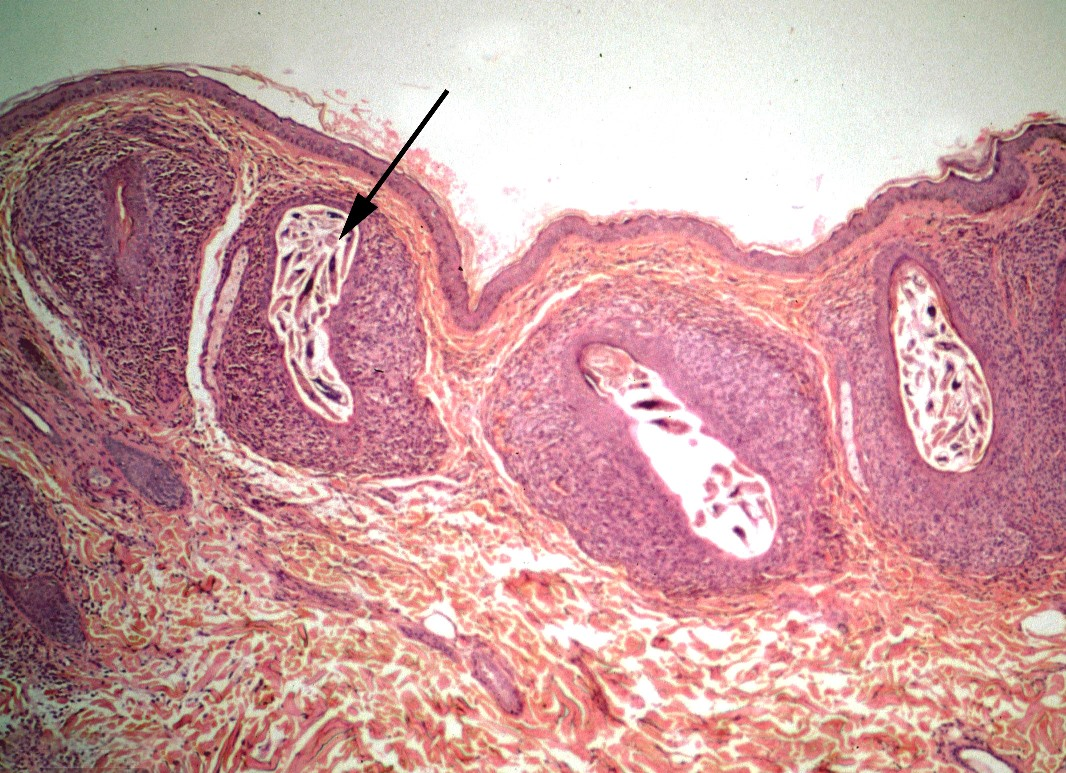
Section through skin infested with Demodex in the hair follicles (arrowed), which are surrounded by infiltration of inflammatory cells

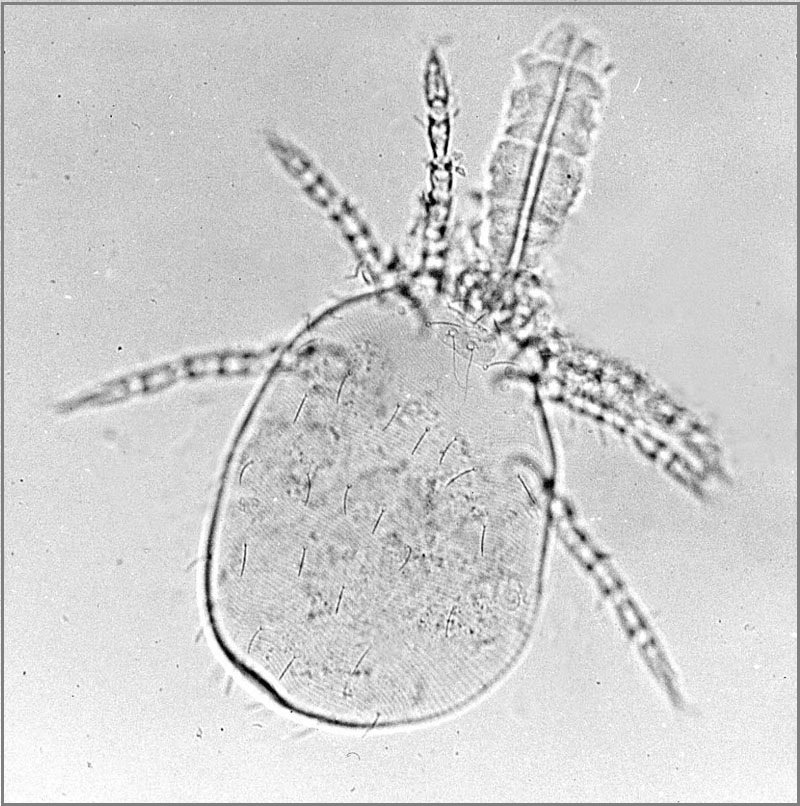
Trombiculid larval mite with a stylostome blood-sucking tube projecting from mouthparts at top right: the larva has only three pairs of legs.

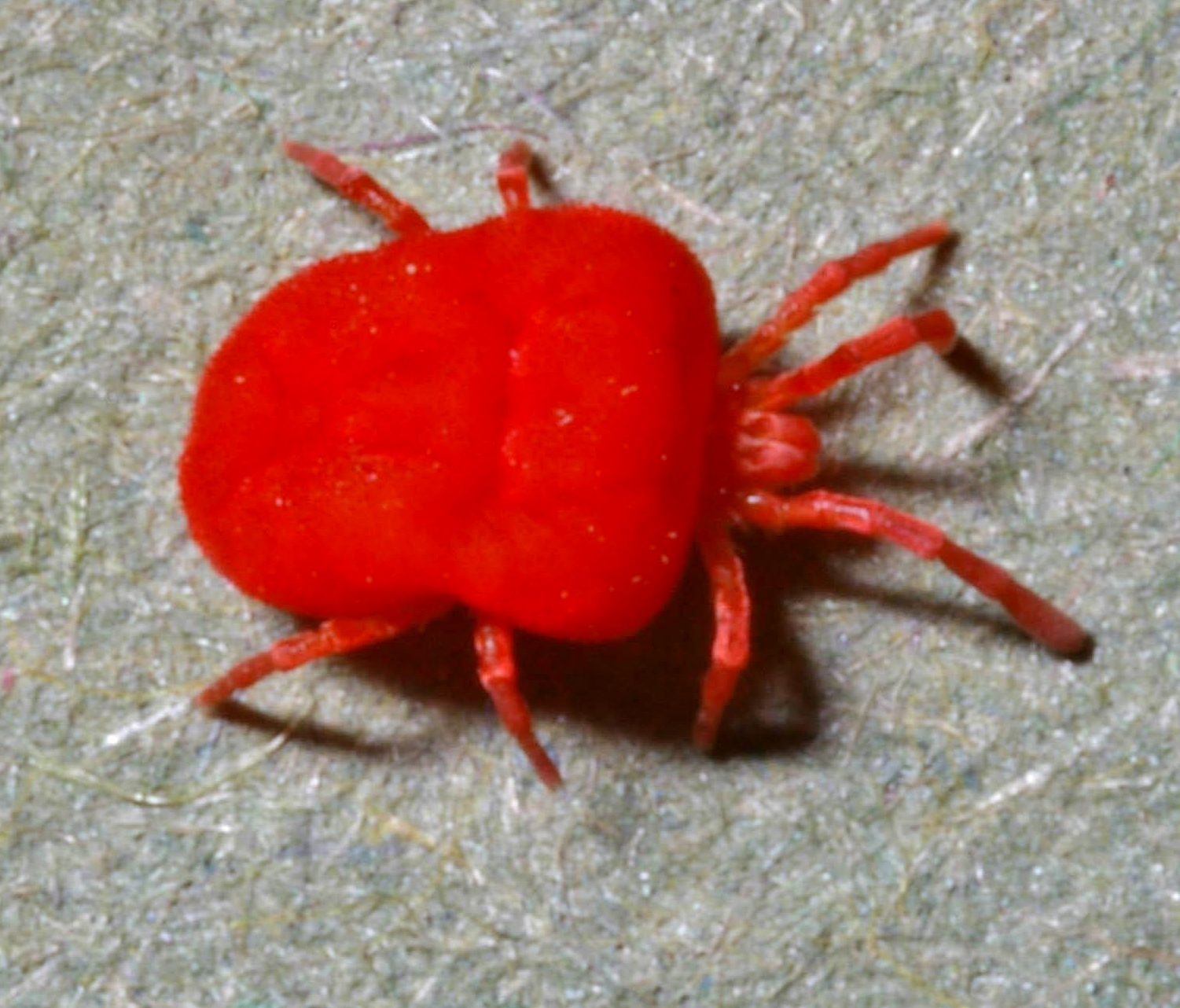
Adult Trombicula autumnalis mite: this stage is predatory.

The irritation caused to birds and poultry can cause loss of condition and production. Megninia ginglymura feeding at the base of feathers of poultry causes a pruritic dermatitis that irritates the birds and induces them to pull their feathers. The stress of the infestation can cause a 20% loss in egg production.

=== Mites found in deeper layers of skin or within other organs ===
==== Demodecosis ====
Demodecosis in cattle caused by Demodex bovis can occur as dense, localized infestations with inflammation of the epidermis in hair follicles. This leads to pustular folliculitis and indurated (thickened) plaques within the skin. On cattle, these localized foci of infestation can become so large as to be clearly visible externally. The value of the hides from cattle infested this way is reduced. Pigs may be similarly affected by infestations with Demodex.

==== Lung mites and mites of other tissues ====
The mites of the Cytoditidae and Laminosioptidae invade the respiratory system, and then other tissues, of their hosts. Cytodites nudus infests poultry worldwide; although slight infestations cause little clinical harm, when infestation becomes heavy in individual birds, they can be severely weakened or die. Laminosioptes cysticola infests poultry where it accumulates in nodules that occur in the facia of subcutaneous muscle and also in the lungs. This causes little clinical harm to the birds, but devalues their meat intended for human consumption.

=== Blood feeding ===
Larvae of trombiculids cause severe pruritus to their hosts after they detach. The larva secretes a proteinaceous feeding tube, the stylostome, into the host's skin. This remains after the larva has completed engorgement on blood and induces an intense localized inflammation. Eutrombicula alfreddugesi and E. splendens are common in the Americas where they infest the skin of the face, muzzle, legs, and belly of cattle and horses. (Trombiculid mites also leave intensely pruritic spots on dogs and humans after feeding and such infestation is closely associated with the grassland and scrub habitats of the nonparasitic stages of the lifecycle.)

Dense infestations of a poultry house by Dermanyssus gallinae lead to biting stress and loss of production of the birds (also humans working in the poultry houses are bitten). Originally a parasite centered on the nests of its wild bird hosts, this species has become a major pest in commercial poultry houses. Ornithonyssus bursa and O. sylvarium cause similar problems to poultry production.

== Mites as transmitters of microorganisms ==
Parasitic mites are less commonly involved than ticks and parasitic insects in transmitting pathogenic microorganisms to livestock species because fewer types of them feed directly on blood. However, the dermanyssid mites blood-feeding on birds can be transmitters (same as the term vector in this context) of microorganisms. Dermanyssus gallinae has been shown to transmit between chickens the virus causing St Louis encephalitis (the main transmitters of this virus to humans are Culex mosquitoes). Dermanyssid mites are also implicated in the transmission to poultry birds of the bacterial agent of avian spirochaetosis, Borrelia anserina, but the main transmitters of this bacterium are argasid ticks. (Trombiculid mites are notorious as transmitters of Orientia tsutsugamushi, the bacterium that causes scrub typhus in humans in Southeast Asia.)

== Control of infestations ==
=== Pesticide treatments ===
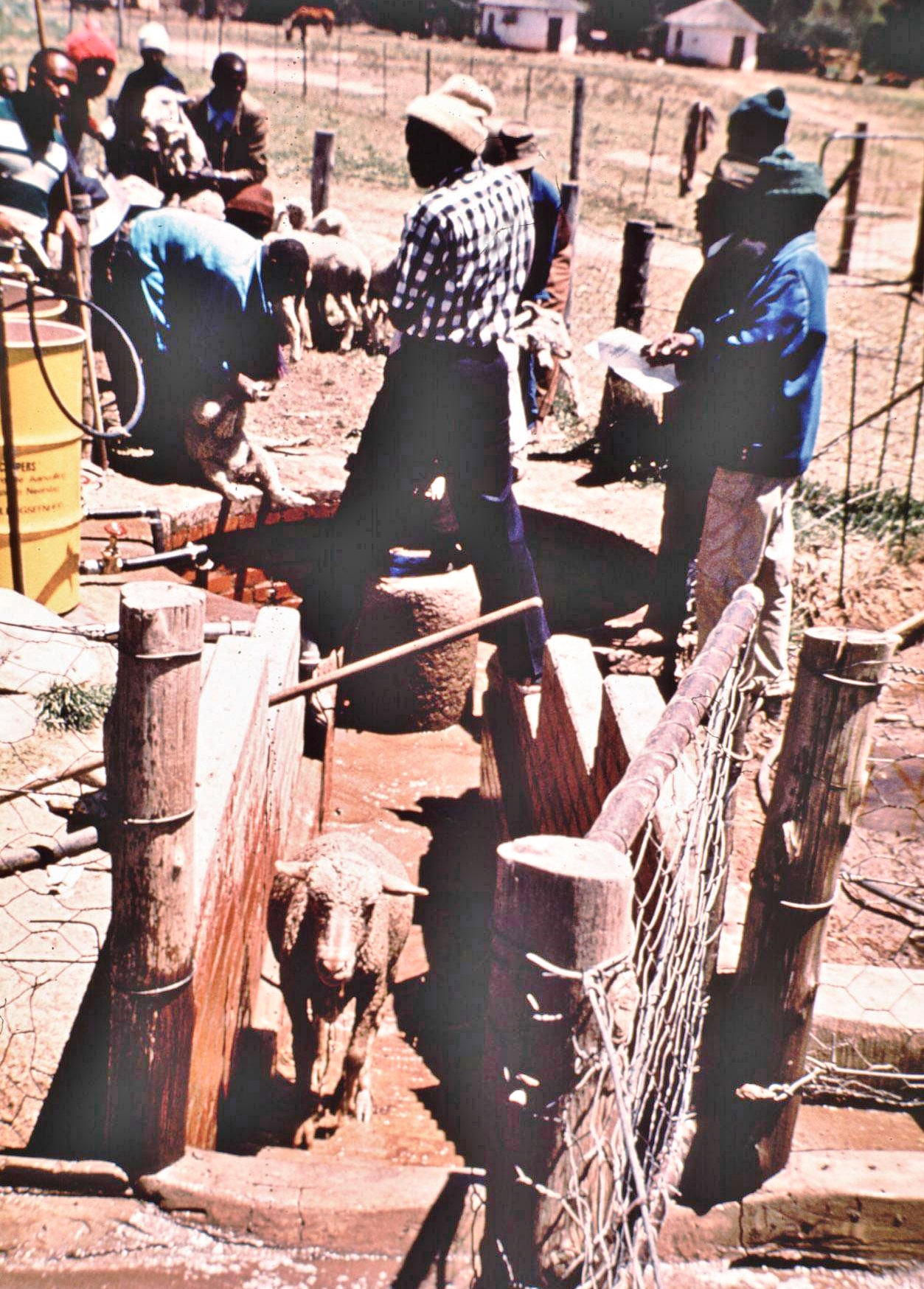
Dipping sheep to control Psoroptes mites and other ectoparasites

Psoroptes mites infesting sheep are controlled by application of synthetic chemicals formulated for killing mites and ticks (acaricides, or more generally ectoparasiticides). These can be applied as aqueous washes in dipping baths, or as pour-on preparations in an oily formulation that spreads over the skin. Dip baths used to be commonly used for applying acaricides to sheep (also cattle). However, alternatives such as hand-held sprayers and pour-on applicators are now often used to reduce costs and risk of contamination associated with running a dip tank. Formamidine and synthetic pyrethroid acaricides such as amitraz and flumethrin, respectively, are often used.

A more direct way of treating some types of mite are antiparasitic drugs that act systemically through the internal circulation of the animal rather than topically on the skin. The avermectin drugs such as ivermectin are used as acaricides against deeply feeding mites such as Sarcoptes and Demodex species. The drugs are delivered orally or parenterally. They can also be effective against surface-feeders such as Psoroptes species. Botanical pesticides derived directly from plants such as the neem tree (source of the active ingredient, azadirachtin) are an alternative to commercial chemical pesticides.

=== Biological control, management, and hygiene ===
Fungi such as Metarhizium anisopliae and Beauveria bassiana that are naturally pathogenic to mites are subjects of research as an alternative to chemical pesticides. The fungi infest the surface of the cuticle and penetrate into it, smothering the mites. Self-dusting by birds is a natural defense against mites (and lice) and can be aided by poultry farmers providing diatomaceous earth (also known as kaolin). The harsh dust of the diatomaceous earth abrades the cuticle of the mites, dehydrating them fatally.

Some mites of domestic animals have stages of their lifecycle in the general environment or the nesting places of their hosts, typically the dermanyssid mites. Control is done by cleaning and disinfection of these sites, or by using traps for the mites. Psoroptes mites of sheep can survive for several weeks on fomites of wool on structures of pens and transport trucks, so cleaning and disinfecting these structures reduces infestation.

Vaccination against some species of mites has been tested experimentally. The sheep-scab mite Psoroptes ovis is the target for such control because of its wide distribution, serious economic importance, and because it feeds on inflammatory exudate which contains antibodies reactive against antigens in the mite's gut. The rationale for such vaccination follows invention of a commercial synthetic antigen vaccine against the tropical cattle tick, Rhipicephalus microplus.

== Gallery ==
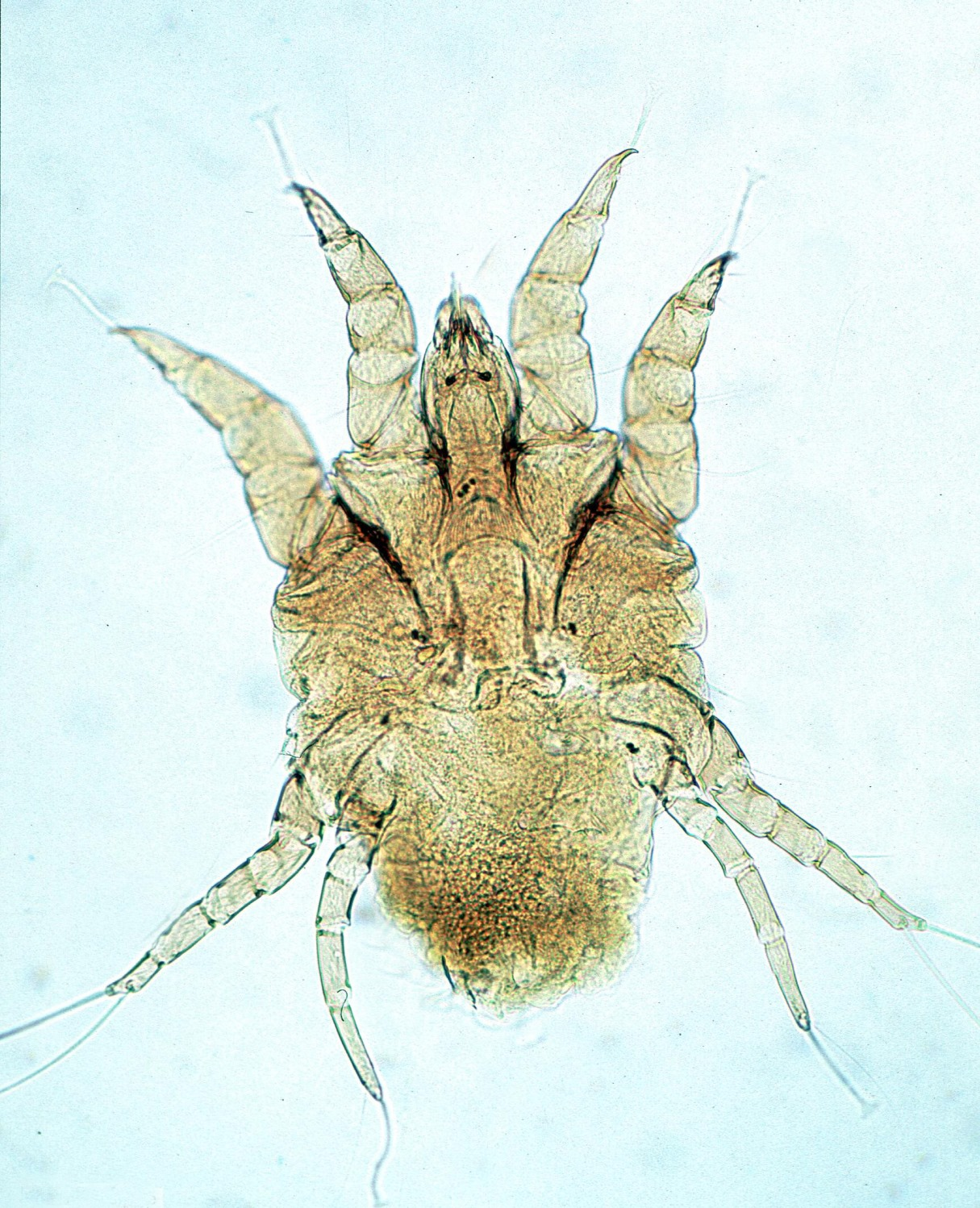
Psoroptes cuniculi surface-feeding mite

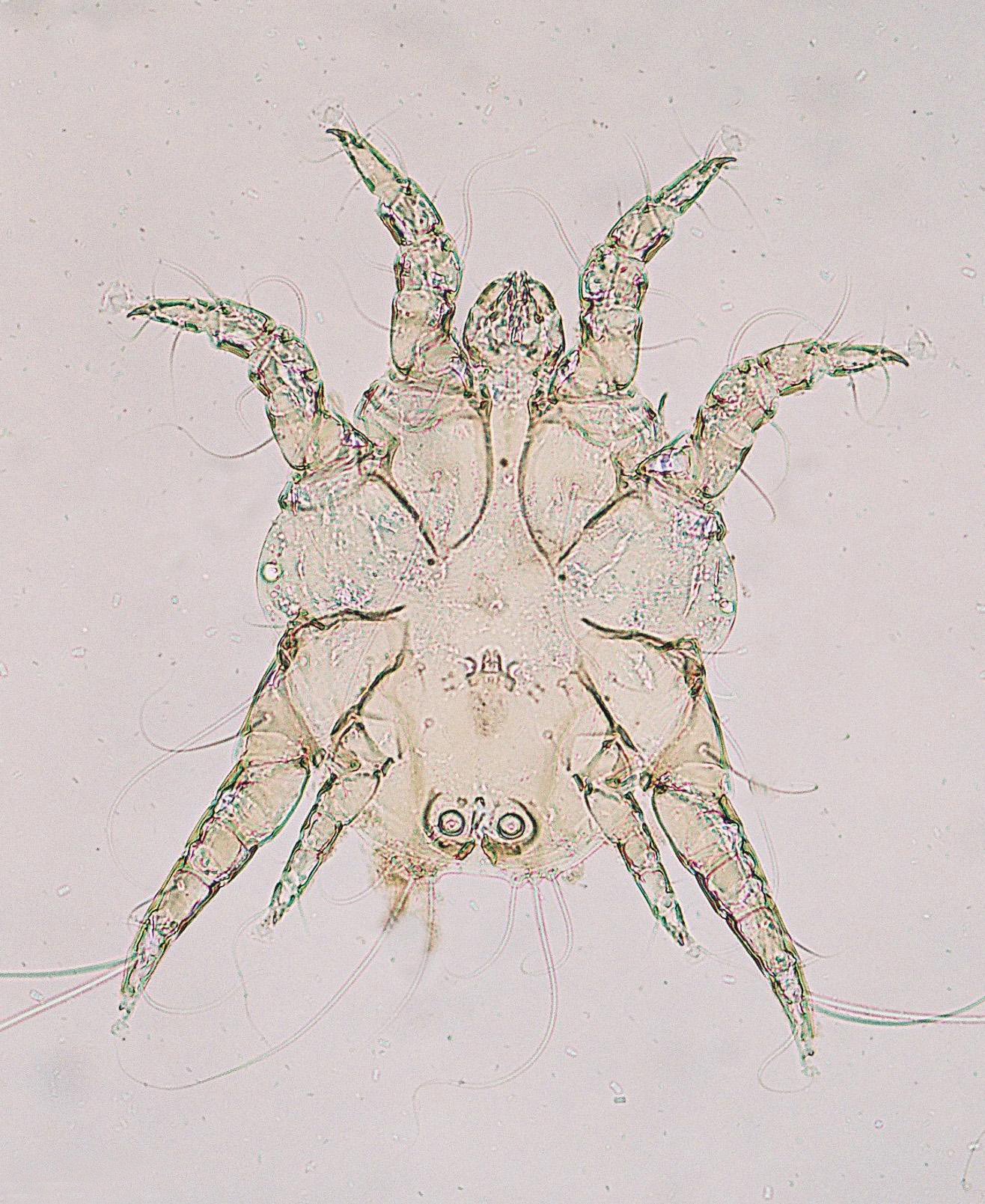
Chorioptes bovis surface-feeding mite

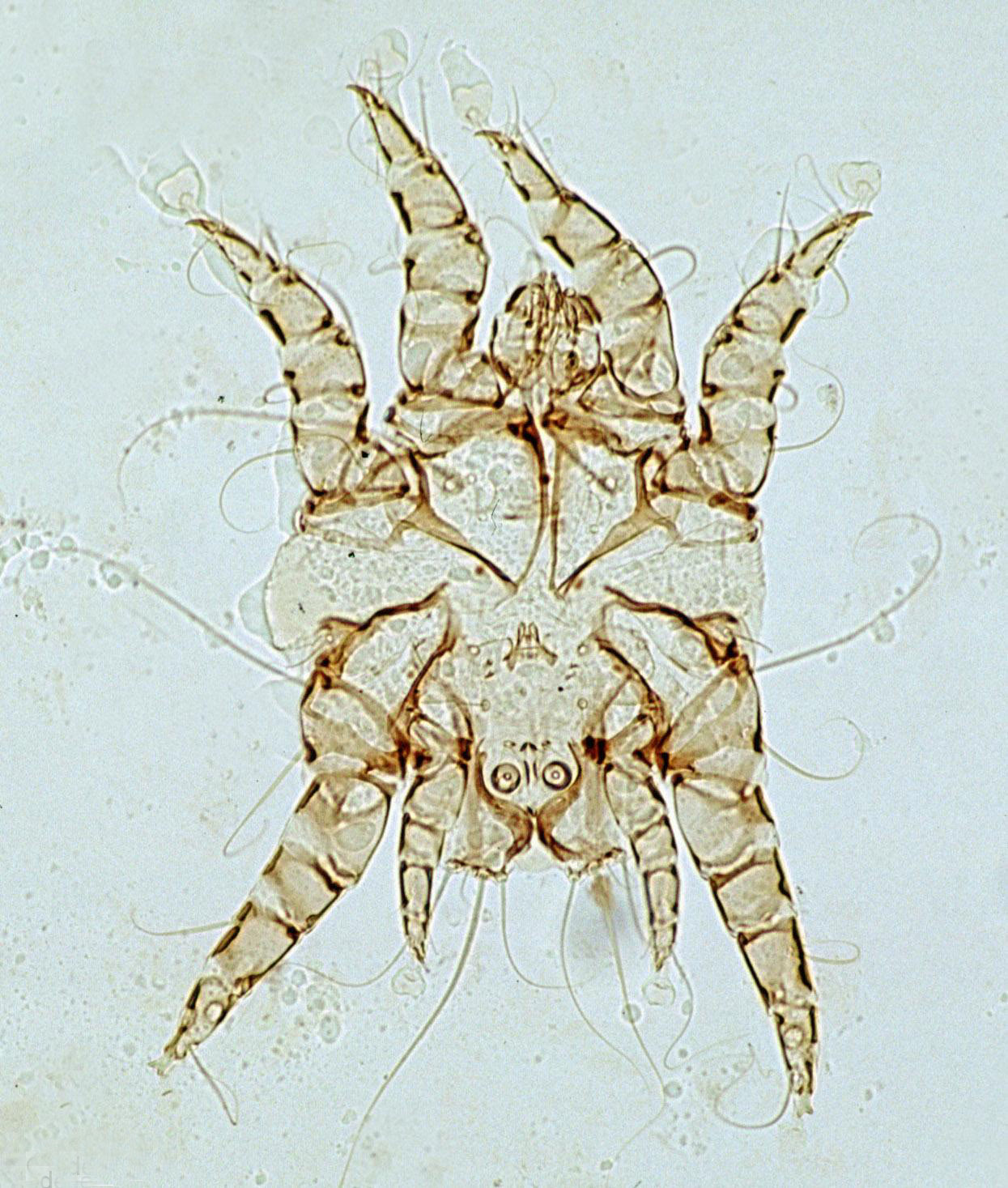
Otodectes surface-feeding mite causing ear canker

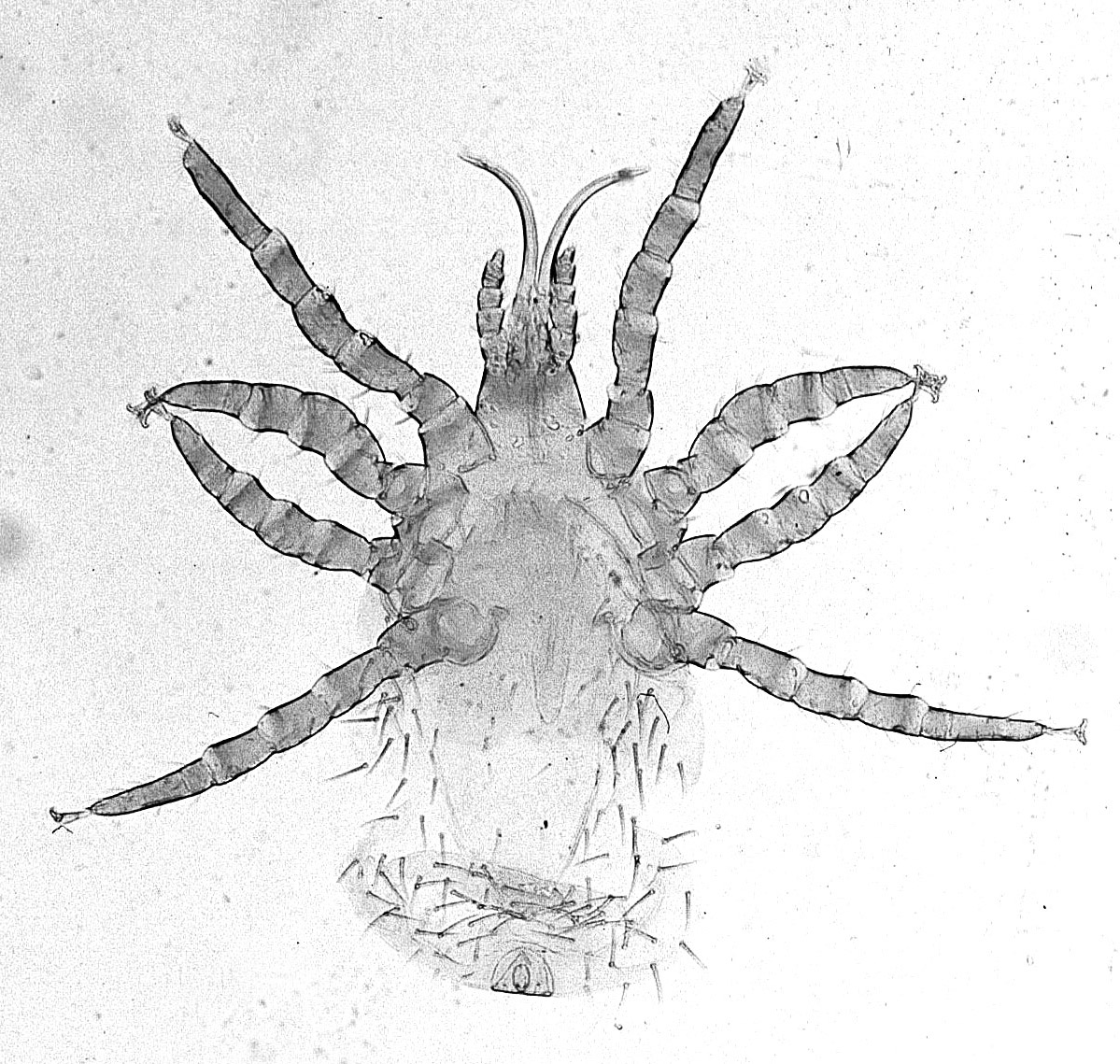
Ornithonyssus bird mite

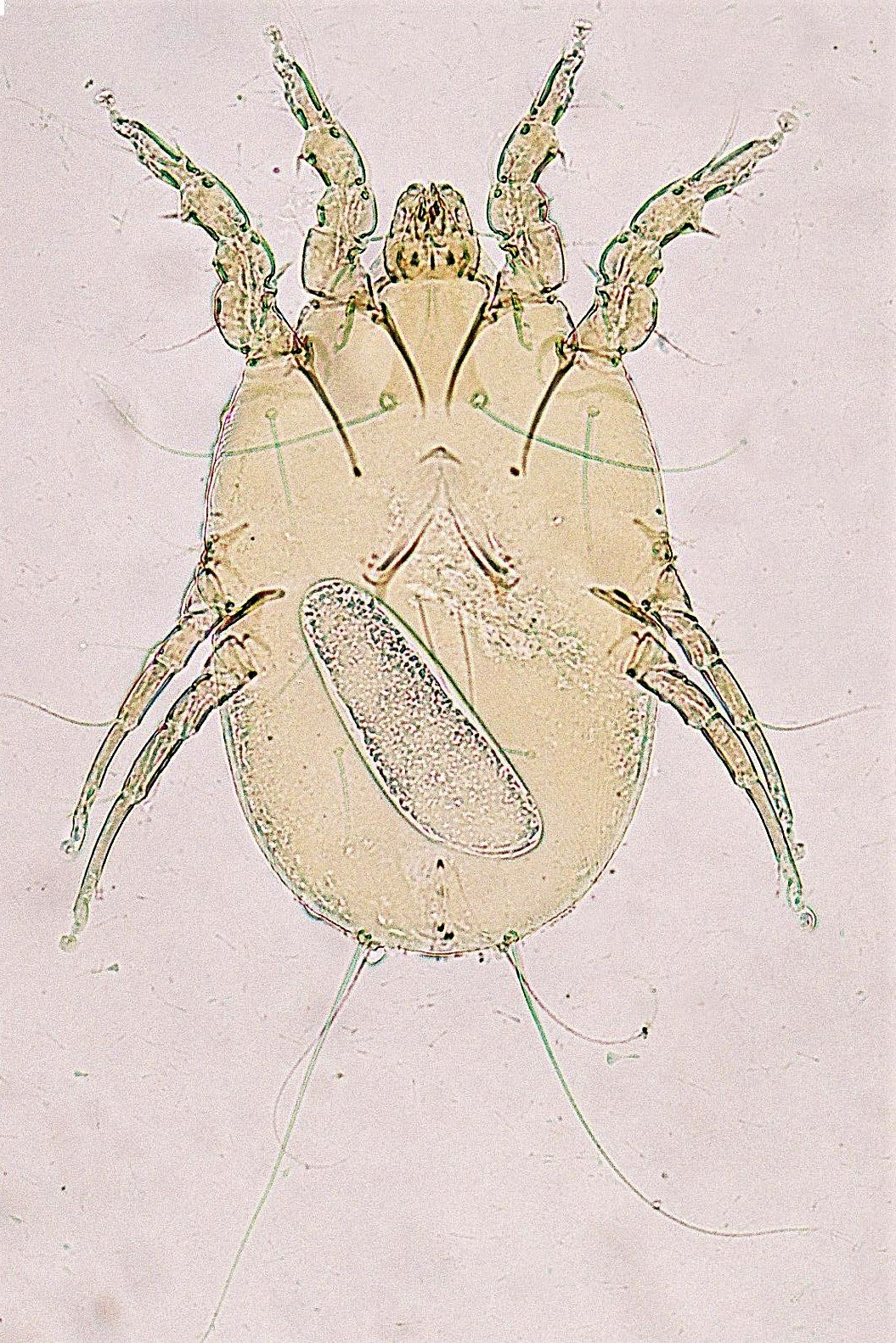
Megninia feather mite of birds (the oval object is an egg)

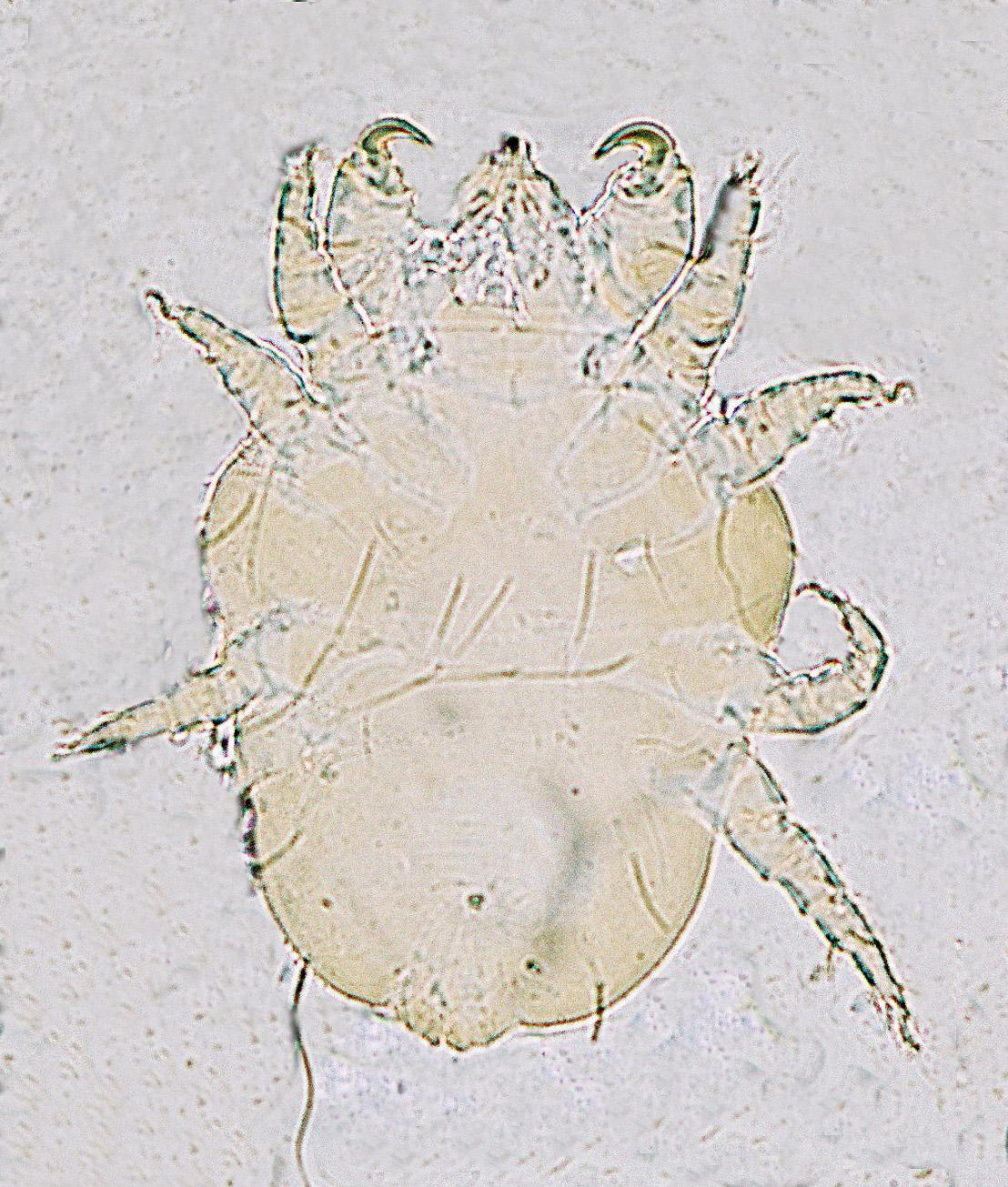
Cheyletiella parasitivorax house dust mite

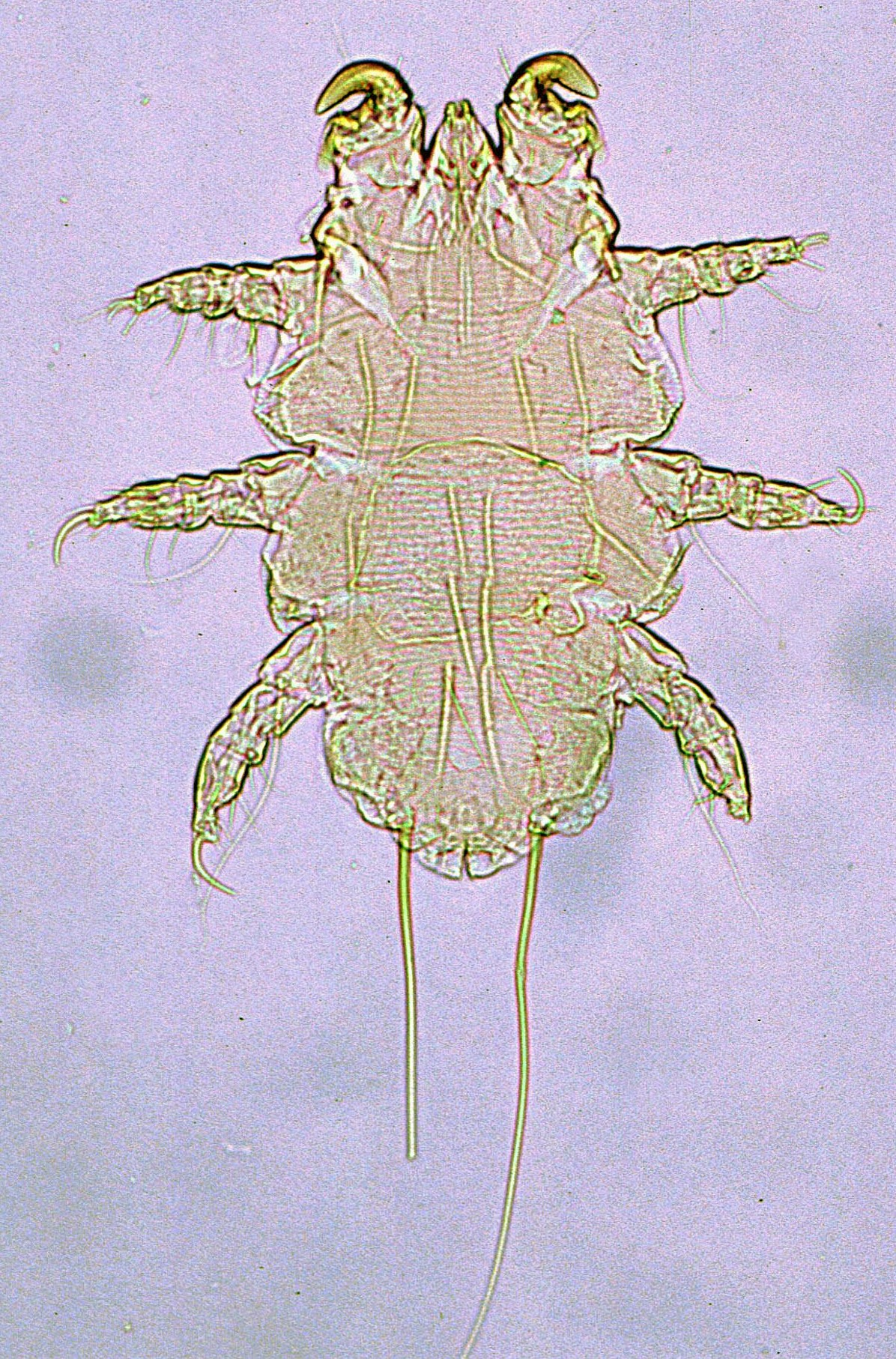
Myobia musculi rodent fur mite

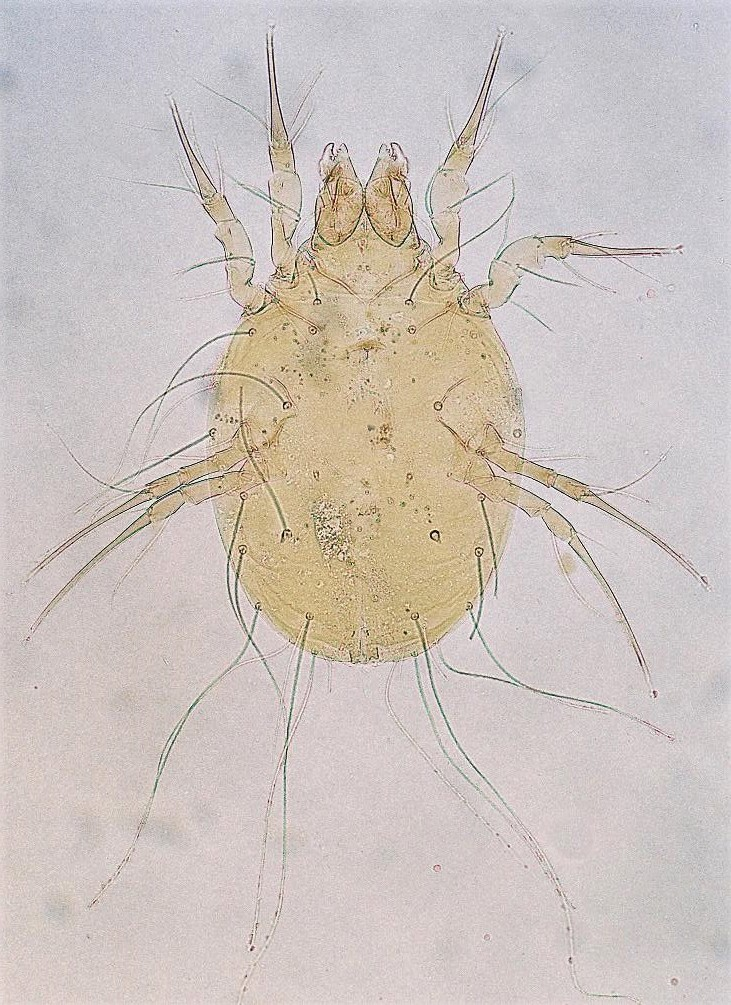
Glycyphagus grain mite, cause of allergy
