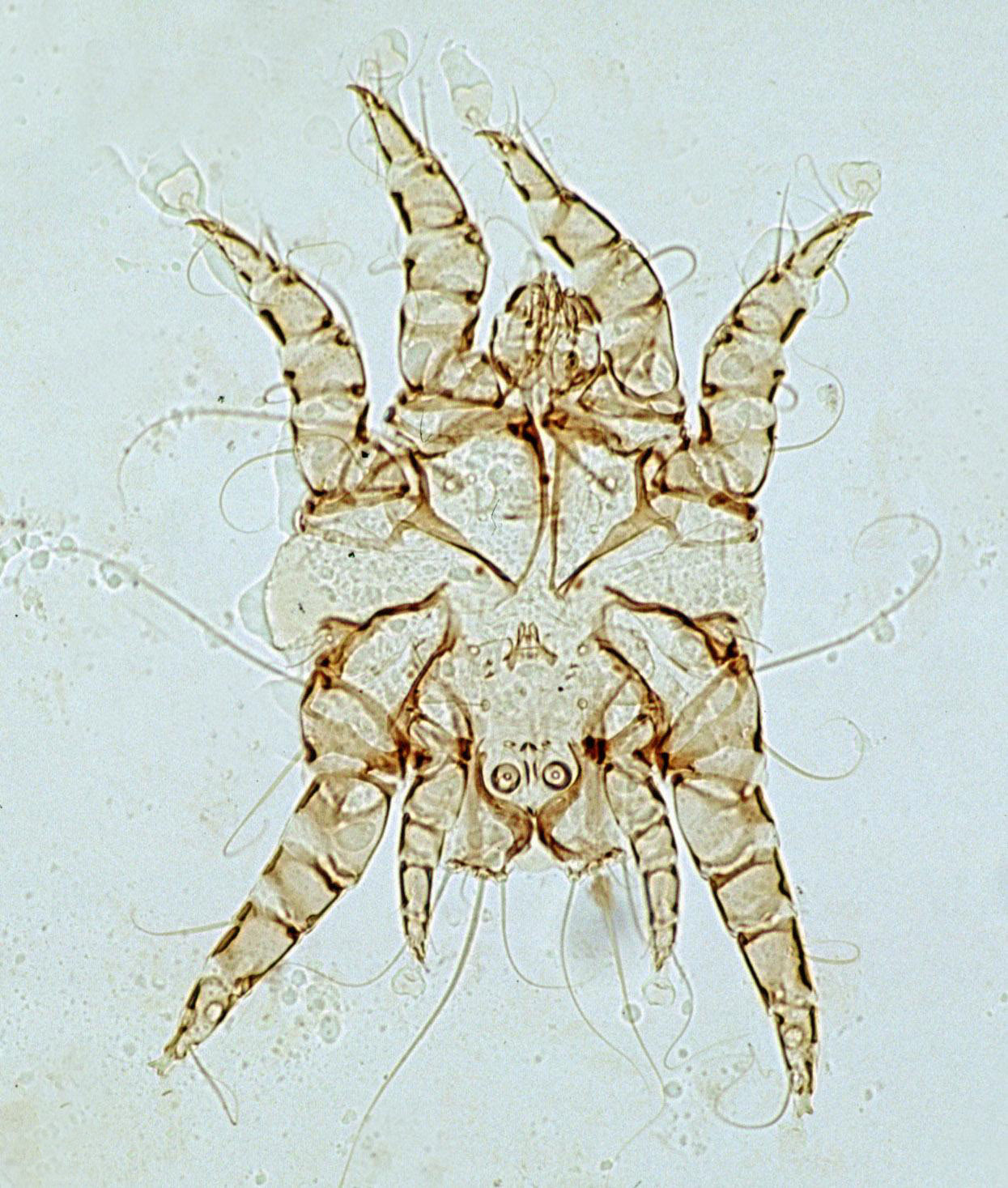
- Otodectes ear mite

Scientific classification
- Domain: Eukaryota
- Kingdom: Animalia
- Phylum: Arthropoda
- Subphylum: Chelicerata
- Class: Arachnida
- Order: Sarcoptiformes
- Family: Psoroptidae
- Genus: Otodectes
- Species: O. cynotis

Binomial name
- Otodectes cynotis Hering, 1838

= Otodectes =

Genus of mites

Otodectes is a genus of parasitic mite in the superfamily Psoroptidae (the biting cohort of the Sarcoptiformes order of mites). There is a single species of mite in this genus, Otodectes cynotis. This mite is within the class Arachnida and subclass Acari for mites and ticks. Otodectes are external parasites (ectoparasites) of dogs, cats and ferrets, but can be found on many other mammals. Otodectes is found worldwide.

The mite is 0.4 mm (0.016 in) in size, approximately the size of a grain of salt, and can be seen with the naked eye. It lives in the external ear canal of its host, and causes intense irritation leading to otitis externa.

The lifecycle of O. cynotis takes approximately three weeks.

Otodectes cynotis is typically spread by direct contact with infected species and does not have evidence of living in the environment for transmission.

== Etymology ==
New Latin Otodectes is from Greek prefix "ωτο- (ōto-)" meaning "ear" and the Greek word "δήκτης (dēktēs)" meaning "beggar."
