= ATCvet code QP54 =

ATCvet code QP54 Endectocides is a therapeutic subgroup of the Anatomical Therapeutic Chemical Classification System for veterinary medicinal products, a system of alphanumeric codes developed by the World Health Organization (WHO) for the classification of drugs and other medical products for veterinary use. Subgroup QP54 is part of the anatomical group QP Antiparasitic products, insecticides and repellents.

National versions of the ATC classification may include additional codes not present in this list, which follows the WHO version.

== QP54A Macrocyclic lactones ==
=== QP54AA Avermectins ===
QP54AA01 Ivermectin
QP54AA02 Abamectin
QP54AA03 Doramectin
QP54AA04 Eprinomectin
QP54AA05 Selamectin
QP54AA06 Emamectin
QP54AA51 Ivermectin, combinations
QP54AA52 Abamectin, combinations
QP54AA54 Eprinomectin, combinations
QP54AA55 Selamectin, combinations

=== QP54AB Milbemycins ===
QP54AB01 Milbemycin oxime
QP54AB02 Moxidectin
QP54AB51 Milbemycin oxime, combinations
QP54AB52 Moxidectin, combinations

=== QP54AX Other macrocyclic lactones ===
Empty group
