= Eprinomectin =

Veterinary anti-parasitic medication

Eprinomectin B1a

Clinical data
- Trade names: Eprinex
- Other names: MK-397, 4"-epi-acetylamino-4"-deoxy-avermectin B1a (4"R)-4"-(acetylamino)-5-O-demethyl-4"-deoxyavermectin A1a
- License data: US DailyMed: Eprinomectin
- Routes of administration: Topical
- ATCvet code: QP54AA04 (WHO)

Legal status
- Legal status: US: OTC

Pharmacokinetic data
- Bioavailability: 29%
- Protein binding: >99%
- Onset of action: 24 hours
- Elimination half-life: 8–36 days
- Duration of action: 7–10 days
- Excretion: Feces (17–19.8%), urine (0.35%), milk (0.32–0.54%)

Identifiers
- IUPAC name: N-[(2S,3R,4S,6S)-6-[(2S,3S,4S,6R)-6-[(1'R,2R,3S,4'S,6S,8'R,10'E,12'S,13'S,14'E,16'E,20'R,21'R,24'S)-2-[(2S)-butan-2-yl]-21',24'-dihydroxy-3,11',13',22'-tetramethyl-2'-oxospiro[2,3-dihydropyran-6,6'-3,7,19-trioxatetracyclo[15.6.1.14,8.020,24]pentacosa-10,14,16,22-tetraene]-12'-yl]oxy-4-methoxy-2-methyloxan-3-yl]oxy-4-methoxy-2-methyloxan-3-yl]acetamide
- CAS Number: 133305-88-1
- PubChem CID: 6444397
- ChemSpider: 16736607
- UNII: 00OY54D31C
- KEGG: D04037
- CompTox Dashboard (EPA): DTXSID8037542

Chemical and physical data
- Formula: C_{50}H_{75}NO_{14}
- Molar mass: 914.143 g·mol^{−1}
- 3D model (JSmol): Interactive image
- SMILES: CC[C@H](C)[C@@H]1[C@H](C=C[C@@]2(O1)C[C@@H]3C[C@H](O2)C/C=C(/[C@H]([C@H](/C=C/C=C/4\CO[C@H]5[C@@]4([C@@H](C=C([C@H]5O)C)C(=O)O3)O)C)O[C@H]6C[C@@H]([C@H]([C@@H](O6)C)O[C@H]7C[C@@H]([C@@H]([C@@H](O7)C)NC(=O)C)OC)OC)\C)C
- InChI: InChI=1S/C50H75NO14/c1-12-26(2)45-29(5)18-19-49(65-45)24-36-21-35(64-49)17-16-28(4)44(27(3)14-13-15-34-25-58-47-43(53)30(6)20-37(48(54)61-36)50(34,47)55)62-41-23-39(57-11)46(32(8)60-41)63-40-22-38(56-10)42(31(7)59-40)51-33(9)52/h13-16,18-20,26-27,29,31-32,35-47,53,55H,12,17,21-25H2,1-11H3,(H,51,52)/b14-13+,28-16+,34-15+/t26-,27-,29-,31-,32-,35+,36-,37-,38-,39-,40-,41-,42+,43+,44-,45+,46-,47+,49+,50+/m0/s1; Key:ZKWQQXZUCOBISE-CRTGXIDZSA-N

Eprinomectin B1b

Clinical data
- Other names: 4"-epi-acetylamino-4"-deoxy-avermectin B1b
- ATC code: P54AA04 (WHO)

Identifiers
- IUPAC name: N-[(2S,3R,4S,6S)-6-[(2S,3S,4S,6R)-6-[(1'R,2R,3S,4'S,6S,8'R,10'E,12'S,13'S,14'E,16'E,20'R,21'R,24'S)-21',24'-dihydroxy-3,11',13',22'-tetramethyl-2'-oxo-2-propan-2-ylspiro[2,3-dihydropyran-6,6'-3,7,19-trioxatetracyclo[15.6.1.14,8.020,24]pentacosa-10,14,16,22-tetraene]-12'-yl]oxy-4-methoxy-2-methyloxan-3-yl]oxy-4-methoxy-2-methyloxan-3-yl]acetamide
- CAS Number: 133305-89-2
- PubChem CID: 20055319
- ChemSpider: 16736608
- UNII: 31OML2QZ0Q
- KEGG: D04037
- CompTox Dashboard (EPA): DTXSID8037542

Chemical and physical data
- Formula: C_{49}H_{73}NO_{14}
- Molar mass: 900.116 g·mol^{−1}
- 3D model (JSmol): Interactive image
- SMILES: C[C@H]1/C=C/C=C/2\CO[C@H]3[C@@]2([C@@H](C=C([C@H]3O)C)C(=O)O[C@H]4C[C@@H](C/C=C(/[C@H]1O[C@H]5C[C@@H]([C@H]([C@@H](O5)C)O[C@H]6C[C@@H]([C@@H]([C@@H](O6)C)NC(=O)C)OC)OC)\C)O[C@]7(C4)C=C[C@@H]([C@H](O7)C(C)C)C)O
- InChI: InChI=1S/C49H73NO14/c1-25(2)43-28(5)17-18-48(64-43)23-35-20-34(63-48)16-15-27(4)44(26(3)13-12-14-33-24-57-46-42(52)29(6)19-36(47(53)60-35)49(33,46)54)61-40-22-38(56-11)45(31(8)59-40)62-39-21-37(55-10)41(30(7)58-39)50-32(9)51/h12-15,17-19,25-26,28,30-31,34-46,52,54H,16,20-24H2,1-11H3,(H,50,51)/b13-12+,27-15+,33-14+/t26-,28-,30-,31-,34+,35-,36-,37-,38-,39-,40-,41+,42+,43+,44-,45-,46+,48+,49+/m0/s1; Key:WPNHOHPRXXCPRA-FZTOWWROSA-N

Eprinomectin is an avermectin used as a veterinary topical endectocide. It is a mixture of two chemical compounds, eprinomectin B1a and B1b.
