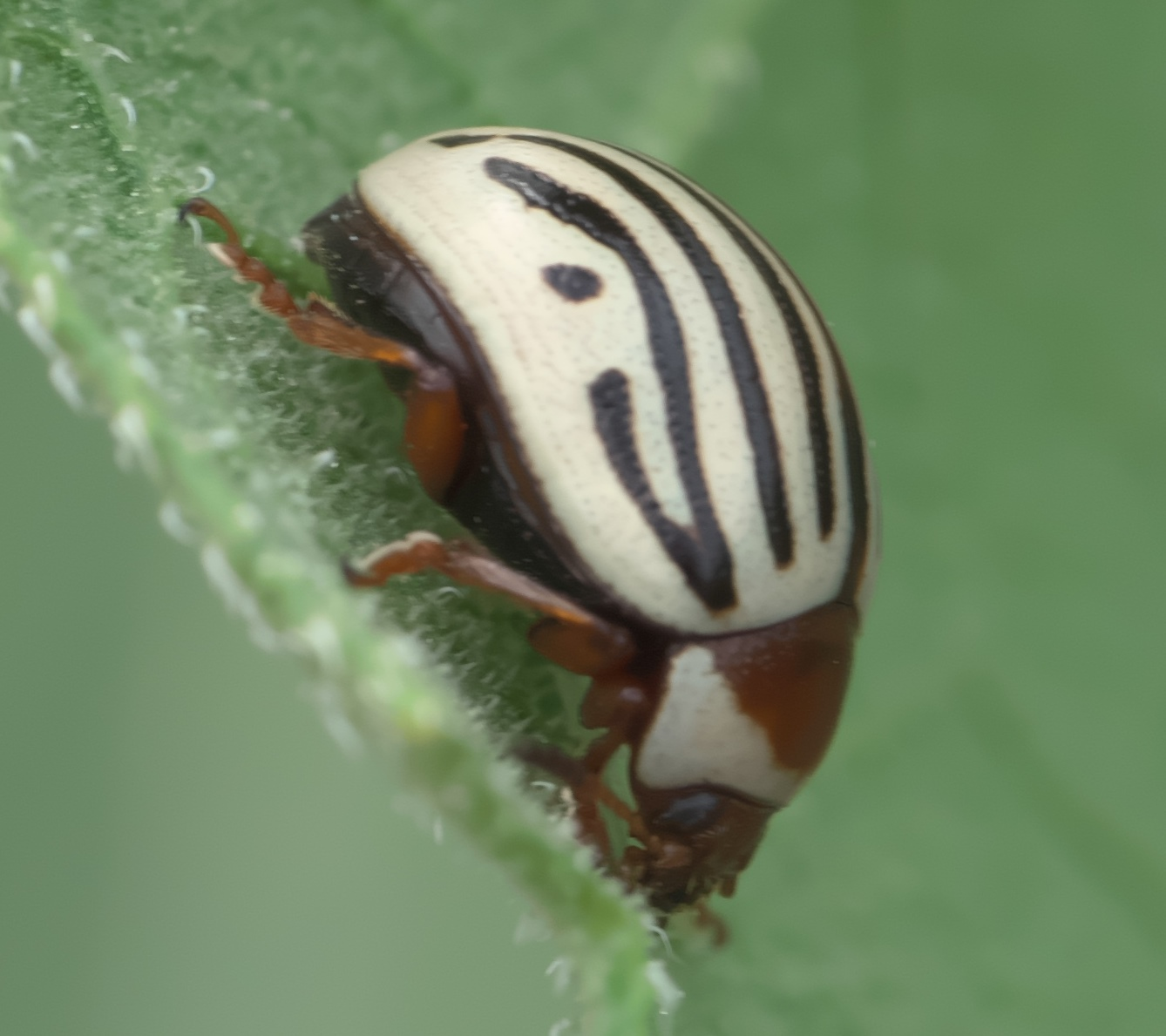

Scientific classification
- Kingdom: Animalia
- Phylum: Arthropoda
- Clade: Pancrustacea
- Class: Insecta
- Order: Coleoptera
- Suborder: Polyphaga
- Infraorder: Cucujiformia
- Family: Chrysomelidae
- Subfamily: Chrysomelinae
- Tribe: Chrysomelini
- Genus: Calligrapha
- Species: C. exclamationis

Binomial name
- Calligrapha exclamationis (Fabricius, 1798)

= Calligrapha exclamationis =

Species of beetle

Calligrapha exclamationis, commonly known as the sunflower beetle, is a species of leaf beetle belonging to the family Chrysomelidae, in the subgenus Zygogramma, which was formerly a genus. It is regarded as a pest of sunflower crops in North America.

== Description ==
C. exclamationis is a small leaf beetle, 6–12 mm in length, 2–4 mm wide, with a brown pronotum and yellow elytra marked with three, elongated brown stripes and a single, shorter, lateral stripe ending at the middle of the wing in a small dot that resembles an exclamation point. This arrangement bears similarities to the exclamation mark from where this species gets its Latin name. Adult beetles are morphological similar to the Colorado potato beetle, a pest of potato crops.

The larvae are humpbacked in appearance, yellow-green in colour, and may measure 0.35 inches (8.9 mm) in length at maturity.

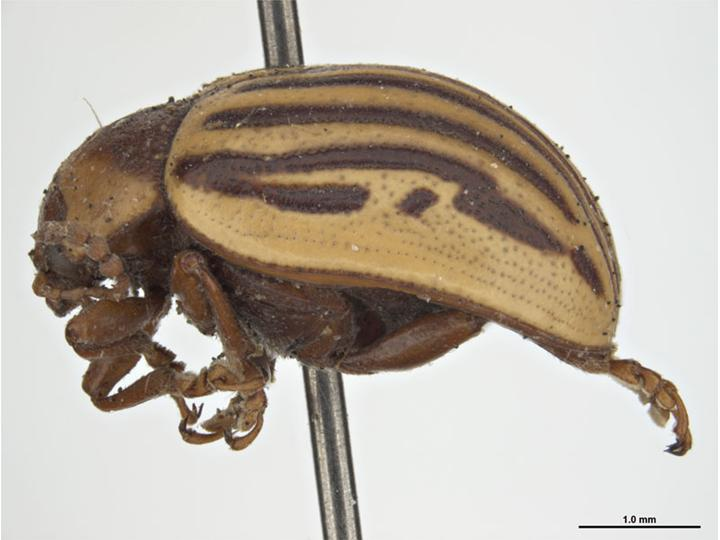
Lateral view

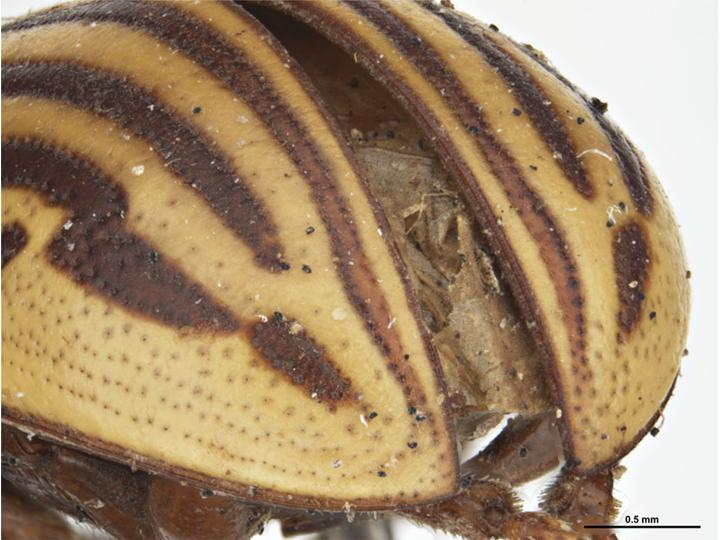
Posterior view

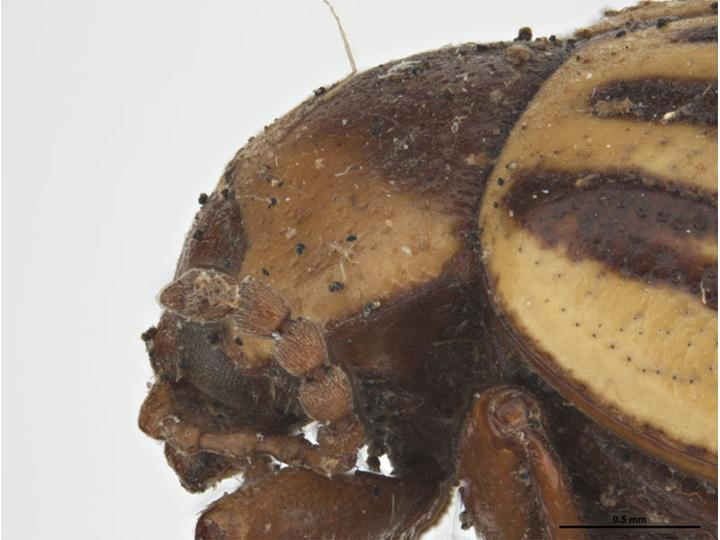
Head (side)

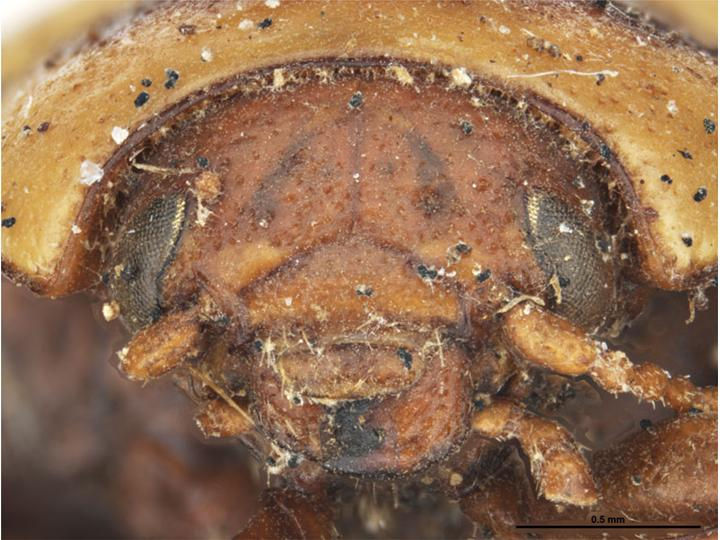
Head (front)

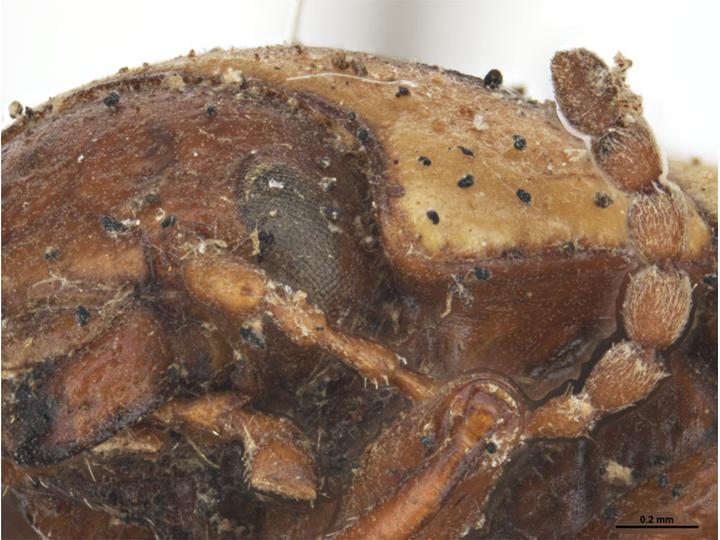
Antenna

== Distribution and habitat ==
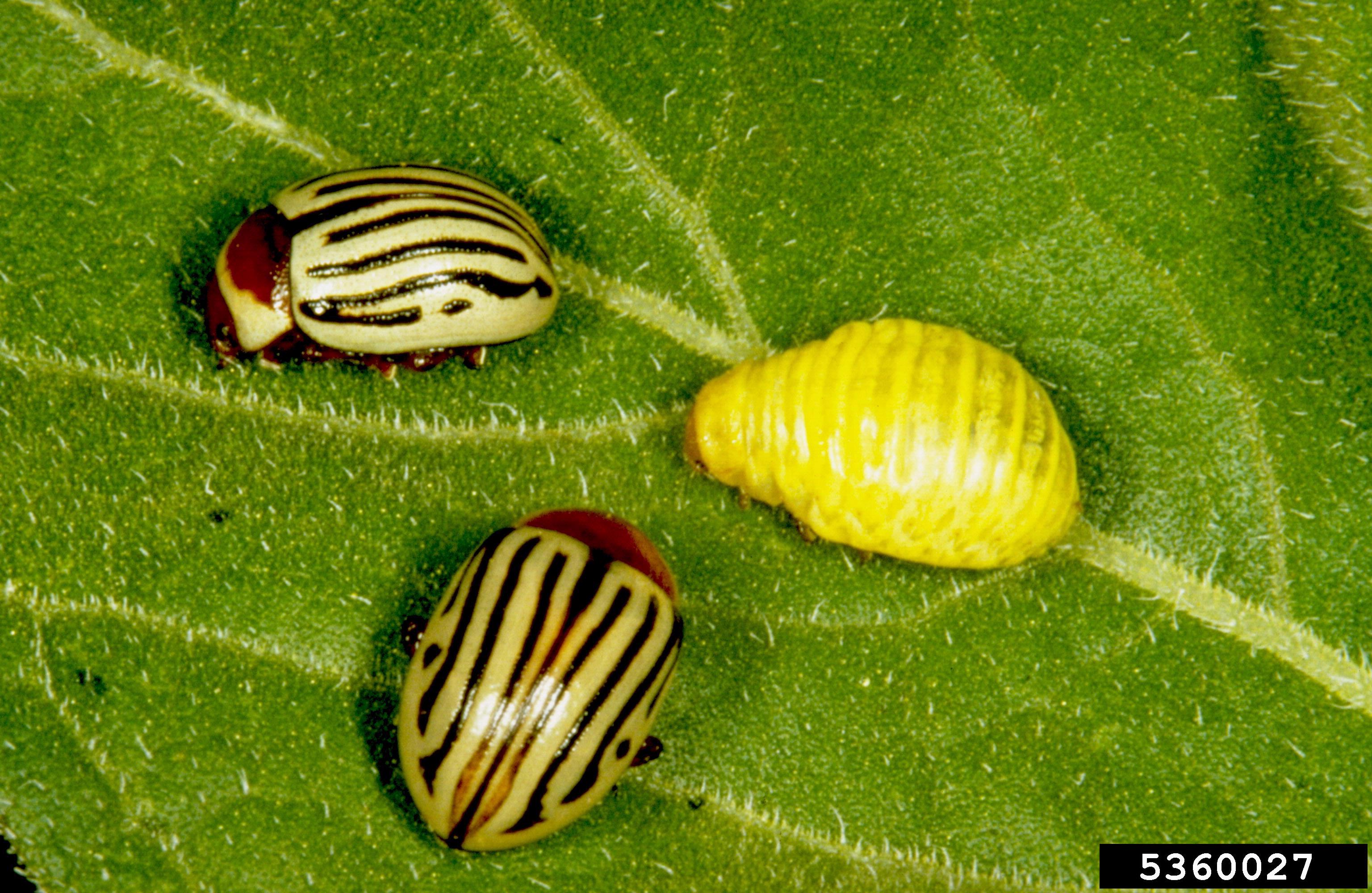
Two adults and a larva of Calligrapha exclamationis

C. exclamationis is native to North America. Adult beetles are phytophagous and associated with the sunflower species Helianthus annuus (common sunflower), H. giganteus (giant sunflower), and H. petiolaris (prairie sunflower). It is a major economic pest to sunflower production in North America.

== Life cycle ==
Overwintering adults emerge in late May or early June. Shortly after emergence, the beetles begin to feed, mate and lay eggs singly on stems and undersides of leaves. Adults live for about 8 weeks and are capable of laying eggs for most of this period. Each female lays approximately 850 eggs, with a range of 200 to 2,000 eggs. Eggs hatch into larvae after about one week; the young larvae feed on the leaves at night. They hide among the bracts of the flower bud and amongst leaves during the day. The larvae feed for about two weeks but, because of the long egg laying period, larvae may be present in the field for about six weeks in June or July.

The larvae have four instars. When mature, the larvae enter the soil to pupate in earthen cells. The pupal stage lasts from 10 days to two weeks. Adults of the new generation emerge and feed for a short period on the sunflower head or on the uppermost leaves of the plant; they do not mate or lay eggs before re-entering the soil to overwinter.

== Behaviour and ecology ==
=== Predation ===
There are many predators of C. exclamationis in its different life stages. Eggs are predated by the melyrid beetle Collops vittatus, the thirteen spotted ladybird Hippodamia tredecimpunctata, and the convergent ladybird H. convergens. Larvae of the common green lacewing Chrysoperla carnea consume both eggs and larvae. The spined soldier bug Podius maculiventris predates both larvae and adults.

=== Parasites ===
Eggs of C. exclamationis are parasitised by the pteromalid wasp Erixestus winnemana, larvae by the tachinid fly species Myiopharus macellus and M. doryphorae. The rate of parasitisation is high in some fields in Canada and the USA can be as high as 70-100%.

=== As pest of sunflower crops ===
The sunflower beetle is considered to be one of the most damaging defoliators of cultivated sunflowers in North America. Advice published by Kansas State University in 2016 recommends the use of insecticide treatment of sunflower crops if any of the following conditions are met: one adult beetle is present per seedling, larvae reach numbers of 10-15 per plant on upper leaves, or 25 percent defoliation occurs and pupation has not begun. Given the short larval and adult life cycle, delayed planting of sunflower crops is effective in preventing yield reductions caused by sunflower beetle. Recommended insecticides for infested crops include: Beta-cyfluthrin, Carbaryl, Deltamethrin, Esfenvalerate, Gamma-cyhalothrin, Lambda-cyhalothrin, and Zeta-cypermethrin.
