= Michael Elliott (chemist) =

British chemist (1924–2007)

Michael Elliott CBE FRS FRSC
- Born: 30 September 1924
- Died: 17 October 2007 (aged 83)
- Education: University of Southampton

Michael Elliott, CBE, FRS, FRSC (30 September 1924 – 17 October 2007) was a chemist and Lawes Trust Senior Fellow at Rothamsted Experimental Station who invented and commercialised the development of novel insecticides known as pyrethroids.

== Education ==
Elliott was educated at The Skinners' School in Tunbridge Wells and the University of Southampton where he was awarded Bachelor of Science and Doctor of Philosophy degrees.

== Research and career ==
Elliott led the team that invented the major pyrethroid insecticides bioresmethrin, permethrin, cypermethrin and deltamethrin. In 2009 it was estimated that pyrethroid-treated mosquito nets significantly decreased the number of deaths due to malaria.

== Awards and honours ==
Elliott was elected a Fellow of the Royal Society (FRS) in 1979 and appointed Commander of the Order of the British Empire (CBE) in 1982. He was awarded the Wolf Prize in Agriculture in 1989.
