= Fenpropathrin =

Chemical compound

Clinical data
- ATC code: None

Identifiers
- IUPAC name: [Cyano-(3-phenoxyphenyl)methyl] 2,2,3,3-tetramethylcyclopropane-1-carboxylate
- CAS Number: 39515-41-8
- PubChem CID: 47326
- ChemSpider: 45352
- UNII: 87BH96P0MX
- KEGG: C18411
- CompTox Dashboard (EPA): DTXSID0024002
- ECHA InfoCard: 100.049.514

Chemical and physical data
- Formula: C_{22}H_{23}NO_{3}
- Molar mass: 349.430 g·mol^{−1}
- 3D model (JSmol): Interactive image
- SMILES: CC1(C(C1(C)C)C(=O)OC(C#N)C2=CC(=CC=C2)OC3=CC=CC=C3)C
- InChI: InChI=1S/C22H23NO3/c1-21(2)19(22(21,3)4)20(24)26-18(14-23)15-9-8-12-17(13-15)25-16-10-6-5-7-11-16/h5-13,18-19H,1-4H3; Key:XQUXKZZNEFRCAW-UHFFFAOYSA-N

Fenpropathrin, or fenopropathrin, is a widely used pyrethroid insecticide in agriculture and household. Fenpropathrin is an ingestion and contact synthetic pyrethroid. Its mode of action is similar to other natural (pyrethrum) and synthetic pyrethroids where in they interfere with the kinetics of voltage gated sodium channels causing paralysis and death of the pest. Fenpropathrin was the first of the light-stable synthetic pyrethroids to be synthesized in 1971, but it was not commercialized until 1980. Like other pyrethroids with an α-cyano group, fenpropathrin also belongs to the termed type II pyrethroids (e.g. cyfluthrin, cyhalothrin, cypermethrin, deltamethrin and esfenvalerate). Type II pyrethroids are a more potent toxicant than type I in depolarizing insect nerves. Application rates of fenpropathrin in agriculture according to US environmental protection agency (EPA) varies by crop but is not to exceed 0.4 lb ai/acre.

== Toxicity ==
A person developed Parkinson's disease after six months of daily exposure to fenpropathrin, and animal tests subsequently revealed that the compound is a dopaminergic neurotoxin. The patient had a history of eating fenpropathrin-poisoned fish for 6 months. The follow-up Dopaminergic degeneration study was conducted using mice treated with fenpropathrin at 15mg/kg/day for 60 days. It has thus been implicated as an environmental risk factor for Parkinson's disease similar to organochlorines, organophosphates and pyrethroids especially at higher doses. An acute reference dose for chronic dietary exposure for fenpropathrin is set at 0.025/mg/kg/day by US EPA. Fenpropathrin is toxic to bees if they come in contact with them directly similar to other insecticides. Toxicity dissipates with time when deposited on foliage and is <24 hours.

== Environmental Fate ==
Fenpropathrin degrades from soil by two main mechanisms, biodegradation and photochemical degradation of surface deposits. The time of degradation depends on the characteristics of the soils. The half-life of disappearance for fenpropathrin in soils was 11 to 17 days under aerobic conditions and approx >1 yr under anaerobic conditions. The half-life of fenpropathrin on the surface of a sterilized sandy loam was in the range of 3 to 4 days following irradiation with natural sunlight.

== Trade Names ==
Danitol, Meothrin, Tame.

== See also ==
- 6-Hydroxydopamine
- MPTP
- Norsalsolinol
- Rotenone
