= Bioisostere =

Chemical groups which can be substituted to enhance therapeutic activity of drugs

In medicinal chemistry, bioisosteres are chemical substituents or groups with similar physical or chemical properties which produce broadly similar biological properties in the same chemical compound. In drug design, the purpose of exchanging one bioisostere for another is to enhance the desired biological or physical properties of a compound without making significant changes in chemical structure. The main use of this term and its techniques are related to pharmaceutical sciences. Bioisosterism is used to reduce toxicity, change bioavailability, or modify the activity of the lead compound, and may alter the metabolism of the lead.

== Examples ==
=== Classical bioisosteres ===
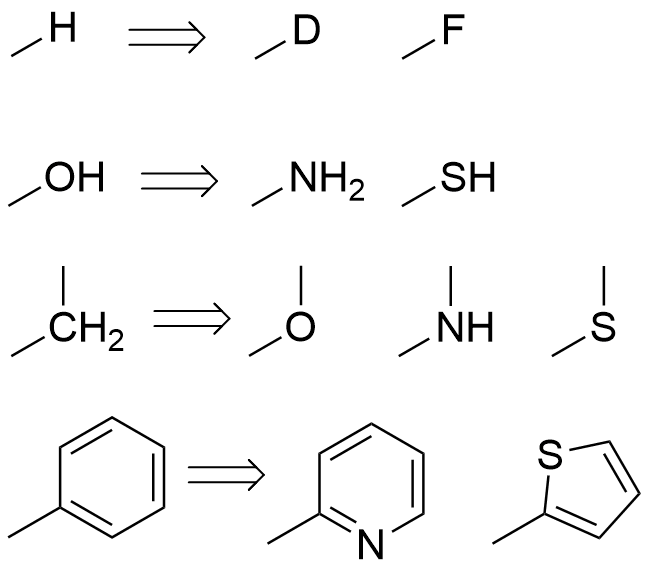
A table of common classical bioisosteres

Classical bioisosterism was originally formulated by James Moir and refined by Irving Langmuir as a response to the observation that different atoms with the same valence electron structure had similar biological properties.

For example, the replacement of a hydrogen atom with a fluorine atom at a site of metabolic oxidation in a drug candidate may prevent such metabolism from taking place. Because the fluorine atom is similar in size to the hydrogen atom the overall topology of the molecule is not significantly affected, leaving the desired biological activity unaffected. However, with a blocked pathway for metabolism, the drug candidate may have a longer half-life.

- Procainamide, an amide, has a longer duration of action than Procaine, an ester, because of the isosteric replacement of the ester oxygen with a nitrogen atom. Procainamide is a classical bioisostere because the valence electron structure of a disubstituted oxygen atom is the same as a trisubstituted nitrogen atom, as Langmuir showed.

Another example is seen in a series of anti-bacterial chalcones. By modifying certain substituents, the pharmacological activity of the chalcone and its toxicity are also modified.

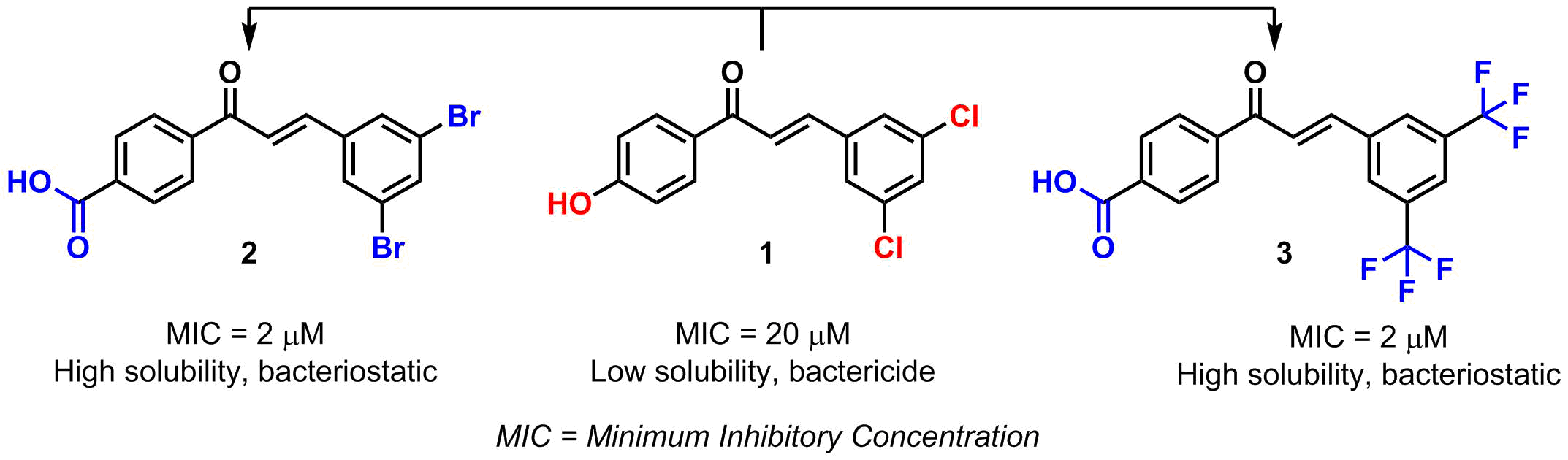
Example of bioisosterism in chalcones

=== Non-classical bioisosteres ===
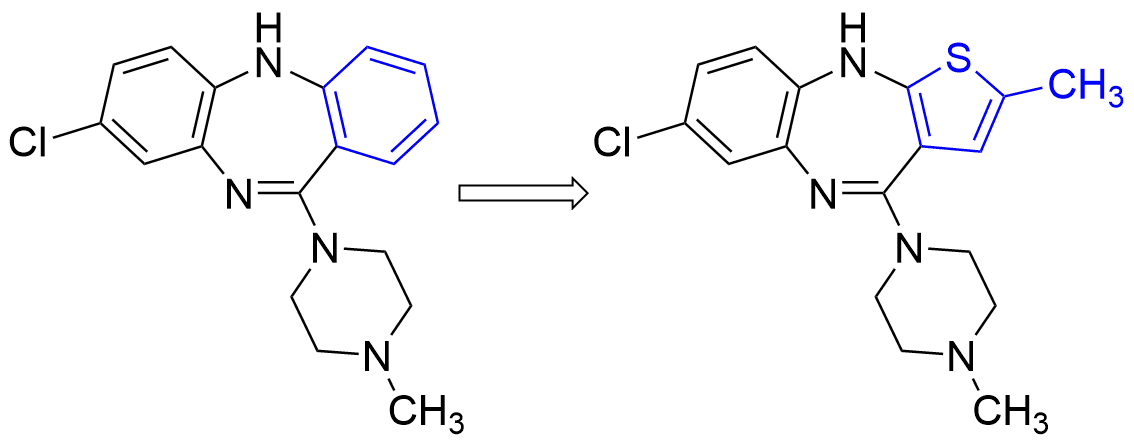
A phenyl for methylthiophene bioisosteric replacement

Non-classical bioisosteres may differ in a multitude of ways from classical bioisosteres, but retain the focus on providing similar sterics and electronic profile to the original functional group. Whereas classical bioisosteres commonly conserve much of the same structural properties, nonclassical bioisosteres are much more dependent on the specific binding needs of the ligand in question and may substitute a linear functional group for a cyclic moiety, an alkyl group for a complex heteroatom moiety, or other changes that go far beyond a simple atom-for-atom switch.

For example, a chloride -Cl group may often be replaced by a trifluoromethyl -CF_{3} group or by a cyano -C≡N group. Depending on the particular molecule used, the substitution may result in little change in activity, or either increased or decreased affinity or efficacy - depending on what factors are important for ligand binding to the target protein. Another example is aromatic rings, where a phenyl -C_{6}H_{5} ring can often be replaced by a different aromatic ring such as thiophene or naphthalene which may improve efficacy, change specificity of binding or reduce metabolically labile sites on the molecule, resulting in better pharmacokinetic properties.

- Alloxanthine is an inhibitor of xanthine oxidase. It is also an isostere of xanthine, the normal substrate for the enzyme. Alloxanthine is considered a non-classical bioisostere because of the scaffold change.

Silafluofen is an isostere of pyrethroid insecticides.

- Silafluofen is an organosilicon analogue of pyrethroid insecticide Etofenprox, wherein a carbon center has been replaced by isosteric silicon, and in addition, one hydrogen atom is replaced by isosteric fluorine atom.

== Other applications ==
Bioisosteres of some patented compounds can be discovered automatically and used to circumvent Markush structure patent claims. It has been proposed that key force field features, that is the pharmacophore, be patented instead.

== See also ==
- Grimm's hydride displacement law, an early hypothesis to describe bioisosterism
