= 3-Phenoxymandelonitrile =

Names
- Preferred IUPAC name (2S)-Hydroxy(3-phenoxyphenyl)acetonitrile

Identifiers
CAS Number	61826-76-4
3D model (JSmol)	Interactive image
ChemSpider	8013157
ECHA InfoCard	100.052.566
EC Number	441-070-6
PubChem CID	9837437
CompTox Dashboard (EPA)	DTXSID00885773
- InChI: InChI=1S/C14H11NO2/c15-10-14(16)11-5-4-8-13(9-11)17-12-6-2-1-3-7-12/h1-9,14,16H/t14-/m1/s1 Key: GXUQMKBQDGPMKZ-CQSZACIVSA-N
- SMILES: C1=CC=C(C=C1)OC2=CC=CC(=C2)[C@@H](C#N)O

Properties
Chemical formula	C_{14}H_{11}NO_{2}
Molar mass	225.247 g·mol^{−1}

Hazards
- GHS labelling
Pictograms	(GHS05: Corrosive) (GHS06: Toxic) (GHS09: Environmental hazard)
Signal word	Warning
Hazard statements	H301, H317, H318, H410
Precautionary statements	P261, P264, P264+P265, P270, P272, P273, P280, P301+P316, P302+P352, P305+P354+P338, P317, P321, P330, P333+P317, P362+P364, P391, P405, P501
- Except where otherwise noted, data are given for materials in their standard state (at 25 °C [77 °F], 100 kPa). Infobox references

3-phenoxymandelonitrile (also 3-phenoxy-α-cyanobenzyl alcohol) is an organic compound belonging to the group of cyanohydrins. It is primarily used in the synthesis of pyrethroids, a class of insecticides.

== Production ==
The synthesis of 3-phenoxymandelonitrile begins with the reaction of 3-phenoxybenzaldehyde with sodium cyanide and acetic anhydride in a water/dichloromethane mixture, using benzyltriethylammonium chloride as a phase transfer catalyst. This reaction initially produces the acetate, which can be hydrolyzed enzymatically with a suitable lipase to yield enantiomerically pure (S)-3-phenoxymandelonitrile through chiral resolution. The desired product can be extracted at this stage. The remaining enantiomeric acetate can undergo racemization via reaction with triethylamine in toluene or diisopropyl ether to improve yield. An alternative synthesis involves transferring a cyano group from acetone cyanohydrin to 3-phenoxybenzaldehyde. Again, enzymatic reactions through an ester can be used to produce the enantiomerically pure compound.

== Use ==
(S)-3-Phenoxymandelonitrile serves as an important intermediate in the production of various pyrethroids, which are carboxylic acid esters incorporating the compound as an alcohol component, and are employed as insecticides. Notable examples within this group include deltamethrin and esfenvalerate. The presence of the 3-phenoxy group and nitriles enhances the efficacy of these compounds compared to other pyrethroids.

Deltamethrin, an ester of 3-phenoxymandelonitrile used as an insecticide
