= C25H22ClNO3 =

The molecular formula C_{25}H_{22}ClNO_{3} (molar mass: 419.90 g/mol, exact mass: 419.1288 u) may refer to:

- Esfenvalerate
- Fenvalerate
