= C17H22N2O4 =

The molecular formula C_{17}H_{22}N_{2}O_{4} (molar mass: 318.368 g/mol) may refer to:

- Imiprothrin
- N-Phenylacetyl-L-prolylglycine ethyl ester
- RE-109
