= C25H28O3 =

The molecular formula C_{25}H_{28}O_{3} (molar mass: 376.49 g/mol) may refer to:

- Estradiol benzoate (EB)
- Estradiol 17β-benzoate
- Etofenprox
