= Insect Shield =

Brand of insect repellent

Insect Shield is a brand of insect repellent used on clothes. It contains permethrin, which is similar to bug-repellent, and registered by the U.S. Environmental Protection Agency (EPA).

The product has been used to protect against ticks carrying Lyme Disease. The manufacturers also suggest it can protect against mosquitoes, ticks, ants, flies, chiggers, and midges, and that the repellent is effective on clothes for up to 70 washes.
