= Pyrethroid hydrolase =

Class of enzymes

Identifiers
- EC no.: 3.1.1.88

Databases
- IntEnz: IntEnz view
- BRENDA: BRENDA entry
- ExPASy: NiceZyme view
- KEGG: KEGG entry
- MetaCyc: metabolic pathway
- PRIAM: profile
- PDB structures: RCSB PDB PDBe PDBsum
Search
- PMC: articles
- PubMed: articles
- NCBI: proteins

The enzyme pyrethroid hydrolase (EC 3.1.1.88, pyrethroid-hydrolyzing carboxylesterase, pyrethroid-hydrolysing esterase, pyrethroid-hydrolyzing esterase, pyrethroid-selective esterase, pyrethroid-cleaving enzyme, permethrinase, PytH, EstP; systematic name pyrethroid-ester hydrolase) catalyses the reaction

trans-permethrin + H_{2}O $\rightleftharpoons$ (3-phenoxyphenyl)methanol + (1S,3R)-3-(2,2-dichloroethenyl)-2,2-dimethylcyclopropanecarboxylate

The enzyme is involved in degradation of pyrethroid pesticides.
