= Anvil (insecticide) =

Brand of insecticide

Anvil is an insecticide widely employed to combat West Nile fever, a mosquito-borne disease identified in approximately 10,000 residents of the United States from 1999-2006. It is sprayed in Chicago and many other cities. Sumithrin, a synthetic pyrethroid, is the main active ingredient.

Anvil is applied aerially via fixed-wing and rotary aircraft or via ground applications (truck/ATV/backpack) using ultra-low volume (ULV) sprayers. According to the Anvil Technical Bulletin published in January 2006, these sprayers create a fine mist of drops that average 17 micrometres in size. A very small amount of active ingredient is used; about 0.6 ounces (17 g) of active ingredient is used to treat 1 acre (0.40 ha) (4.2 kg/km²).

The active ingredients in Anvil break down quickly in sunlight and do not bioaccumulate. There are no reentry precautions for Anvil.

Anvil has been tested in 43 field trials in the United States against 30 mosquito species.

== History ==
Sumithrin was registered for use by the U.S. Environmental Protection Agency in 1975 and Anvil is registered for ground and aerial application in outdoor residential and recreational areas. Anvil is manufactured and distributed by Clarke Mosquito Control.

In 2003, Anvil was used to treat more than one million acres (4,000 km²) in Larimer County, Colorado during a West Nile virus outbreak. According to the Anvil Technical Bulletin, this application reduced mosquito populations by approximately 80 percent.

In 2006, Anvil was used in Massachusetts after Governor Mitt Romney declared a state of emergency after the virus that causes Eastern equine encephalitis (EEE) was identified in large quantities in mosquito populations and again in 2019 via aerial spraying after multiple people tested positive for EEE.

== Controversy ==
No-spray protests have called for more organic methods of preventing West Nile fever due to concerns about the potential health and environmental effects of the spray as well as recent studies showing the ineffectiveness of the spray. The active compound is an endocrine disruptor and toxic to bees and fish.
