= Phenothrin =

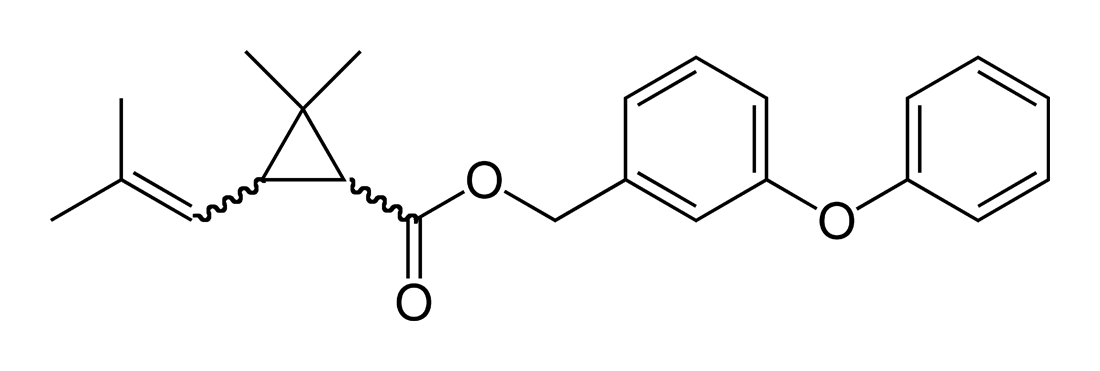

Names
- IUPAC name (3-Phenoxyphenyl)methyl 2,2-dimethyl-3-(2-methylprop-1-enyl)cyclopropane-1-carboxylate
- Other names Sumithrin; Phenothrine; Phenoxythrin; Sumitrin; Wellcide; Pibutin; Anvil; Duet; Anchimanaito 20S

Identifiers
CAS Number	26002-80-2
3D model (JSmol)	Interactive image
Beilstein Reference	2160930
ChEBI	CHEBI:34916
ChEMBL	ChEMBL1322884
ChemSpider	4603
DrugBank	DB13717
ECHA InfoCard	100.043.079
EC Number	247-404-5
KEGG	D08357
MeSH	Phenothrin
PubChem CID	4767
UNII	707484X33X
UN number	3082 2902
CompTox Dashboard (EPA)	DTXSID7032688
- InChI: InChI=1S/C23H26O3/c1-16(2)13-20-21(23(20,3)4)22(24)25-15-17-9-8-12-19(14-17)26-18-10-6-5-7-11-18/h5-14,20-21H,15H2,1-4H3 Key: SBNFWQZLDJGRLK-UHFFFAOYSA-N; InChI=1/C23H26O3/c1-16(2)13-20-21(23(20,3)4)22(24)25-15-17-9-8-12-19(14-17)26-18-10-6-5-7-11-18/h5-14,20-21H,15H2,1-4H3 Key: SBNFWQZLDJGRLK-UHFFFAOYAY
- SMILES: O=C(OCc2cccc(Oc1ccccc1)c2)C3C(/C=C(/C)C)C3(C)C

Properties
Chemical formula	C_{23}H_{26}O_{3}
Molar mass	350.451 g/mol
Melting point	<25 °C
Boiling point	>290 °C

Pharmacology
ATC code	P03AC03 (WHO) QP53AC03 (WHO)

Hazards
- GHS labelling
Pictograms	(GHS07: Exclamation mark) (GHS09: Environmental hazard)
Signal word	Warning
Hazard statements	H302, H312, H332, H410
Precautionary statements	P261, P264, P270, P271, P273, P280, P301+P312, P302+P352, P304+P312, P304+P340, P312, P322, P330, P363, P391, P501
- Except where otherwise noted, data are given for materials in their standard state (at 25 °C [77 °F], 100 kPa). verify (what is ?) Infobox references

Phenothrin, also called sumithrin and d-phenothrin, is a synthetic pyrethroid that kills adult fleas and ticks. It has also been used to kill head lice in humans. d-Phenothrin is used as a component of aerosol insecticides for domestic use. It is often used with methoprene, an insect growth regulator that interrupts the insect's biological lifecycle by killing the eggs.

== Effects ==
Phenothrin is primarily used to kill fleas and ticks. It is also used to kill head lice in humans, but studies conducted in Paris and the United Kingdom have shown widespread resistance to phenothrin.

It is extremely toxic to bees. A U.S. Environmental Protection Agency (EPA) study found that 0.07 micrograms were enough to kill honey bees. It is also extremely toxic to aquatic life with a study showing concentrations of 0.03 ppb killing mysid shrimp. It has increased risk of liver cancer in rats and mice in long-term exposure, with doses in the range of 100 milligrams per kilogram of body weight per day, or above. It is capable of killing mosquitoes, although remains poisonous to cats and dogs, with seizures and deaths being reported due to poisoning. Specific data on concentrations or exposure are lacking.

Phenothrin has been found to possess antiandrogen properties, and was responsible for a small epidemic of gynecomastia via isolated environmental exposure.

The EPA has not assessed its effect on cancer in humans. However, one study performed by the Mount Sinai School of Medicine linked sumithrin with breast cancer; the link made by its effect on increasing the expression of a gene responsible for mammary tissue proliferation.

== EPA action ==
In 2005, the U.S. EPA cancelled permission to use phenothrin in several flea and tick products, at the request of the manufacturer, Hartz Mountain Industries. The products were linked to a range of adverse reactions, including hair loss, salivation, tremors, and numerous deaths in cats and kittens. In the short term, the agreement called for new warning labels on the products.

As of March 31, 2006, the sale and distribution of Hartz's phenothrin-containing flea and tick products for cats has been terminated. However, EPA's product cancellation order did not apply to Hartz flea and tick products for dogs, and Hartz continues to produce many of its flea and tick products for dogs.

== See also ==
- Permethrin
- Resmethrin
- Deltamethrin
