= Periodic systems of small molecules =

Charts of molecules

Periodic systems of molecules are charts of molecules similar to the periodic table of the elements. Construction of such charts was initiated in the early 20th century and is still ongoing.

It is commonly believed that the periodic law, represented by the periodic chart, is echoed in the behavior of molecules, at least small molecules. For instance, if one replaces any one of the atoms in a triatomic molecule with a rare gas atom, there will be a drastic change in the molecule’s properties. Several goals could be accomplished by constructing an explicit representation of this periodic law as manifested in molecules: (1) a classification scheme for the vast number of molecules that exist, starting with small ones having just a few atoms, for use as a teaching aid and tool for archiving data, (2) forecasting data for molecular properties based on the classification scheme, and (3) a sort of unity with the periodic chart and the periodic system of fundamental particles.

== Physical periodic systems of molecules ==
Periodic systems (or charts or tables) of molecules are the subjects of two reviews. The systems of diatomic molecules include those of (1) H. D. W. Clark, and (2) F.-A. Kong, which somewhat resemble the atomic chart. The system of R. Hefferlin et al. was developed from (3) a three-dimensional to (4) a four-dimensional system Kronecker product of the element chart with itself.

$$\begin{pmatrix}\rm Li &\rm Be \\\rm Na &\rm Mg \end{pmatrix}
\otimes
\begin{pmatrix}\rm Li &\rm Be \\\rm Na &\rm Mg \end{pmatrix}
=
\begin{pmatrix}
\rm Li_2 &\rm LiBe &\rm BeLi &\rm Be_2 \\
\rm LiNa &\rm LiMg &\rm BeNa &\rm BeMg \\
\rm NaLi &\rm NaBe &\rm MgLi &\rm MgBe \\
\rm Na_2 &\rm NaMg &\rm MgNa &\rm Mg_2 \\
\end{pmatrix}$$
The Kronecker product of a hypothetical four-element periodic chart. The sixteen molecules, some of which are redundant, suggest a hypercube, which in turn suggests that the molecules exist in a four-dimensional space; the coordinates are the period numbers and group numbers of the two constituent atoms.

A totally different kind of periodic system is (5) that of G. V. Zhuvikin, which is based on group dynamics. In all but the first of these cases, other researchers provided invaluable contributions and some of them are co-authors. The architectures of these systems have been adjusted by Kong and Hefferlin to include ionized species, and expanded by Kong, Hefferlin, and Zhuvikin and Hefferlin to the space of triatomic molecules. These architectures are mathematically related to the chart of the elements. They were first called “physical” periodic systems.

== Chemical periodic systems of molecules ==
Other investigators have focused on building structures that address specific kinds of molecules such as alkanes (Morozov); benzenoids (Dias); functional groups containing fluorine, oxygen, nitrogen and sulfur (Haas); or a combination of core charge, number of shells, redox potentials, and acid-base tendencies (Gorski). These structures are not restricted to molecules with a given number of atoms and they bear little resemblance to the element chart; they are called “chemical” systems. Chemical systems do not start with the element chart, but instead start with, for example, formula enumerations (Dias), Grimm's hydride displacement law (Haas), reduced potential curves (Jenz), a set of molecular descriptors (Gorski), and similar strategies.

== Hyperperiodicity ==
E. V. Babaev has erected a hyperperiodic system which in principle includes all of the systems described above except those of Dias, Gorski, and Jenz.

== Bases of the element chart and periodic systems of molecules ==
The periodic chart of the elements, like a small stool, is supported by three legs: (a) the Bohr–Sommerfeld “solar system” atomic model (with electron spin and the Madelung principle), which provides the magic-number elements that end each row of the table and gives the number of elements in each row, (b) solutions to the Schrödinger equation, which provide the same information, and (c) data provided by experiment, by the solar system model, and by solutions to the Schroedinger equation. The Bohr–Sommerfeld model should not be ignored: it gave explanations for the wealth of spectroscopic data that were already in existence before the advent of wave mechanics.

Each of the molecular systems listed above, and those not cited, is also supported by three legs: (a) physical and chemical data arranged in graphical or tabular patterns (which, for physical periodic systems at least, echo the appearance of the element chart), (b) group dynamic, valence-bond, molecular-orbital, and other fundamental theories, and (c) summing of atomic period and group numbers (Kong), the Kronecker product and exploitation of higher dimensions (Hefferlin), formula enumerations (Dias), the hydrogen-displacement principle (Haas), reduced potential curves (Jenz), and similar strategies.

A chronological list of the contributions to this field contains almost thirty entries dated 1862, 1907, 1929, 1935, and 1936; then, after a pause, a higher level of activity beginning with the 100th anniversary of Mendeleev’s publication of his element chart, 1969. Many publications on periodic systems of molecules include some predictions of molecular properties, but starting at the turn of the Century there have been serious attempts to use periodic systems for the prediction of progressively more precise data for various numbers of molecules. Among these attempts are those of Kong, and Hefferlin.

== A collapsed-coordinate system for triatomic molecules ==
The collapsed-coordinate system has three independent variables instead of the six demanded by the Kronecker-product system. The reduction of independent variables makes use of three properties of gas-phase, ground-state, triatomic molecules. (1) In general, whatever the total number of constituent atomic valence electrons, data for isoelectronic molecules tend to be more similar than for adjacent molecules that have more or fewer valence electrons; for triatomic molecules, the electron count is the sum of the atomic group numbers (the sum of the column numbers 1 to 8 in the p-block of the periodic chart of the elements, C1+C2+C3). (2) Linear/bent triatomic molecules appear to be slightly more stable, other parameters being equal, if carbon is the central atom. (3) Most physical properties of diatomic molecules (especially spectroscopic constants) are closely monotonic with respect to the product of the two atomic period (or row) numbers, R1 and R2; for triatomic molecules, the monotonicity is close with respect to R1R2+R2R3 (which reduces to R1R2 for diatomic molecules). Therefore, the coordinates x, y, and z of the collapsed-coordinate system are C1+C2+C3, C2, and R1R2+R2R3. Multiple-regression predictions of four property values for molecules with tabulated data agree very well with the tabulated data (the error measures of the predictions include the tabulated data in all but a few cases).

== See also ==
- History of the periodic table
- Periodic table
