= ATC code P03 =

ATC code P03 Ectoparasiticides, including scabicides, insecticides and repellents is a therapeutic subgroup of the Anatomical Therapeutic Chemical Classification System, a system of alphanumeric codes developed by the World Health Organization (WHO) for the classification of drugs and other medical products. Subgroup P03 is part of the anatomical group P Antiparasitic products, insecticides and repellents.

National versions of the ATC classification may include additional codes not present in this list, which follows the WHO version.

== P03A Ectoparasiticides, including scabicides ==
=== P03AA Sulfur containing products ===
P03AA01 Dixanthogen
P03AA02 Potassium polysulfide
P03AA03 Mesulfen
P03AA04 Disulfiram
P03AA05 Thiram
P03AA54 Disulfiram, combinations

=== P03AB Chlorine containing products ===
P03AB01 Clofenotane
P03AB02 Lindane
P03AB51 Clofenotane, combinations

=== P03AC Pyrethrines, including synthetic compounds ===
P03AC01 Pyrethrum
P03AC02 Bioallethrin
P03AC03 Phenothrin
P03AC04 Permethrin
P03AC51 Pyrethrum, combinations
P03AC52 Bioallethrin, combinations
P03AC53 Phenothrin, combinations
P03AC54 Permethrin, combinations

=== P03AX Other ectoparasiticides, including scabicides ===
P03AX01 Benzyl benzoate
P03AX02 Copper oleinate
P03AX03 Malathion
P03AX04 Quassia
P03AX05 Dimeticone
P03AX06 Benzyl alcohol
P03AX07 Abametapir

== P03B Insecticides and repellents ==
=== P03BA Pyrethrines ===
P03BA01 Cyfluthrin
P03BA02 Cypermethrin
P03BA03 Decamethrin
P03BA04 Tetramethrin

=== P03BX Other insecticides and repellents ===
P03BX01 Diethyltoluamide
P03BX02 Dimethylphthalate
P03BX03 Dibutylphthalate
P03BX04 Dibutylsuccinate
P03BX05 Dimethylcarbate
P03BX06 Etohexadiol
