= Tetramethrin =

Potent insecticide

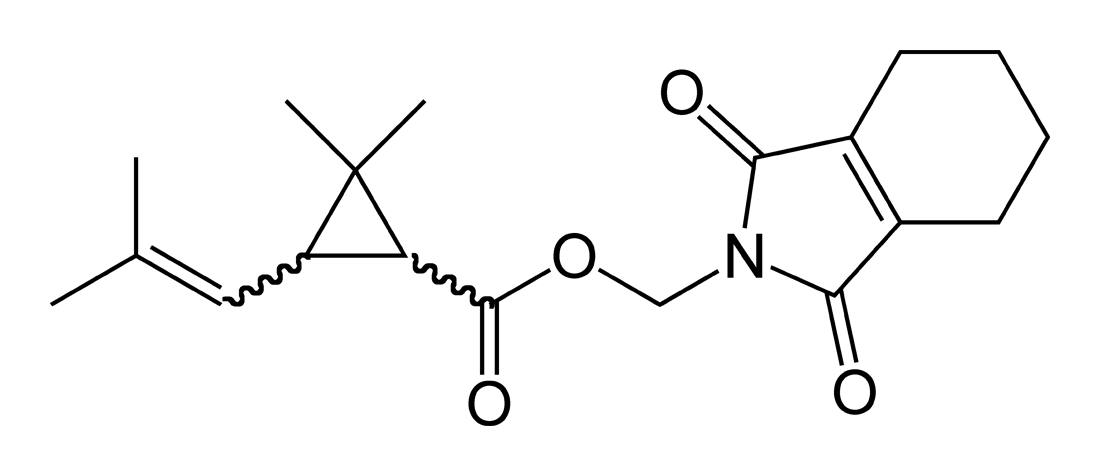
- Tetramethrin

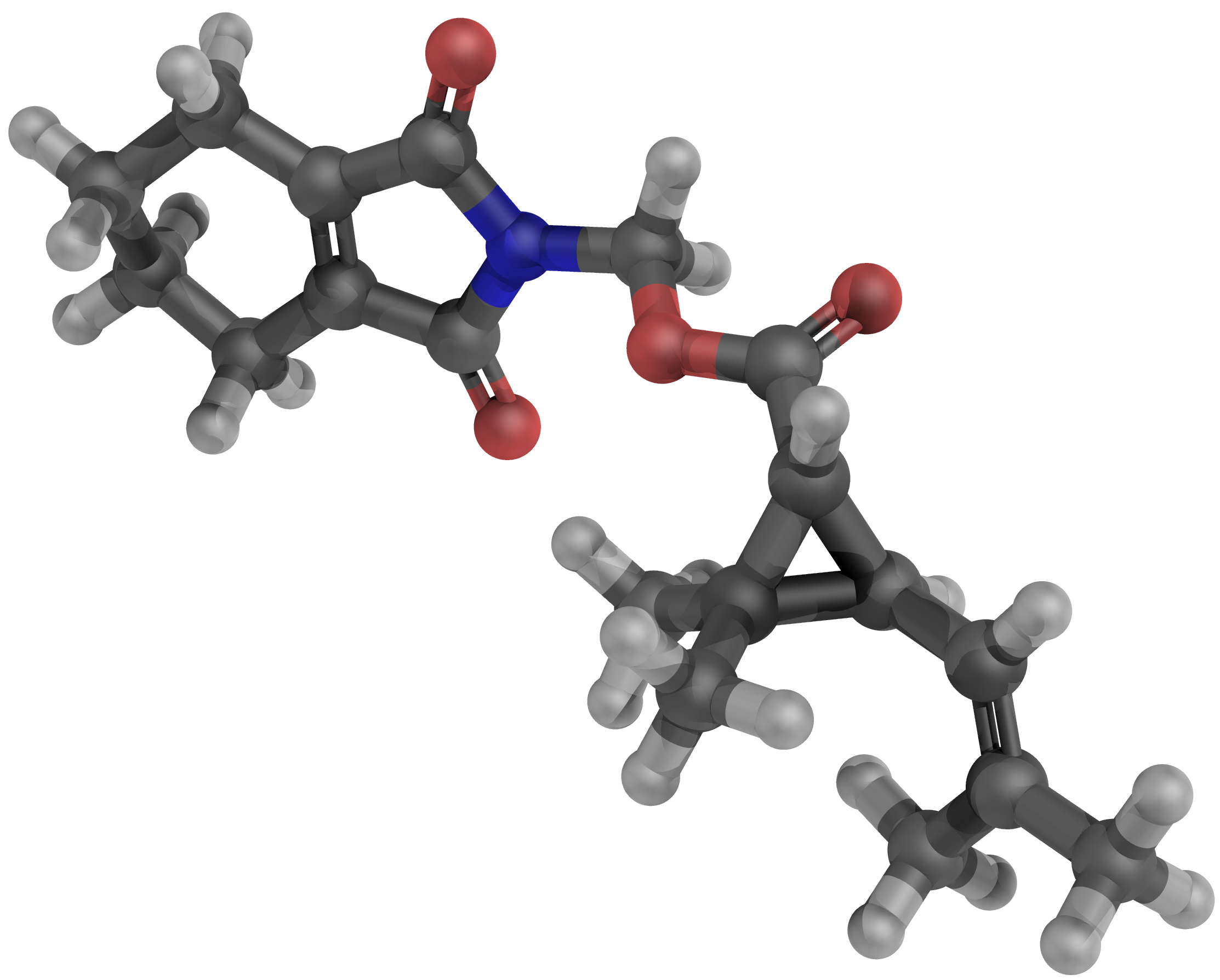
- 3D model

Names
- IUPAC name (1,3-Dioxo-4,5,6,7-tetrahydroisoindol-2-yl)methyl 2,2-dimethyl-3-(2-methylprop-1-enyl)cyclopropane-1-carboxylate
- Preferred IUPAC name (1,3-Dioxo-1,3,4,5,6,7-hexahydro-2H-isoindol-2-yl)methyl 2,2-dimethyl-3-(2-methylprop-1-en-1-yl)cyclopropane-1-carboxylate

Identifiers
CAS Number	7696-12-0
3D model (JSmol)	Interactive image
ChEBI	CHEBI:39397
ChemSpider	75773
ECHA InfoCard	100.028.829
EC Number	214-619-0
KEGG	D07368
PubChem CID	83975
RTECS number	GZ1730000
UNII	Z72930Q46K
CompTox Dashboard (EPA)	DTXSID6032649
- InChI: InChI=1S/C19H25NO4/c1-11(2)9-14-15(19(14,3)4)18(23)24-10-20-16(21)12-7-5-6-8-13(12)17(20)22/h9,14-15H,5-8,10H2,1-4H3 Key: CXBMCYHAMVGWJQ-UHFFFAOYSA-N; InChI=1/C19H25NO4/c1-11(2)9-14-15(19(14,3)4)18(23)24-10-20-16(21)12-7-5-6-8-13(12)17(20)22/h9,14-15H,5-8,10H2,1-4H3 Key: CXBMCYHAMVGWJQ-UHFFFAOYAA
- SMILES: O=C1\C3=C(/C(=O)N1COC(=O)C2C(\C=C(/C)C)C2(C)C)CCCC3

Properties
Chemical formula	C_{19}H_{25}NO_{4}
Molar mass	331.406 g/mol
Appearance	white crystalline solid
Odor	strong, pyrethrum-like
Density	1.108 g/cm^{3}
Melting point	65 to 80 °C (149 to 176 °F; 338 to 353 K)
Solubility in water	0.00183 g/100 mL
Solubility	soluble in methane, hexane slightly soluble in acetone, n-octanol, ethanol very slightly soluble in xylene
log P	4.73
Vapor pressure	10 Pa
Refractive index (n_{D})	1.5175

Pharmacology
ATC code	P03BA04 (WHO) QP53AC13 (WHO)

Hazards
- Lethal dose or concentration (LD, LC)
LD_{50} (median dose)	20,000 mg/kg (rat, oral)
- Except where otherwise noted, data are given for materials in their standard state (at 25 °C [77 °F], 100 kPa). verify (what is ?) Infobox references

Tetramethrin is a potent synthetic insecticide belonging to the pyrethroid family that rapidly paralyzes flying and crawling insects immediately upon contact. It is inspired by the insecticidal properties of natural chrysanthemum flowers. While it has a relatively low toxicity for humans and mammals, it is heavily restricted in many regions due to being highly toxic to aquatic life and bees, as well as being classified as a suspected carcinogen.

== History ==
Tetramethrin was the second pyrethroid to become commercially available. It was introduced by Sumitomo Chemical in 1965 as a non-systemic contact insecticide.

Tetramethrin was approved for use as an insecticide in Germany from 1977 to 1981.

== Synthesis and preparation ==
Tetramethrin can be synthesized by reacting 1-cyclohexene-1,2-dicarboximide with formaldehyde to form a hemiaminal, followed by esterification with chrysanthemic acid.

A mixture enriched in the (1R)-cis and (1R)-trans isomers is marketed under the name d-tetramethrin.

== Properties ==
It is a white crystalline solid with a melting point of 65–80 °C. The commercial product is a mixture of stereoisomers.

== Uses ==
Tetramethrin is primarily used to control indoor pests such as flies, mosquitoes, and cockroaches. It is commonly used as an insecticide, and affects the insect's nervous system. It is found in many household insecticide products.

== Approval ==
The use of tetramethrin as an active ingredient in plant protection products is not permitted in the European Union. No plant protection products containing this active ingredient are currently approved in Germany, Austria, or Switzerland. Until November 2005, tetramethrin was listed in Annex 1 (Active ingredients approved for use in plant protection products) of the Swiss Plant Protection Products Ordinance. A decision on its notification as a biocide in product type 18 (insecticides, acaricides, and products against other arthropods) is still pending.

Tetramethrin was classified as a Category 2 carcinogen in 2018 by Directorate-General for the Environment of the European Commission.

== Degradation ==
Tetramethrin degrades rapidly in the environment. Its photolysis half-life in air, resulting from a reaction with ozone, is approximately 30 minutes. Its hydrolysis half-life depends on the pH and ranges from a few minutes to three weeks.

Tetramethrin has an expected half-life of 12.5–14 days in soil and 13–25 days in water.
