= Cyphenothrin =

Names
- IUPAC name Cyano(3-phenoxyphenyl)methyl 2,2-dimethyl-3-(2-methylprop-1-en-1-yl)cyclopropanecarboxylate
- Other names (±)-α-Cyano-3-phenoxybenzyl (±)-cis/trans-chrysanthemate

Identifiers
CAS Number	39515-40-7
3D model (JSmol)	Interactive image
ChemSpider	35087
ECHA InfoCard	100.049.513
PubChem CID	38283
UNII	S0IU5Y1R32
CompTox Dashboard (EPA)	DTXSID4032536
- InChI: InChI=1S/C24H25NO3/c1-16(2)13-20-22(24(20,3)4)23(26)28-21(15-25)17-9-8-12-19(14-17)27-18-10-6-5-7-11-18/h5-14,20-22H,1-4H3 Key: FJDPATXIBIBRIM-UHFFFAOYSA-N; InChI=1/C24H25NO3/c1-16(2)13-20-22(24(20,3)4)23(26)28-21(15-25)17-9-8-12-19(14-17)27-18-10-6-5-7-11-18/h5-14,20-22H,1-4H3 Key: FJDPATXIBIBRIM-UHFFFAOYAC
- SMILES: N#CC(OC(=O)C1C(/C=C(/C)C)C1(C)C)c3cccc(Oc2ccccc2)c3

Properties
Chemical formula	C_{24}H_{25}NO_{3}
Molar mass	375.468 g·mol^{−1}
- Except where otherwise noted, data are given for materials in their standard state (at 25 °C [77 °F], 100 kPa). Infobox references

Cyphenothrin is a synthetic pyrethroid insecticide. It is effective against cockroaches that have developed resistance to organophosphorous and carbamate insecticides.
