= Tralomethrin =

Names
- IUPAC name (1R,3S)-2,2-Dimethyl-3-(1,2,2,2-tetrabromoethyl)-1-cyclopropanecarboxylic acid [(S)-cyano-[3-(phenoxy)phenyl]methyl] ester

Identifiers
CAS Number	66841-25-6
3D model (JSmol)	Interactive image
ChemSpider	43788
ECHA InfoCard	100.060.429
KEGG	C18413
PubChem CID	48132
UNII	W2Z59VSQ0O
CompTox Dashboard (EPA)	DTXSID0024343
- InChI: InChI=1S/C22H19Br4NO3/c1-21(2)17(19(23)22(24,25)26)18(21)20(28)30-16(12-27)13-7-6-10-15(11-13)29-14-8-4-3-5-9-14/h3-11,16-19H,1-2H3/t16-,17-,18+,19?/m1/s1 Key: YWSCPYYRJXKUDB-KAKFPZCNSA-N; InChI=1/C22H19Br4NO3/c1-21(2)17(19(23)22(24,25)26)18(21)20(28)30-16(12-27)13-7-6-10-15(11-13)29-14-8-4-3-5-9-14/h3-11,16-19H,1-2H3/t16-,17-,18+,19?/m1/s1 Key: YWSCPYYRJXKUDB-KAKFPZCNBC
- SMILES: CC1(C)[C@@H](C(Br)C(Br)(Br)Br)[C@H]1C(=O)O[C@H](C#N)c1cccc(Oc2ccccc2)c1

Properties
Chemical formula	C_{22}H_{19}Br_{4}NO_{3}
Molar mass	665.014 g·mol^{−1}
Appearance	Colorless liquid
Density	1.70 g/cm^{3} at 20 °C
Melting point	138 to 148 °C (280 to 298 °F; 411 to 421 K)
Boiling point	594 °C (1,101 °F; 867 K)
- Except where otherwise noted, data are given for materials in their standard state (at 25 °C [77 °F], 100 kPa). verify (what is ?) Infobox references

Tralomethrin is a pyrethroid insecticide.

Tralomethrin has potent insecticidal properties; it kills by modifying the gating kinetics of the sodium channels in neurons, increasing the length of time the channel remains open after a stimulus, thereby depolarizing the neuron for a longer period of time. This leads to uncontrolled spasming, paralysis, and eventual death. Insects with certain mutations in their sodium channel gene may be resistant to tralomethrin and other similar insecticides.

== Effectiveness ==
Tralomethrin is also effective against most members of class Arachnida as well as insects, in addition studies by the EPA on the ecotoxicity of tralomethrin shows results as follows:

Tralomethrin Ecotoxicity
Organism Group	Effects Noted
Aquatic plants	Accumulation
Crustaceans	Intoxication, Population
Fish	Accumulation, Mortality, Population
Insects	Mortality, Population
Molluscs	Intoxication
Zooplankton	Intoxication, Mortality, Population

== Impact on human health ==
Tralomethrin is a pyrethroid insecticide. The symptoms of poisoning with pyrethroid compounds are all alike:

- Irritation of skin and eyes.
- Irritability to sound or touch, abnormal facial sensation, sensation of prickling, tingling or creeping on skin, numbness.
- Headache, dizziness, nausea, vomiting, diarrhea, excessive salivation, fatigue.
- In severe cases: fluid in the lungs and muscle twitching may develop. Seizures may occur and are more common with more toxic cyano-pyrethroids.
