= List of fellows of the Royal Society elected in 1979 =

Fellows of the Royal Society elected in 1979.

== Fellows ==
1. Jerzy Neyman (1894–1981)
2. Janet Vida Watson (1923–1985)
3. Evelyn Martin Lansdowne Beale (1928–1985)
4. Yakov Borisovich Zel'dovich (1914–1987)
5. William Charles Evans (1911–1988)
6. Dame Janet Maria Vaughan (1899–1993)
7. Alastair Graham (1906–2000)
8. Patrick Anthony Merton (1920–2000)
9. Julius Axelrod (1912–2004)
10. Digby Johns McLaren (1919–2004)
11. John Maxwell Cowley (1923–2004)
12. Winifred Anne Tutin (1915–2007)
13. Durward William John Cruickshank (1927–2007)
14. John Hilton Edwards (d. 2007)
15. Michael Elliott (d. 2007)
16. Joshua Lederberg (d. 2008)
17. Milton Robert James Salton (d. 2008)
18. Olgierd Cecil Zienkiewicz (d. 2009)
19. Harry Smith (1921–2011)
20. Sir Bernard Crossland (d. 2011)
21. David Alan Walker (1928–2012)
22. Godfrey Harry Stafford (1920–2013)
23. Sir Kenneth Murray (1930–2013)
24. John Robert Laurence Allen
25. Michael Farries Ashby
26. Michael Joseph Crumpton
27. Sir Michael Anthony Epstein (1921–2024)
28. Raymond Freeman
29. Sir Richard Lavenham Gardner
30. Cyril Hilsum (1925–2026)
31. Sir David Alan Hopwood
32. Keith Usherwood Ingold
33. Edward Irving
34. Geoffrey Melvill Jones
35. Devendra Lal
36. Michael Franz Lappert
37. Ian Grant Macdonald
38. Robert McCredie May Baron May of Oxford
39. Brenda Atkinson Milner
40. Denis Noble
41. Martin John Rees Baron Rees of Ludlow
42. Paul Harry Roberts
43. John Griggs Thompson
44. David James Thouless (1934–2019)
