= Silafluofen =

Names
- Preferred IUPAC name (4-Ethoxyphenyl)[3-(4-fluoro-3-phenoxyphenyl)propyl]di(methyl)silane
- Other names Eflusilanat; Silonen

Identifiers
| CAS Number | 105024-66-6 |
| 3D model (JSmol) | Interactive image |
| ChEBI | CHEBI:39393 |
| ChEMBL | ChEMBL493481 |
| ChemSpider | 83448 |
| ECHA InfoCard | 100.100.662 |
| PubChem CID | 92430 |
| UNII | F4SX221ILG |
| CompTox Dashboard (EPA) | DTXSID4057924 |
- InChI: InChI=1S/C25H29FO2Si/c1-4-27-21-13-15-23(16-14-21)29(2,3)18-8-9-20-12-17-24(26)25(19-20)28-22-10-6-5-7-11-22/h5-7,10-17,19H,4,8-9,18H2,1-3H3 Key: HPYNBECUCCGGPA-UHFFFAOYSA-N; InChI=1/C25H29FO2Si/c1-4-27-21-13-15-23(16-14-21)29(2,3)18-8-9-20-12-17-24(26)25(19-20)28-22-10-6-5-7-11-22/h5-7,10-17,19H,4,8-9,18H2,1-3H3 Key: HPYNBECUCCGGPA-UHFFFAOYAS
- SMILES: Fc2ccc(cc2Oc1ccccc1)CCC[Si](c3ccc(OCC)cc3)(C)C

Properties
| Chemical formula | C_{25}H_{29}FO_{2}Si |
| Molar mass | 408.588 g·mol^{−1} |
- Except where otherwise noted, data are given for materials in their standard state (at 25 °C [77 °F], 100 kPa). verify (what is ?) Infobox references

Silafluofen is a fluorinated organosilicon pyrethroid insecticide.

Silafluofen is used agriculturally against soil-borne insects such as termites, and as a wood preservative. It is registered in Asia (India, Japan, Taiwan, Vietnam) since at least 1995 for crops such as drupes, tea and rice, but has not been notified or authorised in the European Union for example.
