= Grimm's hydride displacement law =

Grimm's Hydride Displacement Law is an early hypothesis, formulated in 1925, to describe bioisosterism, the ability of certain chemical groups to function as or mimic other chemical groups.

“Atoms anywhere up to four places in the periodic system before an inert gas change their properties by uniting with one to four hydrogen atoms, in such a manner that the resulting combinations behave like pseudoatoms, which are similar to elements in the groups one to four places respectively, to their right.”

According to Grimm, each vertical column (of Table below) would represent a group of isosteres.

Table 1: Grimm's Hydride Displacement Law
C	N	O	F	Ne	Na
	CH	NH	OH	FH	-
		CH_{2}	NH_{2}	OH_{2}	FH_{2}^{+}
			CH_{3}	NH_{3}	OH_{3}^{+}
				CH_{4}	NH_{4}^{+}
