= Fenvalerate =

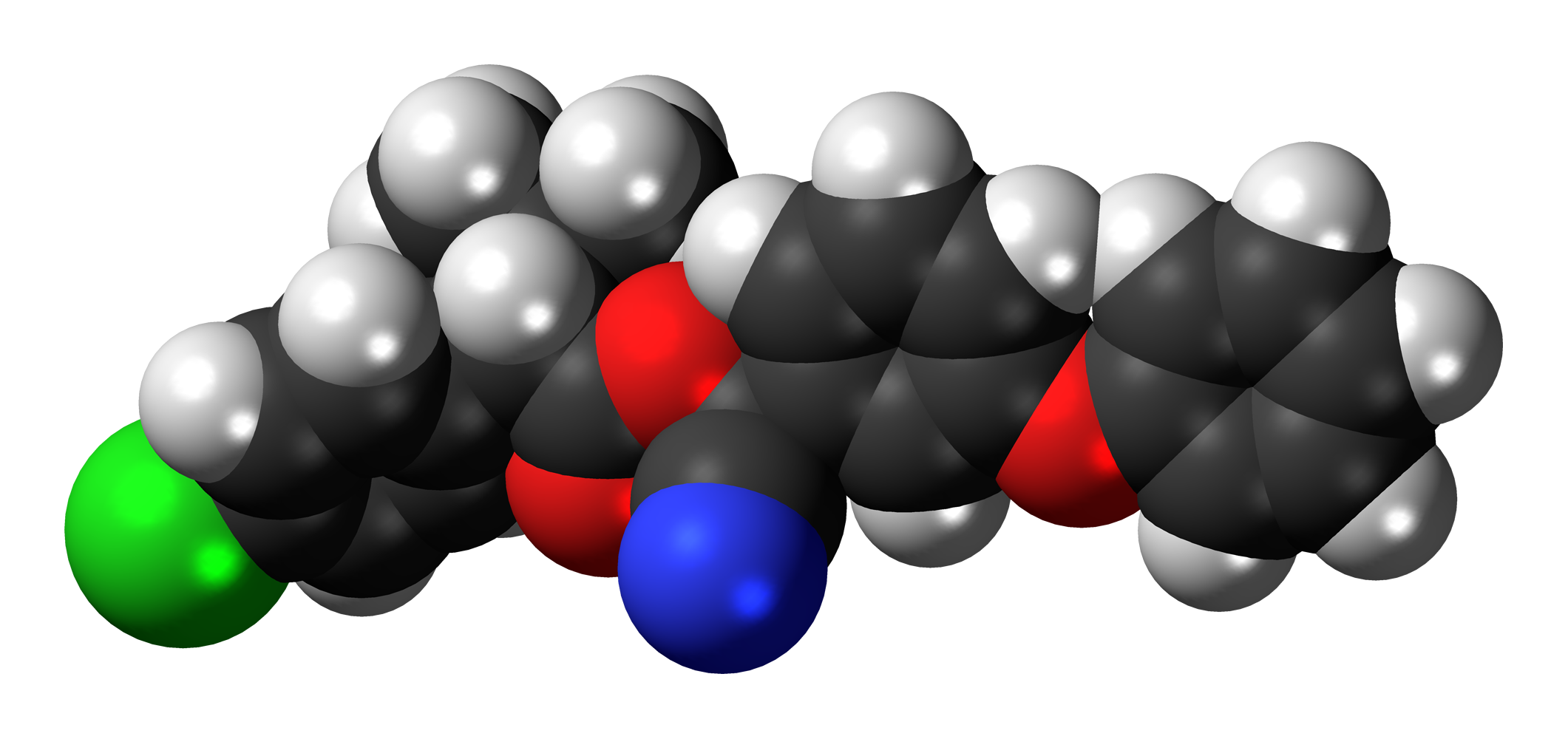

Names
- IUPAC name (RS)-alpha-Cyano-3-phenoxybenzyl (RS)-2-(4-chlorophenyl)-3-methylbutyrate

Identifiers
CAS Number	51630-58-1
3D model (JSmol)	Interactive image
ChEBI	CHEBI:5014
ChEMBL	ChEMBL492491
ChemSpider	3230
ECHA InfoCard	100.052.098
KEGG	C10988
PubChem CID	3347
RTECS number	CY 1576350
UNII	Z6MXZ39302
CompTox Dashboard (EPA)	DTXSID101017940 DTXSID3020621, DTXSID101017940
- InChI: InChI=1S/C25H22ClNO3/c1-17(2)24(18-11-13-20(26)14-12-18)25(28)30-23(16-27)19-7-6-10-22(15-19)29-21-8-4-3-5-9-21/h3-15,17,23-24H,1-2H3 Key: NYPJDWWKZLNGGM-UHFFFAOYSA-N; InChI=1/C25H22ClNO3/c1-17(2)24(18-11-13-20(26)14-12-18)25(28)30-23(16-27)19-7-6-10-22(15-19)29-21-8-4-3-5-9-21/h3-15,17,23-24H,1-2H3 Key: NYPJDWWKZLNGGM-UHFFFAOYAU
- SMILES: Clc1ccc(cc1)C(C(=O)OC(C#N)c3cccc(Oc2ccccc2)c3)C(C)C

Properties
Chemical formula	C_{25}H_{22}ClNO_{3}
Molar mass	419.91 g·mol^{−1}
Appearance	Yellow-brown viscous liquid
Density	1.175 g/cm^{3}
Solubility in water	2 μg/L

Pharmacology
ATCvet code	QP53AC14 (WHO) QP53AX02 (WHO)
- Except where otherwise noted, data are given for materials in their standard state (at 25 °C [77 °F], 100 kPa). verify (what is ?) Infobox references

Fenvalerate is a synthetic pyrethroid insecticide. It is a mixture of four optical isomers which have different insecticidal activities. The 2-S alpha (or SS) configuration, known as esfenvalerate, is the most insecticidally active isomer. Fenvalerate consists of about 23% of this isomer.

Fenvalerate is an insecticide of moderate mammalian toxicity. In laboratory animals, central nervous system toxicity is observed following acute or short-term exposure. Fenvalerate has applications against a wide range of pests including some of the more destructive such as the Helicoverpa assulta. Residue levels are minimized by low application rates. Fenvalerate is most toxic to bees and fish. It is found in some emulsifiable concentrates, ULV, wettable powders, slow release formulations, insecticidal fogs, and granules. It is most commonly used to control insects in food, feed, and cotton products, and for the control of flies and ticks in barns and stables. Fenvalerate does not affect plants, but is active for an extended period of time.

Fenvalerate may irritate the skin and eyes on contact, and is also harmful if swallowed.
