= Cyfluthrin =

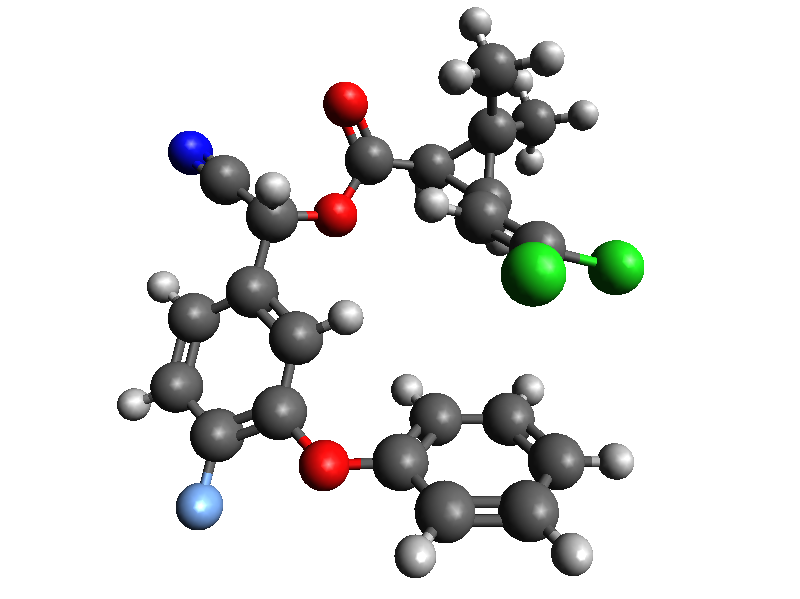

Names
- Preferred IUPAC name (R)-Cyano(4-fluoro-3-phenoxyphenyl)methyl (1R,3R)-3-(2,2-dichloroethen-1-yl)-2,2-dimethylcyclopropane-1-carboxylate

Identifiers
CAS Number	68359-37-5
3D model (JSmol)	Interactive image
ChEMBL	ChEMBL2104608
ChemSpider	45482
ECHA InfoCard	100.063.485
KEGG	C10982
PubChem CID	50153
UNII	SCM2QLZ6S0
CompTox Dashboard (EPA)	DTXSID5035957
- InChI: InChI=1S/C22H18Cl2FNO3/c1-22(2)15(11-19(23)24)20(22)21(27)29-18(12-26)13-8-9-16(25)17(10-13)28-14-6-4-3-5-7-14/h3-11,15,18,20H,1-2H3/t15-,18-,20-/m0/s1 Key: QQODLKZGRKWIFG-QSFXBCCZSA-N; InChI=1/C22H18Cl2FNO3/c1-22(2)15(11-19(23)24)20(22)21(27)29-18(12-26)13-8-9-16(25)17(10-13)28-14-6-4-3-5-7-14/h3-11,15,18,20H,1-2H3/t15-,18-,20-/m0/s1 Key: QQODLKZGRKWIFG-QSFXBCCZBF
- SMILES: Cl/C(Cl)=C/[C@H]3[C@@H](C(=O)O[C@@H](C#N)c2ccc(F)c(Oc1ccccc1)c2)C3(C)C

Properties
Chemical formula	C_{22}H_{18}Cl_{2}FNO_{3}
Molar mass	434.29 g·mol^{−1}
Melting point	60 °C (140 °F; 333 K)
Solubility in water	2 μg/L

Pharmacology
ATC code	P03BA01 (WHO) QP53AC12 (WHO)
- Except where otherwise noted, data are given for materials in their standard state (at 25 °C [77 °F], 100 kPa). verify (what is ?) Infobox references

Cyfluthrin is a pyrethroid insecticide and common household pesticide. It is a complex organic compound and the commercial product is sold as a mixture of isomers. Like most pyrethroids (MoA 3a), it is highly toxic to fish and invertebrates, but it is far less toxic to humans. It is generally supplied as a 10–25% liquid concentrate for commercial use and is diluted prior to spraying onto agricultural crops and outbuildings.

== Preparation ==
Cyfluthrin can be synthesized from 5-methyl- or 5-carboxy-2-fluorobromobenzene.

== Properties ==
Cyfluthrin is a flammable solid that is colorless in its pure form but otherwise brown, and is practically insoluble in water. The commercial product is often a brownish, oily liquid with an aromatic odor. In water and air, it degrades via 4-fluoro-3-phenoxybenzaldehyde to 4-fluoro-3-phenoxybenzoic acid.

=== Stereoisomerism ===
Commercial cyfluthrin consists of a mixture of four diastereomeric pairs of enantiomers (i.e., eight isomers), comprising two pairs of cis isomers and two pairs of trans isomers. Cyfluthrin is typically produced with a purity of 92% (total of all isomers), and six additional impurities can be identified.

Unlike cyfluthrin, beta-cyfluthrin consists of only two pairs of enantiomers.

Compound	CAS number	Cyfluthrin [%]	Beta-cyfluthrin [%]
(1R,3R,αR) + (1S,3S,αS) = 1:1; cis	86560-92-1	23–27	< 2
(1R,3R,αS) + (1S,3S,αR) = 1:1; cis	86560-93-2	17–21	30–40
(1R,3S,αR) + (1S,3R,αS) = 1:1; trans	86560-94-3	32–36	< 3
(1R,3S,αS) + (1S,3R,αR) = 1:1; trans	86560-95-4	21–25	53–67

== Uses ==
Cyfluthrin is used as an active ingredient in plant protection products and wood preservatives and belongs to the pyrethroid group.

== Safety ==
In rats, the LD_{50}s for cyfluthrin are 500, 800 (oral), and 600 (skin) mg/kg. Excessive exposure can cause nausea, headache, muscle weakness, salivation, shortness of breath and seizures. In humans, it is deactivated by enzymatic hydrolysis to several carboxylic acid metabolites, whose urinary excretion half-lives are in a range of 5–7 hours. Worker exposure to the chemical can be monitored by measurement of the urinary metabolites, while severe overdosage may be confirmed by quantification of cyfluthrin in blood or plasma.

Health and safety risks are controlled by right to know laws that exist in most developed countries. Cyfluthrin is regulated in the US by the EPA.

== Approval ==
Cyfluthrin was first approved in the United States in 1981.It is not approved in EU member states, including Germany and Austria. No pesticides containing this active ingredient are available in Switzerland either. Nevertheless, cyfluthrin may be manufactured in the EU for export.

Beta-cyfluthrin was approved as an active ingredient in many EU countries, including Austria and Germany. Its approval expired on October 31, 2020, due to various concerns raised by the European regulatory authority, including its use in greenhouses for tomato cultivation and the sowing of beet seeds treated with beta-cyfluthrin. No plant protection products containing beta-cyfluthrin are available on the Swiss market.

The European Pharmacopoeia sets the limit for cyfluthrin residues in herbal drugs at 0.1 mg·kg^{−1}, i.e., 0.1 ppm.

== See also ==
- Cyhalothrin
- Imiprothrin
