= Etofenprox =

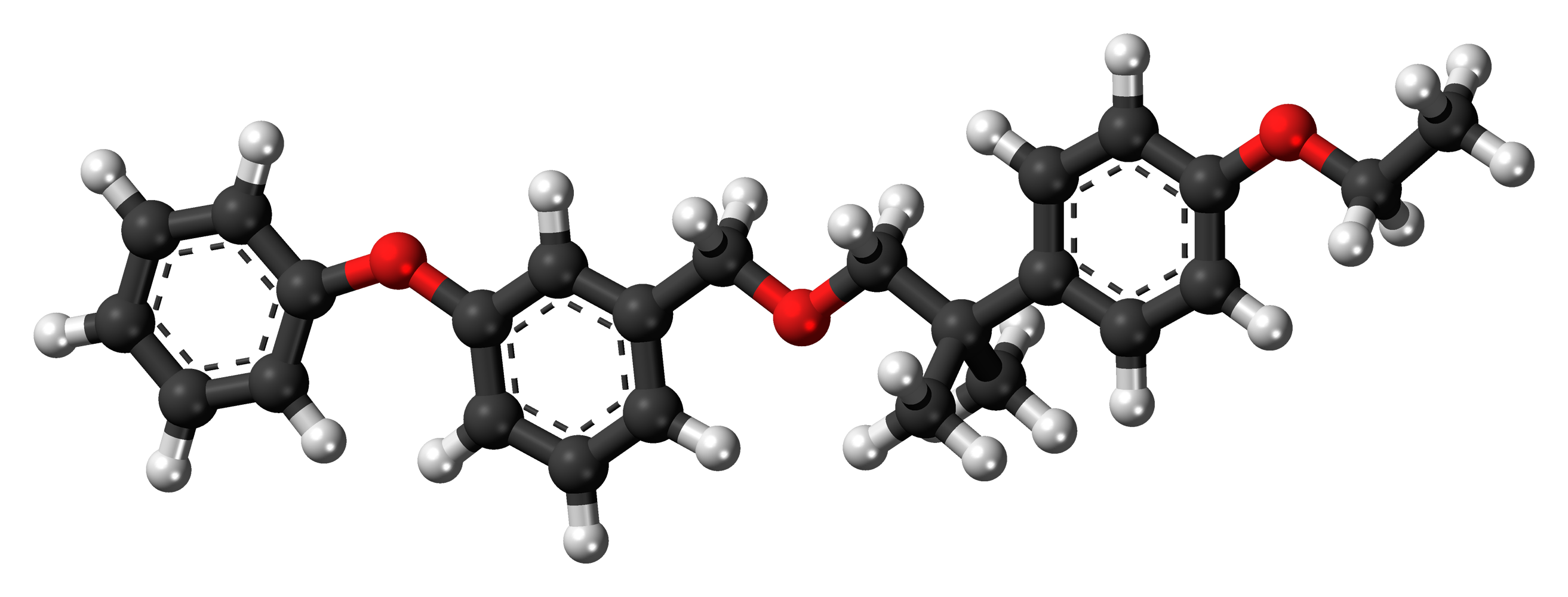

Names
- Preferred IUPAC name 1-{[2-(4-Ethoxyphenyl)-2-methylpropoxy]methyl}-3-phenoxybenzene
- Other names Ethofenprox, MTI-500, Trebon, Zenivex

Identifiers
CAS Number	80844-07-1
3D model (JSmol)	Interactive image
ChEBI	CHEBI:39348
ChEMBL	ChEMBL2105573
ChemSpider	64377
ECHA InfoCard	100.100.942
KEGG	D09202
PubChem CID	71245
UNII	0LD7P9153C
CompTox Dashboard (EPA)	DTXSID9032610
- InChI: InChI=1S/C25H28O3/c1-4-27-22-15-13-21(14-16-22)25(2,3)19-26-18-20-9-8-12-24(17-20)28-23-10-6-5-7-11-23/h5-17H,4,18-19H2,1-3H3 Key: YREQHYQNNWYQCJ-UHFFFAOYSA-N; InChI=1/C25H28O3/c1-4-27-22-15-13-21(14-16-22)25(2,3)19-26-18-20-9-8-12-24(17-20)28-23-10-6-5-7-11-23/h5-17H,4,18-19H2,1-3H3 Key: YREQHYQNNWYQCJ-UHFFFAOYAW
- SMILES: O(c1ccccc1)c2cc(ccc2)COCC(c3ccc(OCC)cc3)(C)C

Properties
Chemical formula	C_{25}H_{28}O_{3}
Molar mass	376.496 g·mol^{−1}
Appearance	White (pure) or amber (man.)
Density	1.172 g/cm^{3} at 20.7 °C
Melting point	37.4 °C (99.3 °F; 310.5 K)
Boiling point	Degradation at about 200 °C

Hazards
Flash point	> 110 °C (230 °F; 383 K)
- Except where otherwise noted, data are given for materials in their standard state (at 25 °C [77 °F], 100 kPa). verify (what is ?) Infobox references

Etofenprox is a pyrethroid derivative which is used as an insecticide. Mitsui Chemicals Agro Inc. is the main manufacturer of the chemical. It is also used as an ingredient in flea medication for cats and dogs.

== General uses ==
Etofenprox is an insecticide which disturbs insect nervous systems following direct contact or ingestion, and which is active against a broad spectrum of insects. It is used in agriculture, horticulture, viticulture, forestry, animal health and public health against many insect pests, for instance Lepidoptera, Hemiptera, Coleoptera, Diptera, Thysanoptera, and Hymenoptera. In agriculture, etofenprox is used on a broad range of crops such as rice, fruits, vegetables, corn, soybeans, and tea. It is poorly absorbed by roots and little translocation occurs within plants.

In the public health sector, etofenprox is used for vector control either by direct application in infested areas or indirectly by impregnating fabrics, such as mosquito nets. Etofenprox is used at low volumes to control adult mosquitoes, non-biting midges, and biting and non-biting flies. Etofenprox is used undiluted for ultra low volume aerosol applications or diluted with a diluent such as mineral oil for direct applications, for the control of pest species in or near residential, industrial, commercial, urban, recreational areas, woodlands, golf courses, and other areas where these pests are a problem.

== Hazards to humans and domestic animals ==
Etofenprox is harmful if swallowed and causes moderate eye irritation. Contact with eyes, skin or clothing should be avoided. Repeated exposure to etofenprox can cause skin irritation. LD_{50}s are >2000 mg/kg (acute oral, rat), >2000 mg/kg (acute dermal, rat), and >5.88 mg/L (acute inhalation, rat). In rabbits, it is not a skin irritant or eye irritant. It did not cause skin sensitization in guinea pig (intradermal and topical).

== Environmental hazards ==
This pesticide is toxic to aquatic organisms, including fish and aquatic invertebrates. Runoff from treated areas or deposition into bodies of water may be hazardous to fish and other aquatic organisms. Etofenprox is highly toxic to bees exposed to direct treatment on blooming crops or weeds. Applications should be timed to provide the maximum possible interval between treatment and the next period of bee activity.

== Environmental persistence ==
Etofenprox is decomposed in soil by anaerobic and aerobic microorganisms. In sterilized soil, little degradation took place in a 56-day test. The principle metabolites do not accumulate and degrade to CO_{2}. Etofenprox's half-life in aerobic soil is between 7 and 25 days. One study showed it to have a half-life of 3 weeks on bean leaves. Another study showed it to have a half-life of 1 week on rice plants.

== Physical and chemical hazards ==
Etofenprox is combustible and should not be used or stored near heat or open flame.
