= Deltamethrin =

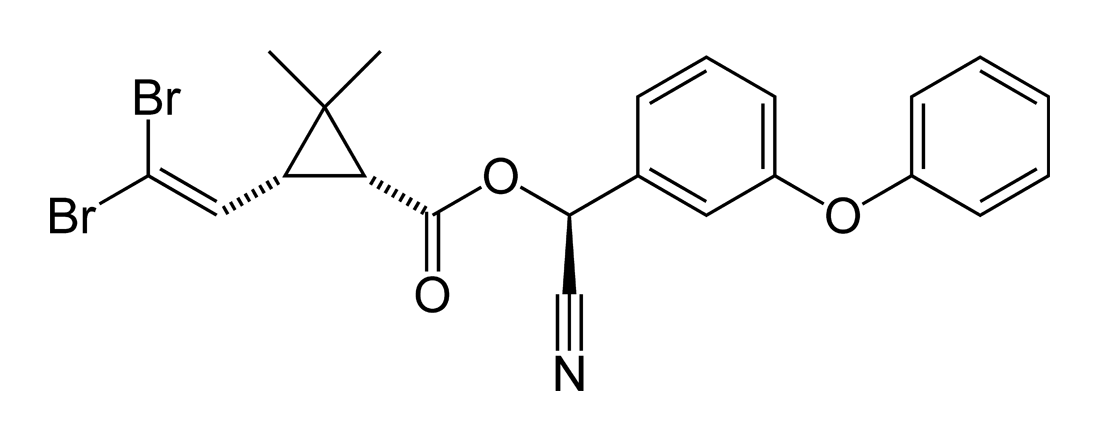
- Deltamethrin

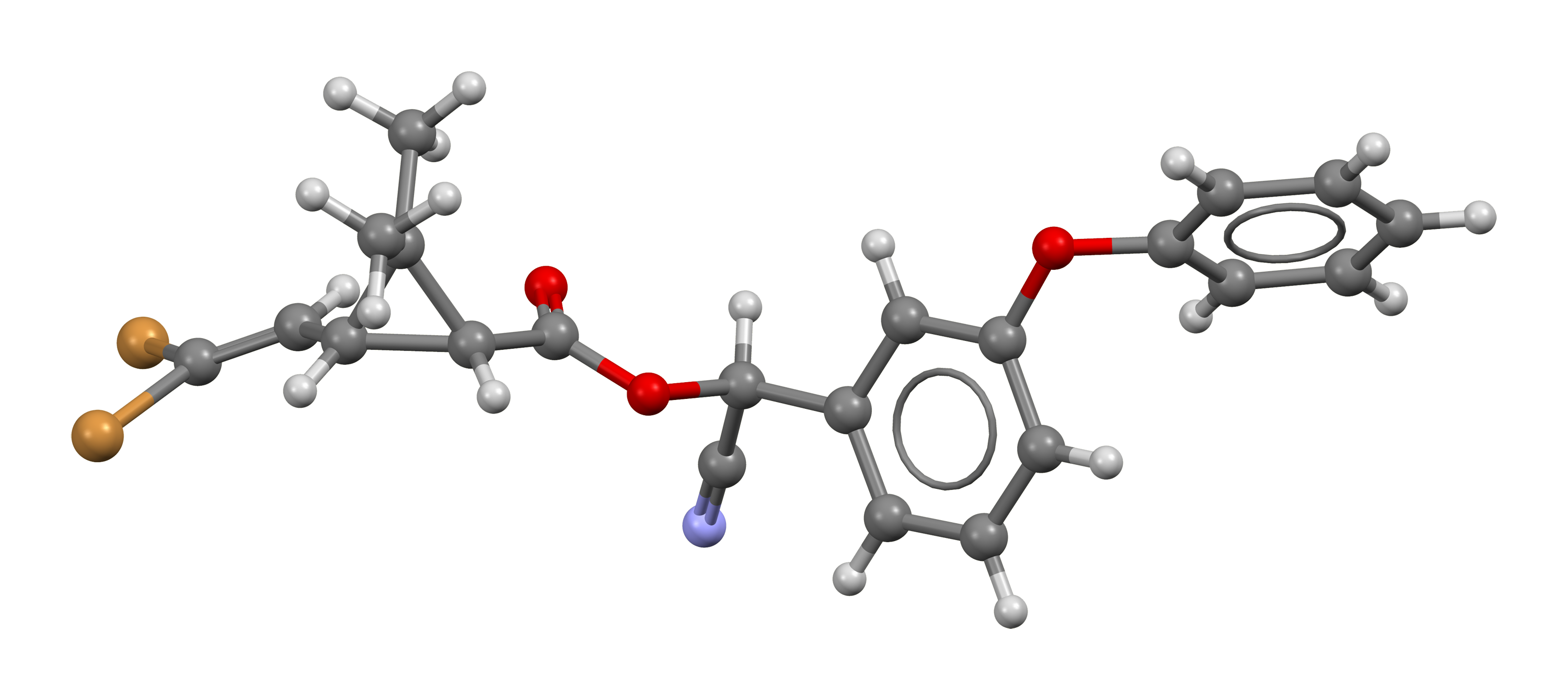
- Deltamethrin

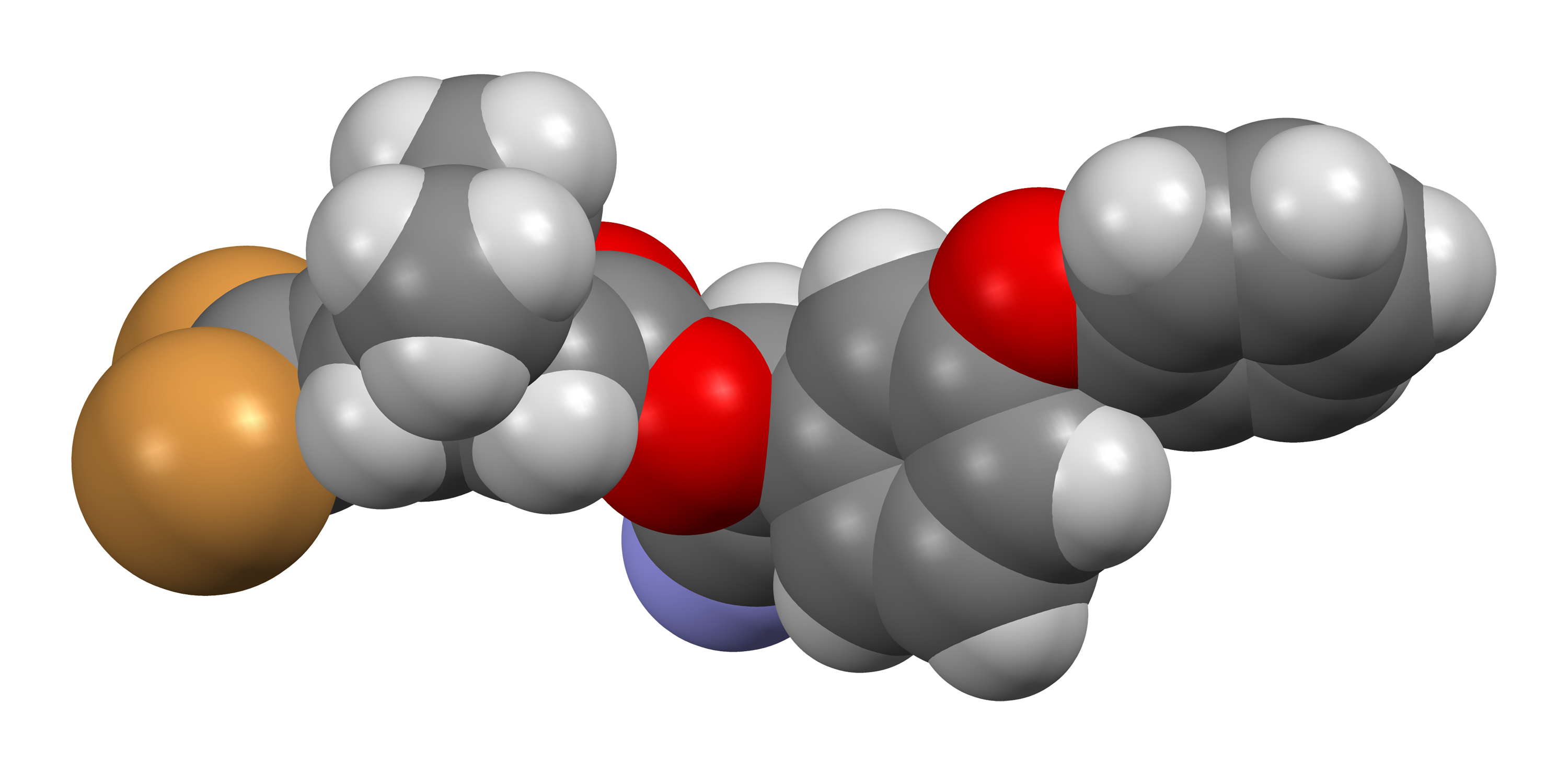

Names
- Preferred IUPAC name (S)-Cyano(3-phenoxyphenyl)methyl (1R,3R)-3-(2,2-dibromoethen-1-yl)-2,2-dimethylcyclopropane-1-carboxylate
- Other names: Decamethrin; Decis; Delta dust; DeltaGard

Identifiers
CAS Number	52918-63-5
3D model (JSmol)	Interactive image
Beilstein Reference	6746312
ChEBI	CHEBI:4388
ChEMBL	ChEMBL1593566
ChemSpider	37079
ECHA InfoCard	100.052.943
EC Number	258-256-6
KEGG	D07785
PubChem CID	40585
RTECS number	GZ1233000
UNII	2JTS8R821G
UN number	3349
CompTox Dashboard (EPA)	DTXSID8020381
- InChI: InChI=1S/C22H19Br2NO3/c1-22(2)17(12-19(23)24)20(22)21(26)28-18(13-25)14-7-6-10-16(11-14)27-15-8-4-3-5-9-15/h3-12,17-18,20H,1-2H3/t17-,18+,20-/m0/s1 Key: OWZREIFADZCYQD-NSHGMRRFSA-N; InChI=1/C22H19Br2NO3/c1-22(2)17(12-19(23)24)20(22)21(26)28-18(13-25)14-7-6-10-16(11-14)27-15-8-4-3-5-9-15/h3-12,17-18,20H,1-2H3/t17-,18+,20-/m0/s1 Key: OWZREIFADZCYQD-NSHGMRRFBN
- SMILES: N#C[C@H](c1cccc(c1)Oc1ccccc1)OC(=O)[C@@H]1[C@@H](C1(C)C)C=C(Br)Br

Properties
Chemical formula	C_{22}H_{19}Br_{2}NO_{3}
Molar mass	505.206 g·mol^{−1}
Density	1.5 g cm^{−3}
Melting point	98 °C (208 °F; 371 K)
Boiling point	300 °C (572 °F; 573 K)

Pharmacology
ATC code	P03BA03 (WHO) QP53AC11 (WHO)

Hazards
- GHS labelling
Pictograms	(GHS06: Toxic) (GHS09: Environmental hazard)
Signal word	Danger
Hazard statements	H301, H331, H410
Precautionary statements	P261, P264, P270, P271, P273, P301+P310, P304+P340, P311, P321, P330, P391, P403+P233, P405, P501
- Except where otherwise noted, data are given for materials in their standard state (at 25 °C [77 °F], 100 kPa). verify (what is ?) Infobox references

Deltamethrin is a pyrethroid ester insecticide. Deltamethrin plays a key role in controlling malaria vectors, and is used in the manufacture of long-lasting insecticidal mosquito nets; however, resistance of mosquitos and bed bugs to deltamethrin has seen a widespread increase.

Deltamethrin is toxic to aquatic life, particularly fish. Although generally considered safe to use around humans, it is still neurotoxic. It is an allergen and causes asthma in some people.

== Usage ==
Deltamethrin is a highly effective insecticide. It is used, among other applications, for the production of long-lasting insecticidal nets (LLINs), which, along with indoor residual spraying (IRS), are the main vector control strategies recommended by the World Health Organization (WHO) for the management of malaria.

Deltamethrin plays a key role in controlling malaria vectors, and is used in the manufacture of long-lasting insecticidal mosquito nets. It is used as one of a battery of pyrethroid insecticides in control of malarial vectors, particularly Anopheles gambiae, and whilst being the most employed pyrethroid insecticide, can be used in conjunction with, or as an alternative to, permethrin, cypermethrin and organophosphate-based insecticides, such as malathion and fenthion. Resistance to deltamethrin (and its counterparts) is now extremely widespread and threatens the success of worldwide vector control programmes.

== Production ==
Deltamethrin is a pyrethroid composed of a single stereoisomer, of a possible 8 stereoisomers, selectively prepared by the esterification of (1R,3R)- or cis-2,2-dimethyl-3-(2,2-dibromovinyl)cyclopropanecarboxylic acid with (alpha,S)- or (+)-alpha-cyano-3-phenoxybenzyl alcohol or by selective recrystallization of the racemic esters obtained by esterification of the (1R,3R)- or cis-acid with the racemic or (alpha-R, alpha-S, or alpha-R/S)- or + or − alcohol.

== Resistance ==
Resistance has been identified in several insects, including important vectors of malaria like the mosquito Anopheles gambiae as well as non-disease carrying pests like bed bugs.

=== Mosquitoes ===
Methods of resistance include thickening of the cuticle of the insect to limit permeation of the insecticide, metabolic resistance via overexpression of metabolizing cytochrome P450 mono-oxygenases and glutathione-S-transferases, and the knockdown resistance (kdr) sodium channel mutations which render the action of insecticides ineffectual, even when co-administered with piperonyl butoxide. Characterization of the different forms of resistance among mosquitoes has become a top priority in groups studying tropical medicine due to the high mortality of those who reside in endemic areas.

=== Bed bugs ===
Two mutations, the valine to leucine mutation (V419L) and the leucine to isoleucine mutation (L925I) in voltage-gated sodium channel α-subunit gene, have been identified as responsible for knockdown resistance to deltamethrin in bed bugs. One study found that 88% of bed bug populations in the US had at least one of the two mutations, if not both, meaning that deltamethrin resistance among bed bugs is currently making this insecticide obsolete.

== Side effects ==
Deltamethrin belongs to a group of pesticides called synthetic pyrethroids. This pesticide is toxic to aquatic life, particularly fish, and therefore must be used with extreme caution around water.

=== In humans ===
Although generally considered safe to use, it is neurotoxic to humans in high doses. Pyrethroids like deltamethrin can also be an allergen that provokes asthma in some people.

Deltamethrin temporarily attacks the nervous system of any animal with which it comes into contact. Skin contact can lead to tingling or reddening of the skin local to the application. If taken in through the eyes or mouth, the most common symptom is facial paraesthesia, which can feel like many different abnormal sensations, including burning, partial numbness, "pins and needles", skin crawling, etc. There is one case report describing chronic intoxication from pyrethroid insecticides leading to a syndrome clinically similar to motor neuron disease. There are no antidotes, and treatment must be symptomatic, as approved by a physician. Over time, deltamethrin is metabolized, with a rapid loss of toxicity, and passed from the body. A poison control center should be contacted in the event of an accidental poisoning.

Deltamethrin is able to pass from a woman's skin through her blood and into her breast milk, although breastfeeding remains safe under prevailing conditions. In South Africa, residues of deltamethrin were found in breast milk, together with DDT, in an area that used DDT treatment for malaria control, as well as pyrethroids in small-scale agriculture.

A 2015 study conducted in Brittany, France, found a negative correlation between deltamethrin exposure (measured through the presence of a metabolite in urine) and cognitive scores in infants.

=== In domestic animals ===
Cases of toxicity have been observed in cattle, following use of agricultural deltamethrin preparation in external application for tick control.
