= Knockdown resistance =

Knockdown resistance, also called kdr, describes cases of resistance to diphenylethane (e.g. DDT) and pyrethroid insecticides in insects and other arthropods that result from reduced sensitivity of the nervous system caused by point mutations in the insect population's genetic makeup. Such mutative resistance is characterized by the presence of kdr alleles in the insect's genome. Knockdown resistance, first identified and characterized in the house fly (Musca domestica) in the 1950s, remains a threat to the continued usefulness of pyrethroids in the control of many pest species. Research since 1990 has provided a wealth of new information on the molecular basis of knockdown resistance.
