= Imiprothrin =

Names
- Preferred IUPAC name [2,5-Dioxo-3-(prop-2-yn-1-yl)imidazolidin-1-yl]methyl 2,2-dimethyl-3-(2-methylprop-1-en-1-yl)cyclopropane-1-carboxylate
- Other names Pralle; Multicide

Identifiers
CAS Number	72963-72-5
3D model (JSmol)	Interactive image
ChEBI	CHEBI:39389
ChemSpider	110211
ECHA InfoCard	100.106.762
EC Number	615-873-9
KEGG	D01889
PubChem CID	123622
UNII	73OFA861WY
CompTox Dashboard (EPA)	DTXSID8034669
- InChI: InChI=1S/C17H22N2O4/c1-6-7-18-9-13(20)19(16(18)22)10-23-15(21)14-12(8-11(2)3)17(14,4)5/h1,8,12,14H,7,9-10H2,2-5H3 Key: VPRAQYXPZIFIOH-UHFFFAOYSA-N
- SMILES: O=C(OCN1C(=O)CN(C1=O)CC#C)C2C(\C=C(/C)C)C2(C)C

Properties
Chemical formula	C_{17}H_{22}N_{2}O_{4}
Molar mass	318.373 g·mol^{−1}
Appearance	Golden yellow liquid
Odor	Slightly sweet
Density	0.979 g/mL

Hazards
- GHS labelling
Pictograms	(GHS07: Exclamation mark) (GHS09: Environmental hazard)
Signal word	Warning
Hazard statements	H302, H410
Precautionary statements	P264, P270, P273, P301+P312, P330, P391, P501
Flash point	110 °C (230 °F; 383 K)
- Except where otherwise noted, data are given for materials in their standard state (at 25 °C [77 °F], 100 kPa). verify (what is ?) Infobox references

Imiprothrin is a synthetic pyrethroid insecticide. It is an ingredient in some commercial and consumer insecticide products for indoor use. It has low acute toxicity to humans through the inhalation and dermal routes, but to insects it acts as a neurotoxin causing paralysis. It is effective against cockroaches, waterbugs, ants, silverfish, crickets and spiders, among others.
