= Resmethrin =

Names
- IUPAC names (5-benzylfuran-3-yl)methyl (2R)-2,2-dimethyl-3-(2-methylprop-1-en-1-yl)cyclopropane-1-carboxylate; 5-benzyl-3-[({[(3R)-2,2-dimethyl-3-(2-methylprop-1-en-1-yl) cyclopropyl]carbonyl}oxy)methyl]furan; (5-Benzyl-3-furyl)methyl-2,2-dimethyl-3-(2-methyl-1-propen-1-yl)cyclopropancarboxylate; 5-benzyl-3-furylmethyl (1RS,3RS;1RS,3SR)-2,2-dimethyl-3-(2-methylprop-1-enyl)cyclopropanecarboxylate; 5-benzyl-3-furylmethyl(1RS)-cis-trans-2,2-dimethyl-3-(2-methylprop-1-enyl)cyclopropanecarboxylate; 5-benzyl-3-furylmethyl(±)-cis-trans-chrysanthemate
- Other names [5-(phenylmethyl)-3-furanyl]methyl 2,2-dimethyl-3-(2-methyl-1-propen-1-yl)cyclopropanecarboxylate

Identifiers
CAS Number	10453-86-8; 28434-01-7 (Bioresmethrin)
3D model (JSmol)	Interactive image
ChEBI	CHEBI:8811
ChEMBL	ChEMBL2106605
ChemSpider	19952179
ECHA InfoCard	100.030.842
EC Number	233-940-7
KEGG	C10991
PubChem CID	5053
RTECS number	GZ1310000
UNII	Z6PN6KTG4K; YPP8YQZ13B (Bioresmethrin)
UN number	3082 3349 2902
CompTox Dashboard (EPA)	DTXSID7022253
- InChI: InChI=1S/C22H26O3/c1-15(2)10-19-20(22(19,3)4)21(23)25-14-17-12-18(24-13-17)11-16-8-6-5-7-9-16/h5-10,12-13,19-20H,11,14H2,1-4H3/t19-,20?/m1/s1 Key: VEMKTZHHVJILDY-FIWHBWSRSA-N; InChI=1/C22H26O3/c1-15(2)10-19-20(22(19,3)4)21(23)25-14-17-12-18(24-13-17)11-16-8-6-5-7-9-16/h5-10,12-13,19-20H,11,14H2,1-4H3/t19-,20?/m1/s1 Key: VEMKTZHHVJILDY-FIWHBWSRBD
- SMILES: O=C(OCc2cc(Cc1ccccc1)oc2)C3[C@@H](/C=C(\C)C)C3(C)C

Properties
Chemical formula	C_{22}H_{26}O_{3}
Molar mass	338.44 g/mol

Pharmacology
ATC code	None
Legal status	AU: S6 (Poison) / Schedule 5

Hazards
- GHS labelling
Pictograms	(GHS07: Exclamation mark) (GHS09: Environmental hazard)
Signal word	Warning
Hazard statements	H302, H410
Precautionary statements	P264, P270, P273, P301+P312, P330, P391, P501
- Except where otherwise noted, data are given for materials in their standard state (at 25 °C [77 °F], 100 kPa). verify (what is ?) Infobox references

Resmethrin is a pyrethroid insecticide with many uses, including control of the adult mosquito population.

The resmethrin molecule has four stereoisomers determined by cis-trans orientation around a carbon triangle and chirality. Technical resmethrin is a mixture of (1R,trans)-, (1R,cis)-, (1S,trans)-, and (1S,cis)- isomers, typically in a ratio of 4:1:4:1. The 1R isomers (both trans and cis) show strong insecticidal activity, while the 1S isomers do not. The (1R,trans)- isomer is also known as bioresmethrin,(+)-trans-resmethrin, or d-trans-resmethrin; although bioresmethrin has been used alone as a pesticide active ingredient, it is not now registered as a separate active ingredient (AI) by the U.S. EPA. The (1R,cis)- isomer is known as cismethrin, but this is also not registered in the U.S. for use alone as a pesticide AI.

Commercial trade names for products that contain resmethrin are: Chrysron, Crossfire, Lethalaire V-26, Pynosect, Raid Flying Insect Killer, Scourge, SPB-1382, Sun-Bugger #4, Synthrin, Syntox, Vectrin, and Whitmire PT-110.
