= Pyrethroid =

Class of insecticides

Chemical structure of allethrin isomers

Chemical structure of permethrin isomers

A pyrethroid is an organic compound similar to the natural pyrethrins, which are produced by the flowers of pyrethrums (Chrysanthemum cinerariaefolium and C. coccineum). Pyrethroids are used as commercial and household insecticides.

In household concentrations pyrethroids are generally harmless to humans. However, pyrethroids are toxic to insects such as bees, dragonflies, mayflies, gadflies, and some other invertebrates, including those that constitute the base of aquatic and terrestrial food webs. Pyrethroids are toxic to aquatic organisms, especially fish. They have been shown to be an effective control measure for malaria outbreaks, through indoor applications.

== Mode of action ==
Pyrethroids are excitotoxic to axons. They act by preventing the closure of the voltage-gated sodium channels in the axonal membranes. The sodium channel is a membrane protein with a hydrophilic interior. This interior is shaped precisely to allow sodium ions to pass through the membrane, enter the axon, and propagate an action potential. When the toxin keeps the channels in their open state, the nerves cannot repolarize, leaving the axonal membrane permanently depolarized, thereby paralyzing the organism. Pyrethroids can be combined with the synergist piperonyl butoxide, a known inhibitor of microsomal P450 enzymes which are important in metabolizing the pyrethroid. By that means, the efficacy (lethality) of the pyrethroid is increased. It is likely that there are other mechanisms of intoxication also. Disruption of neuroendocrine activity is thought to contribute to their irreversible effects on insects, which indicates a pyrethroid action on voltage-gated calcium channels (and perhaps other voltage-gated channels more widely).

== Chemistry and classification ==
(1R,3R)- or (+)-trans-chrysanthemic acid.

Pyrethroids are classified based on their mechanism of biological action, as they do not share a common chemical structure. Many are 2,2-dimethylcyclopropanecarboxylic acid derivatives, like chrysanthemic acid, esterified with an alcohol. However, the cyclopropyl ring does not occur in all pyrethroids. Fenvalerate, which was developed in 1972, is one such example and was the first commercialized pyrethroid without that group.

Pyrethroids which lack an α-cyano group are often classified as type I pyrethroids and those with it are called type II pyrethroids. Pyrethroids that have a common name starting with "cy" have a cyano group and are type II. Fenvalerate also contains an α-cyano group.

Some pyrethroids, like etofenprox, also lack the ester bond found in most other pyrethroids and have an ether bond in its place. Silafluofen is also classified as a pyrethroid and has a silicon atom in the place of the ester. Pyrethroids often have chiral centers and only certain stereoisomers work efficiently as insecticides.

== Examples ==
- Allethrin, the first pyrethroid synthesized
- Bifenthrin, active ingredient of Talstar, Capture, Ortho Home Defense Max, and Bifenthrine
- Cyfluthrin, an active ingredient in Baygon, Temprid, Fumakilla Vape Aerosol, Tempo SC, and many more, dichlorovinyl derivative of pyrethrin
- Cypermethrin, including the resolved isomer alpha-cypermethrin, dichlorovinyl derivative of pyrethrin. Commonly found in crawling insect killers and some mosquito sprays.
- Cyphenothrin, active ingredient of K2000 Insect spray sold in Israel. Mostly used in some aerosols as a Cypermethrin substitute in developing countries.
- Deltamethrin, dibromovinyl derivative of pyrethrin
- Dimefluthrin
- Esfenvalerate
- Etofenprox
- Fenpropathrin
- Fenvalerate
- Flucythrinate
- Flumethrin
- Imiprothrin
- lambda-Cyhalothrin
- Metofluthrin
- Permethrin, dichlorovinyl derivative of pyrethrin and most widely used pyrethroid.
- Phenothrin (Sumithrin), active ingredient of Anvil
- Prallethrin
- Resmethrin, active ingredient of Scourge
- Silafluofen
- tau-Fluvalinate
- Tefluthrin
- Tetramethrin
- Tralomethrin
- Transfluthrin, an active ingredient in Baygon and other products.

== Safety ==
=== Environmental effects ===
Pyrethroids are toxic to insects such as bees, dragonflies, mayflies, gadflies, and some other invertebrates, including those that constitute the base of aquatic and terrestrial food webs. They are toxic to aquatic organisms including fish.

Pyrethroids are usually broken apart by sunlight and the atmosphere in one or two days. However, when associated with sediment, they can persist for some time.

Pyrethroids are unaffected by conventional secondary treatment systems at municipal wastewater treatment facilities. They appear in the effluent, usually at levels lethal to invertebrates.

=== Humans ===
Pyrethroid absorption can happen via skin, inhalation or ingestion. Pyrethroids often do not bind efficiently to mammalian sodium channels. They also absorb poorly via skin and human liver is often able to metabolize them relatively efficiently. Pyrethroids are thus much less toxic to humans without liver problems than to insects.

It is not well established if chronic exposure to small amounts of pyrethroids is hazardous or not. However, large doses can cause acute poisoning, which is rarely life threatening. Typical symptoms include facial paresthesia, itching, burning, dizziness, nausea, vomiting and more severe cases of muscle twitching. Severe poisoning is often caused by ingestion of pyrethroids and can result in a variety of symptoms like seizures, coma, bleeding or pulmonary edema. There is an association of pyrethroids with poorer early social-emotional and language development.

=== Other organisms ===
Pyrethroids are very toxic to cats, but not to dogs. Poisoning in cats can result in seizures, fever, ataxia and even death. Poisoning can occur if pyrethroid containing flea treatment products, which are intended for dogs, are used on cats. The livers of cats detoxify pyrethroids via glucuronidation more poorly than dogs, which is the cause of this difference. Aside from cats, pyrethroids are typically not toxic to mammals or birds. They are often toxic to fish, reptiles and amphibians.

== Resistance ==
The use of pyrethroids as insecticides has led to the development of widespread resistance to them among some insect populations, especially mosquitoes.

Pyrethroids have been used against bedbugs, but resistant populations have developed to them. Populations of diamondback moths have also commonly developed resistance to pyrethroids – including in U.S. states North Dakota and Wisconsin while pyrethroids are still recommended in California. Various mosquito populations have been discovered to have a high level of resistance, including Anopheles gambiae s.l. in West Africa by Chandre et al 1999 through Pwalia et al 2019, A. arabiensis in Sudan by Ismail et al 2018 and The Gambia by Opondo et al 2019, and Aedes aegypti in South East Asia by Amelia-Yap et al 2018, Papua New Guinea by Demok et al 2019, and various other locations by Smith et al 2016.

Knockdown resistance (kdr) is one of the stronger kinds of resistance. kdr mutations confer target-site resistance to DDT and pyrethroids and cross-resistance to DDT. Most kdr mutations are within or proximate to the two arthropod sodium channel genes.

== History ==
Pyrethroids were introduced by a team of Rothamsted Research scientists in the 1960s and 1970s following the elucidation of the structures of pyrethrin I and II by Hermann Staudinger and Leopold Ružička in the 1920s. The pyrethroids represented a major advancement in the chemistry that would synthesize the analog of the natural version found in pyrethrum. Its insecticidal activity has relatively low mammalian toxicity and an unusually fast biodegradation. Their development coincided with the identification of problems with DDT use. Their work consisted firstly of identifying the most active components of pyrethrum, extracted from East African chrysanthemum flowers and long known to have insecticidal properties. Pyrethrum rapidly knocks down flying insects but has negligible persistence — which is good for the environment but gives poor efficacy when applied in the field. Pyrethroids are essentially chemically stabilized forms of natural pyrethrum and belong to IRAC MoA group 3 (they interfere with sodium transport in insect nerve cells).

The first-generation pyrethroids, developed in the 1960s, include bioallethrin, tetramethrin, resmethrin, and bioresmethrin. They are more active than the natural pyrethrum but are unstable in sunlight. With the 91/414/EEC review, many 1st-generation compounds have not been included on Annex 1, probably because the market is not big enough to warrant the costs of re-registration (rather than any special concerns about safety).

By 1974, the Rothamsted team had discovered a second generation of more persistent compounds notably: permethrin, cypermethrin and deltamethrin. They are substantially more resistant to degradation by light and air, thus making them suitable for use in agriculture, but they have significantly higher mammalian toxicities. Over the subsequent decades these derivatives were followed with other proprietary compounds such as fenvalerate, lambda-cyhalothrin and beta-cyfluthrin. Most patents have now expired, making these compounds cheap and therefore popular (although permethrin and fenvalerate have not been re-registered under the 91/414/EEC process).
