= Cypermethrin =

Chemical compound

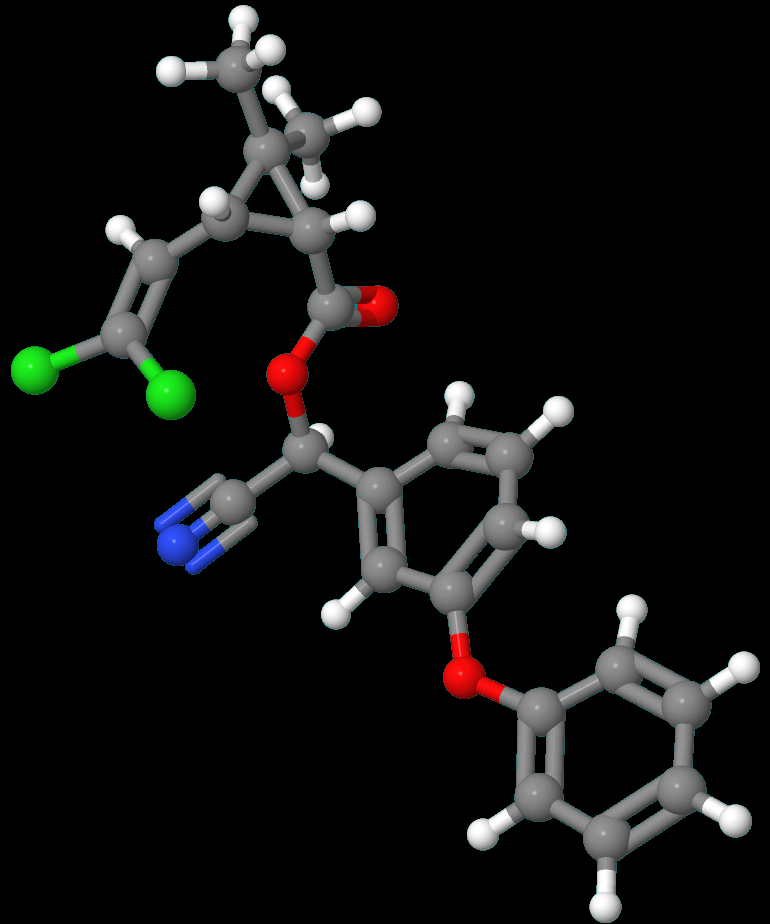

Names
- IUPAC name [Cyano-(3-phenoxyphenyl)methyl]3-(2,2-dichloroethenyl)-2,2-dimethylcyclopropane-1-carboxylate

Identifiers
CAS Number	52315-07-8
3D model (JSmol)	Interactive image
ChEBI	CHEBI:4042
ChEMBL	ChEMBL373204
ChemSpider	2809
ECHA InfoCard	100.052.567
KEGG	D07763
MeSH	Cypermethrin
PubChem CID	2912
UNII	1TR49121NP
CompTox Dashboard (EPA)	DTXSID1023998
- InChI: InChI=1S/C22H19Cl2NO3/c1-22(2)17(12-19(23)24)20(22)21(26)28-18(13-25)14-7-6-10-16(11-14)27-15-8-4-3-5-9-15/h3-12,17-18,20H,1-2H3 Key: KAATUXNTWXVJKI-UHFFFAOYSA-N; InChI=1/C22H19Cl2NO3/c1-22(2)17(12-19(23)24)20(22)21(26)28-18(13-25)14-7-6-10-16(11-14)27-15-8-4-3-5-9-15/h3-12,17-18,20H,1-2H3 Key: KAATUXNTWXVJKI-UHFFFAOYAW
- SMILES: Cl/C(Cl)=C/C3C(C(=O)OC(C#N)c2cccc(Oc1ccccc1)c2)C3(C)C

Properties
Chemical formula	C_{22}H_{19}Cl_{2}NO_{3}
Molar mass	416.30 g·mol^{−1}

Pharmacology
ATC code	P03BA02 (WHO) QP53AC08 (WHO)

Hazards
- GHS labelling
Pictograms	(GHS07: Exclamation mark) (GHS08: Health hazard) (GHS09: Environmental hazard)
Signal word	Warning
Hazard statements	H302, H332, H335, H373, H410
Precautionary statements	P260, P264, P270, P271, P273, P301+P317, P304+P340, P317, P319, P330, P391, P403+P233, P405, P501
- Except where otherwise noted, data are given for materials in their standard state (at 25 °C [77 °F], 100 kPa). verify (what is ?) Infobox references

Cypermethrin (CP) is a synthetic pyrethroid used as an insecticide in large-scale commercial agricultural applications as well as in consumer products for domestic purposes. It behaves as a fast-acting neurotoxin in insects. It is easily degraded on soil and plants but can be effective for weeks when applied to indoor inert surfaces. It is a non-systemic and non-volatile insecticide that acts by contact and ingestion, used in agriculture and in pest control products. Exposure to sunlight, water and oxygen will accelerate its decomposition. Cypermethrin is highly toxic to fish, bees and aquatic insects, according to the National Pesticide Information Center (NPIC) (previously National Pesticides Telecommunication Network) in the USA. It is found in many household ant and cockroach killers, including Raid, Ortho, Combat, ant chalk, and some variants of Baygon in Southeast Asia.

== Uses ==
Cypermethrin is used in agriculture to control ectoparasites which infest cattle, sheep, and poultry.

== Human exposure ==
Cypermethrin is moderately toxic through skin contact or ingestion. It may cause irritation to the skin and eyes. Symptoms of dermal exposure include numbness, tingling, itching, burning sensation, loss of bladder control, incoordination, seizures and possible death. Excessive exposure can cause nausea, headache, muscle weakness, salivation, shortness of breath and seizures.

Pyrethroids may adversely affect the central nervous system. Human volunteers given dermal doses of 130 μg/cm^{2} on the earlobe experienced local tingling and burning sensations. One man died after eating a meal cooked in a 10% cypermethrin/oil mix that was mistakenly used for cooking oil. Shortly after the meal, the victim experienced nausea, prolonged vomiting, stomach pains, and diarrhea which progressed to convulsions, unconsciousness and coma. Other family members exhibited milder symptoms and survived after hospital treatment.

It may cause allergic skin reactions in humans.

In humans, cypermethrin is deactivated by enzymatic hydrolysis to several carboxylic acid metabolites, which are eliminated in the urine. Worker exposure to the chemical can be monitored by measurement of the urinary metabolites, while severe overdosage may be confirmed by quantitation of cypermethrin in blood or plasma.

== Study in animals ==
Cypermethrin is very toxic to cats which cannot tolerate the therapeutic doses for dogs. This is associated with UGT1A6 deficiency in cats, the enzyme responsible for metabolizing cypermethrin. As a consequence, cypermethrin remains much longer in the cat's organs than in dogs or other mammals and can be fatal in large doses.

In male rats cypermethrin has been shown to exhibit a toxic effect on the reproductive system by Elbetieha et al. 2001. In another result, after 15 days of continual dosing, both androgen receptor levels and serum testosterone levels were significantly reduced. These data suggested that cypermethrin can induce impairments of the structure of seminiferous tubules and spermatogenesis in male rats at high doses.

Long-term exposure to cypermethrin during adulthood is found to induce dopaminergic neurodegeneration in rats, and postnatal exposure enhances the susceptibility of animals to dopaminergic neurodegeneration if rechallenged during adulthood.

If exposed to cypermethrin during pregnancy, rats give birth to offspring with developmental delays. In male rats exposed to cypermethrin, the proportion of abnormal sperm increases. It causes genetic damage: chromosomal abnormalities increased in bone marrow and spleen cells when mice were exposed to cypermethrin. Cypermethrin is classified as a possible human carcinogen, because it causes an increase in the frequency of lung tumors in female mice. Cypermethrin has been linked to an increase in bone marrow micronuclei in both mice and humans.

One study showed that cypermethrin inhibits “gap junctional intercellular communication”, which plays an important role in cell growth and is inhibited by carcinogenic agents. Studies have shown that residue from cypermethrin can last for 84 days in the air, on walls, the floor and on furniture.

== Environmental effects ==
Cypermethrin is a broad-spectrum insecticide, which means it kills beneficial insects as well as the targeted insects. Fish are particularly susceptible to cypermethrin, but when used as directed, application around residential sites poses little risk to aquatic life. Resistance to cypermethrin has developed quickly in insects exposed frequently and can render it ineffective.
