= Esfenvalerate =

Names
- Preferred IUPAC name (S)-Cyano(3-phenoxyphenyl)methyl (2S)-2-(4-chlorophenyl)-3-methylbutanoate
- Other names Asana (S)-Fenvalerate (S)-cyano-(3-phenoxy phenyl)-methyl-(S)-4-chloro-α-(1-methyl ethyl) benzene acetate Chloro-α-(1-methylethyl)benzeneacetic acid cyano(3-phenoxyphenyl)methyl ester (CAS) (S-(R,R))-4-chloro-α-(1-methylethyl) benzeneacetic acid cyano-(3-phenoxyphenyl)methylester (S)-α-cyano-3-phenoxy benzyl (S)-2-(4-chloro-phenyl) isovalerate Fenvalerate A-Alpha (S-(R*,R*))-Benzeneacetic acid, 4-chloro-α-(1-methylethyl)-cyano(3-phenoxyphenyl)methylester Cyano-3-phenoxybenzyl (S)-2-(4-chlorophenyl)isovalerate Cyano-3-phenoxybenzyl (S)-2-(4-chlorophenyl)-3-methylbutyrate

Identifiers
CAS Number	66230-04-4
3D model (JSmol)	Interactive image
Beilstein Reference	4275674
ChEBI	CHEBI:39346
ChEMBL	ChEMBL1891190
ChemSpider	8517510
ECHA InfoCard	100.118.804
EC Number	613-911-9
KEGG	C18147
PubChem CID	10342051
UNII	7F07OXM0PP
UN number	3349
CompTox Dashboard (EPA)	DTXSID4032667
- InChI: InChI=1S/C25H22ClNO3/c1-17(2)24(18-11-13-20(26)14-12-18)25(28)30-23(16-27)19-7-6-10-22(15-19)29-21-8-4-3-5-9-21/h3-15,17,23-24H,1-2H3/t23-,24+/m0/s1 Key: NYPJDWWKZLNGGM-BJKOFHAPSA-N
- SMILES: CC(C)[C@@H](C(=O)O[C@@H](C#N)c1cccc(Oc2ccccc2)c1)c1ccc(Cl)cc1

Properties
Chemical formula	C_{25}H_{22}ClNO_{3}
Molar mass	419.91 g·mol^{−1}
Density	1.211 g/cm^{3}
Melting point	60 °C (140 °F; 333 K)
log P	6.22
Vapor pressure	0 mmHg at 25 °C

Hazards
- GHS labelling
Pictograms	(GHS06: Toxic) (GHS07: Exclamation mark) (GHS08: Health hazard) (GHS09: Environmental hazard)
Signal word	Danger
Hazard statements	H301, H313, H316, H317, H320, H330, H335, H370, H373, H410
Precautionary statements	P260, P264, P270, P271, P272, P273, P280, P284, P301+P310, P302+P352, P304+P340, P305+P351+P338, P307+P311, P310, P312, P314, P320, P321, P330, P332+P313, P333+P313, P337+P313, P363, P391, P403+P233, P405, P501
Flash point	256 °C (493 °F; 529 K)
- Except where otherwise noted, data are given for materials in their standard state (at 25 °C [77 °F], 100 kPa). Infobox references

Esfenvalerate is a synthetic pyrethroid insecticide marketed under the brand Asana. It is the (S)-enantiomer of fenvalerate.

In the United States, a limit of .05 ppm of the chemical's residue is permissible in food.
