= List of insecticides =

This is a list of insecticides. These are chemical compounds which have been registered as insecticides. Biological insecticides are not included. The names on the list are the ISO common names. A complete list of pesticide common names is published by the BCPC. The University of Hertfordshire maintains a database of the chemical and biological properties of these materials, including their brand names and the countries and dates where and when they have been introduced. The industry-sponsored Insecticide Resistance Action Committee (IRAC) advises on the use of insecticides in crop protection and classifies the available compounds according to their chemical classes and mechanism of action so as to manage the risks of pesticide resistance developing. The 2024 IRAC poster of insecticide modes of action includes the majority of chemicals listed below. The pesticide manual provides much information on pesticides. The British Crop Production Council also publishes information on ISO common names of new insecticides.

Many of the insecticides in the list are not in use. The developer of a pesticide applies for a common name when they intend to sell it, but some nevertheless do not reach the market. Many insecticides have been banned or otherwise withdrawn from the market over the decades.

== Brand names and common names ==
Pesticides are sold under their brand names. The purchased pesticide is a mixture (formulation) of the active ingredient, which is the pesticide itself, and inert ingredients, such as emulsifiers, or surfactants. Only the common names of the active ingredients are shown in this list. These are approved by ISO committee (TC81). Common names are used by the authorities, in scientific literature and on the labelling information of purchasable pesticides.

== 0-9 ==
- 1,2-dichloropropane
- 2-chlorophenyl methylcarbamate

== A ==
- abamectin
- acephate
- acetamiprid
- acethion
- acetophos
- acetoprole
- acrinathrin
- acrylonitrile
- a-ecdysone
- afidopyropen
- afoxolaner
- alanycarb
- aldicarb
- aldoxycarb
- aldrin
- allethrin
- allicin
- allosamidin
- allyl isothiocyanate
- allyxycarb
- alpha-cypermethrin
- alpha-endosulfan
- amidithion
- aminocarb
- amiton
- amitraz
- anabasine
- athidathion
- azadirachtin
- azamethiphos
- azinphos-ethyl
- azinphos-methyl
- azothoate

== B ==
- barium hexafluorosilicate
- barthrin
- bendiocarb
- benfuracarb
- bensultap
- benzpyrimoxan
- beta-cyfluthrin
- beta-cypermethrin
- bifenthrin
- bioallethrin
- bioethanomethrin
- biopermethrin
- bioresmethrin
- bistrifluron
- borax
- boric acid
- brofenvalerate
- broflanilide
- brofluthrinate
- bromethrin
- bromfenvinfos
- bromocyclen
- bromo-DDT
- bromophos
- bufencarb
- buprofezin
- butacarb
- butathiofos
- butethrin
- butocarboxim
- butonate
- butoxycarboxim

== C ==
- cadusafos
- calcium arsenate
- calcium cyanide
- calcium polysulfide
- calvinphos
- camphechlor
- carbanolate
- carbaryl
- carbofuran
- carbon disulfide
- carbon tetrachloride
- carbonyl sulfide
- carbophenothion
- carbosulfan
- cartap
- carvacrol
- cevadine
- chloramine phosphorus
- chlorantraniliprole
- chlorbenzuron
- chlorbicyclen
- chlordane
- chlordecone
- chlordimeform
- chlorempenthrin
- chlorethoxyfos
- chlorfenapyr
- chlorfenvinphos
- chlorfluazuron
- chlormephos
- chloroform
- chloropicrin
- chloroprallethrin
- chlorphoxim
- chlorprazophos
- chlorpyrifos
- chlorpyrifos-methyl
- chlorthiophos
- chromafenozide
- cinerins
- cismethrin
- cloethocarb
- closantel
- clothianidin
- colophonate
- copper arsenate
- copper naphthenate
- copper oleate
- coumaphos
- coumithoate
- CPMC
- crotamiton
- crotoxyphos
- crufomate
- cryolite
- cyanofenphos
- cyanogen
- cyanophos
- cyanthoate
- cyantraniliprole
- cybenzoxasulfyl
- cyclaniliprole
- cyclethrin
- cycloprothrin
- cycloxaprid
- cyfluthrin
- cyhalodiamide
- cyhalothrin
- cypermethrin
- cyphenothrin
- cyproflanilide
- cyromazine
- cythioate

== D ==
- dayoutong
- DDT
- decarbofuran
- deltamethrin
- demephion
- demeton
- d-fanshiluquebingjuzhi
- DFDT
- diafenthiuron
- dialifos
- diatomaceous earth
- diazinon
- dicapthon
- dichlofenthion
- dichlorbenzuron
- dichlorvos
- dicloromezotiaz
- dicresyl
- dicrotophos
- dicyclanil
- dieldrin
- diflubenzuron
- dimefluthrin
- dimefox
- dimetan
- dimethacarb
- dimethoate
- dimethrin
- dimethyl disulfide
- dimethylvinphos
- dimetilan
- dimpropyridaz
- dinex
- dinoprop
- dinosam
- dinotefuran
- diofenolan
- dioxabenzofos
- dioxacarb
- dioxathion
- disulfoton
- dithicrofos
- d-limonene
- DNOC
- doramectin
- d-teflumethrin

== E ==
- ecdysterone
- emamectin
- EMPC
- empenthrin
- endosulfan
- endothion
- endrin
- EPN
- epofenonane
- eprinomectin
- epsilon-metofluthrin
- epsilon-momfluorothrin
- esafoxolaner
- esdépalléthrine
- esfenvalerate
- etaphos
- ethiofencarb
- ethion
- ethiprole
- ethoate-methyl
- ethoprophos
- ethyl formate
- ethyl-DDD
- ethylene dibromide
- ethylene dichloride
- ethylene oxide
- etofenprox
- etrimfos
- EXD

== F ==
- famphur
- fenamiphos
- fenazaflor
- fenchlorphos
- fenethacarb
- fenfluthrin
- fenitrothion
- fenmezoditiaz
- fenobucarb
- fenoxacrim
- fenoxycarb
- fenpirithrin
- fenpropathrin
- fensulfothion
- fenthion
- fentrifanil
- fenvalerate
- fipronil
- flometoquin
- flonicamid
- flubendiamide
- fluchlordiniliprole
- flucofuron
- flucycloxuron
- flucythrinate
- flufenerim
- flufenoxuron
- flufenprox
- flufiprole
- fluhexafon
- flumetnicam
- flupymezotiaz
- flupyradifurone
- flupyrazofos
- flupyrimin
- flupyroxystrobin
- fluralaner
- flursulamid
- fluvalinate
- fluxametamide
- fonofos
- formetanate
- formothion
- formparanate
- fosmethilan
- fospirate
- fosthietan
- furamethrin
- furan tebufenozide
- furathiocarb
- furethrin

== G ==
- gamma-cyhalothrin
- gamma-HCH

== H ==
- halfenprox
- halofenozide
- HCH
- HEOD
- heptachlor
- heptafluthrin
- heptenophos
- heterophos
- hexaflumuron
- HHDN
- hydramethylnon
- hydrogen cyanide
- hydroprene
- hyquincarb

== I ==
- imidacloprid
- imidaclothiz
- imiprothrin
- indazapyroxamet
- indoxacarb
- IPSP
- isazofos
- isobenzan
- isocarbophos
- isocycloseram
- isodrin
- isofenphos
- isoflualanam
- isolan
- isoprocarb
- isoprothiolane
- isothioate
- isoxathion
- ivermectin

== J ==
- japothrins
- jasmolins
- jiahuangchongzong
- jodfenphos
- juvenile hormones

== K ==
- kadethrin
- kappa-bifenthrin
- kappa-tefluthrin
- kelevan
- kinoprene

== L ==
- lambda-cyhalothrin
- lead arsenate
- ledprona
- lepimectin
- leptophos
- lindane
- lirimfos
- lotilaner
- lufenuron
- lythidathion

== M ==
- malathion
- malonoben
- maltodextrin
- matrine
- mazidox
- mecarbam
- mecarphon
- medimeform
- menazon
- meperfluthrin
- mephosfolan
- mercurous chloride
- mesulfenfos
- metaflumizone
- methacrifos
- methamidophos
- methidathion
- methiocarb
- methocrotophos
- methomyl
- methoprene
- methothrin
- methoxychlor
- methoxyfenozide
- methyl bromide
- methyl iodide
- methyl isothiocyanate
- methylacetophos
- methylchloroform
- methylene chloride
- metofluthrin
- metolcarb
- metoxadiazone
- mevinphos
- mexacarbate
- mipafox
- mirex
- mivorilaner
- modoflaner
- momfluorothrin
- monocrotophos
- morphothion
- moxidectin

== N ==
- naftalofos
- naled
- naphthalene
- nicofluprole
- nicotine
- nifluridide
- nitenpyram
- nithiazine
- nitrilacarb
- nornicotine
- novaluron
- noviflumuron

== O ==
- omethoate
- oxamyl
- oxazosulfyl
- oxydemeton-methyl
- oxydeprofos
- oxydisulfoton
- oxymatrine

== P ==
- paichongding
- parathion
- parathion-methyl
- Paris green
- p-dichlorobenzene
- penfluron
- pentachlorophenol
- pentmethrin
- permethrin
- phenkapton
- phenothrin
- phenthoate
- phorate
- phosalone
- phosfolan
- phosglycin
- phosmet
- phosnichlor
- phosphamidon
- phosphine
- phoxim
- pioxaniliprole
- piperflanilide
- pirimetaphos
- pirimicarb
- pirimioxyphos
- pirimiphos-ethyl
- pirimiphos-methyl
- plifenate
- polythialan
- potassium arsenite
- potassium thiocyanate
- prallethrin
- precocenes
- primidophos
- profenofos
- profluthrin
- promacyl
- promecarb
- propaphos
- proparthrin
- propetamphos
- propoxur
- prothidathion
- prothiofos
- prothoate
- protrifenbute
- pymetrozine
- pyraclofos
- pyrafluprole
- pyramat
- pyrazophos
- pyrazothion
- pyresmethrin
- pyrethrin I
- pyrethrin II
- pyrethrins
- pyrethroid
- pyridaben
- pyridalyl
- pyridaphenthion
- pyrifluquinazon
- pyrimidifen
- pyrimitate
- pyriprole
- pyriproxyfen
- pyrolan

== Q ==
- quassia
- quinalphos
- quinothion

== R ==
- rafoxanide
- renofluthrin
- resmethrin
- rhodojaponin-III
- rotenone
- ryania
- ryanodine

== S ==
- sabadilla
- sanguinarine
- sarolaner
- schradan
- selamectin
- semiamitraz
- silafluofen
- silica gel
- sodium arsenite
- sodium cyanide
- sodium fluoride
- sodium silicofluoride
- sodium tetrathiocarbonate
- sodium thiocyanate
- sophamide
- spidoxamat
- spinetoram
- spinosad
- spirodiclofen
- spiromesifen
- spiropidion
- spirotetramat
- sulcofuron
- sulfiflumin
- sulfindoflufen
- sulfluramid
- sulfotep
- sulfoxaflor
- sulfoxime
- sulfuryl fluoride
- sulprofos
- supermethrin

== T ==
- tartar emetic
- tau-fluvalinate
- tazimcarb
- TDE
- tebufenozide
- tebupirimfos
- teflubenzuron
- tefluthrin
- temephos
- TEPP
- terallethrin
- terbufos
- tetrachlorantraniliprole
- tetrachloroethane
- tetrachlorvinphos
- tetramethrin
- tetramethylfluthrin
- tetraniliprole
- theta-cypermethrin
- thiacloprid
- thiamethoxam
- thiapronil
- thicrofos
- thiocarboxime
- thiocyclam
- thiodicarb
- thiofanox
- thiofluoximate
- thiometon
- thiosultap
- thuringiensin
- tiapyrachlor
- tigolaner
- tiorantraniliprole
- tolfenpyrad
- tralocythrin
- tralomethrin
- transfluthrin
- transpermethrin
- triamiphos
- triarathene
- triazamate
- triazophos
- trichlophenidine
- trichlorfon
- trichlormetaphos-3
- trichloronate
- trifenofos
- triflumezopyrim
- triflumuron
- trimethacarb
- trioxyflanilide
- triprene
- triptolide
- tyclopyrazoflor

== U ==
- umifoxolaner

== V ==
- valerate
- vaniliprole
- veratridine
- vinylfluthrin

== X ==
- xiaochongliulin
- XMC
- xylylcarb

== Y ==
- yishijing

== Z ==
- zeta-cypermethrin
- zolaprofos

== See also ==
- Biopesticide
- Federal Insecticide, Fungicide, and Rodenticide Act
- List of fungicides
- List of herbicides
