= C12H15N2O3PS =

The molecular formula C_{12}H_{15}N_{2}O_{3}PS (molar mass: 298.30 g/mol, exact mass: 298.0541 u) may refer to:

- Phoxim
- Quinalphos
