= Polyp (zoology) =

One of two forms found in the phylum Cnidaria (zoology)

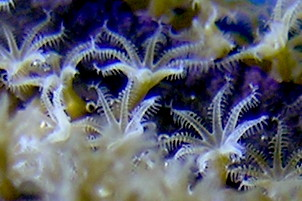
Gorgonian polyps in a reef aquarium

A polyp in zoology is one of two forms found in the phylum Cnidaria, the other being the medusa. Polyps are roughly cylindrical in shape and elongated at the axis of the vase-shaped body. In solitary polyps, the aboral (opposite to oral) end is attached to the substrate by means of a disc-like holdfast called a pedal disc, while in colonies of polyps it is connected to other polyps, either directly or indirectly. The oral end contains the mouth, and is surrounded by a circlet of tentacles.

== Classes ==
In the class Anthozoa, comprising the sea anemones and corals, the individual is always a polyp; in the class Hydrozoa, however, the individual may be either a polyp or a medusa, with most species undergoing a life cycle with both a polyp stage and a medusa stage.

In the class Scyphozoa, the medusa stage is dominant, and the polyp stage may or may not be present, depending on the family. In those scyphozoans that have the larval planula metamorphose into a polyp, the polyp, also called a "scyphistoma," grows until it develops a stack of plate-like medusae that pinch off and swim away in a process known as strobilation. Once strobilation is complete, the polyp may die, or regenerate itself to repeat the process again later. With cubozoans, the planula settles onto a suitable surface, and develops into a polyp. The cubozoan polyp then eventually metamorphoses directly into a medusa.

== Anatomy ==
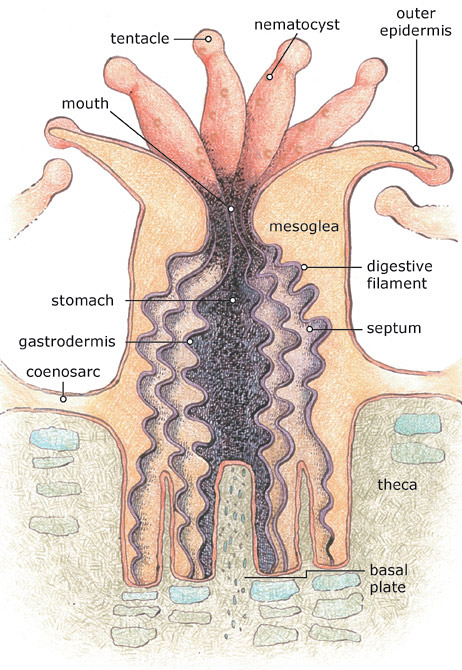
Anatomy of a coral polyp

The body of the polyp may be roughly compared in a structure to a sac, the wall of which is composed of two layers of cells. The outer layer is known technically as the ectoderm, with the inner layer as the endoderm (or gastroderm). Between ectoderm and endoderm is a supporting layer of structureless gelatinous substance termed mesoglea, secreted by the cell layers of the body wall. The mesoglea can be thinner than the endoderm or ectoderm or comprise the bulk of the body as in larger jellyfish. The mesoglea can contain skeletal elements derived from cells migrated from ectoderm.

The sac-like body built up in this way is attached usually to some firm object by its blind end, and bears at the upper end the mouth which is surrounded by a circle of tentacles which resemble glove fingers. The tentacles are organs which serve both for the tactile sense and for the capture of food. Polyps extend their tentacles, particularly at night, containing coiled stinging nettle-like cells, or nematocysts, which pierce, poison, and firmly hold living prey paralysing or killing them. Polyp prey includes copepods and fish larvae. Longitudinal muscular fibrils formed from the cells of the ectoderm allow tentacles to contract when conveying the food to the mouth. Similarly, circularly disposed muscular fibrils formed from the endoderm permit tentacles to be protract or thrust out once they are contracted. These muscle fibres belong to the same two systems, allowing the whole body to retract or protrude outwards.

We can distinguish therefore in the body of a polyp the column, circular or oval in section, forming the trunk, resting on a base or foot and surmounted by the crown of tentacles, which enclose an area termed the peristome, in the centre of which again is the mouth. Generally, there is no other opening to the body except the mouth, but in some cases excretory pores are known to occur in the foot, and pores may occur at the tips of the tentacles. A polyp is an animal of very simple structure, a living fossil that has not changed significantly for about half a billion years (per generally accepted dating of Cambrian sedimentary rock).

The external form of the polyp varies greatly in different cases. The column may be long and slender, or may be so short in the vertical direction that the body becomes disk-like. The tentacles may number many hundreds or may be very few, in rare cases only one or two. They may be long and filamentous, or short and reduced to mere knobs or warts. They may be simple and unbranched, or they may be feathery in pattern. The mouth may be level with the surface of the peristome, or may be projecting and trumpet-shaped. As regards internal structure, polyps exhibit two well-marked types of organization, each characteristic of one of the two classes, Hydrozoa and Anthozoa.

In the class Hydrozoa, the polyps are indeed often very simple, like the common little fresh water species of the genus Hydra. Anthozoan polyps, including the corals and sea anemones, are much more complex due to the development of a tubular stomodaeum leading inward from the mouth and a series of radial partitions called mesenteries. Many of the mesenteries project into the enteric cavity but some extend from the body wall to the central stomodaeum.

== Reproduction ==
It is an almost universal attribute of polyps to reproduce asexually by the method of budding. This mode of reproduction may be combined with sexual reproduction, or may be the sole method by which the polyp produces offspring, in which case the polyp is entirely without sexual organs.

=== Asexual reproduction ===
In many cases the buds formed do not separate from the parent but remain in continuity with it, thus forming colonies or stocks, which may reach a great size and contain a vast number of individuals. Slight differences in the method of budding produce great variations in the form of the colonies. The reef-building corals are polyp-colonies, strengthened by the formation of a firm skeleton.

=== Sexual reproduction ===
Among sea anemones, sexual plasticity may occur. That is, asexually produced clones derived from a single founder individual can contain both male and female individuals (ramets). When eggs and sperm (gametes) are formed, they can produce zygotes derived from "selfing" (within the founding clone) or out-crossing, that then develop into swimming planula larvae.

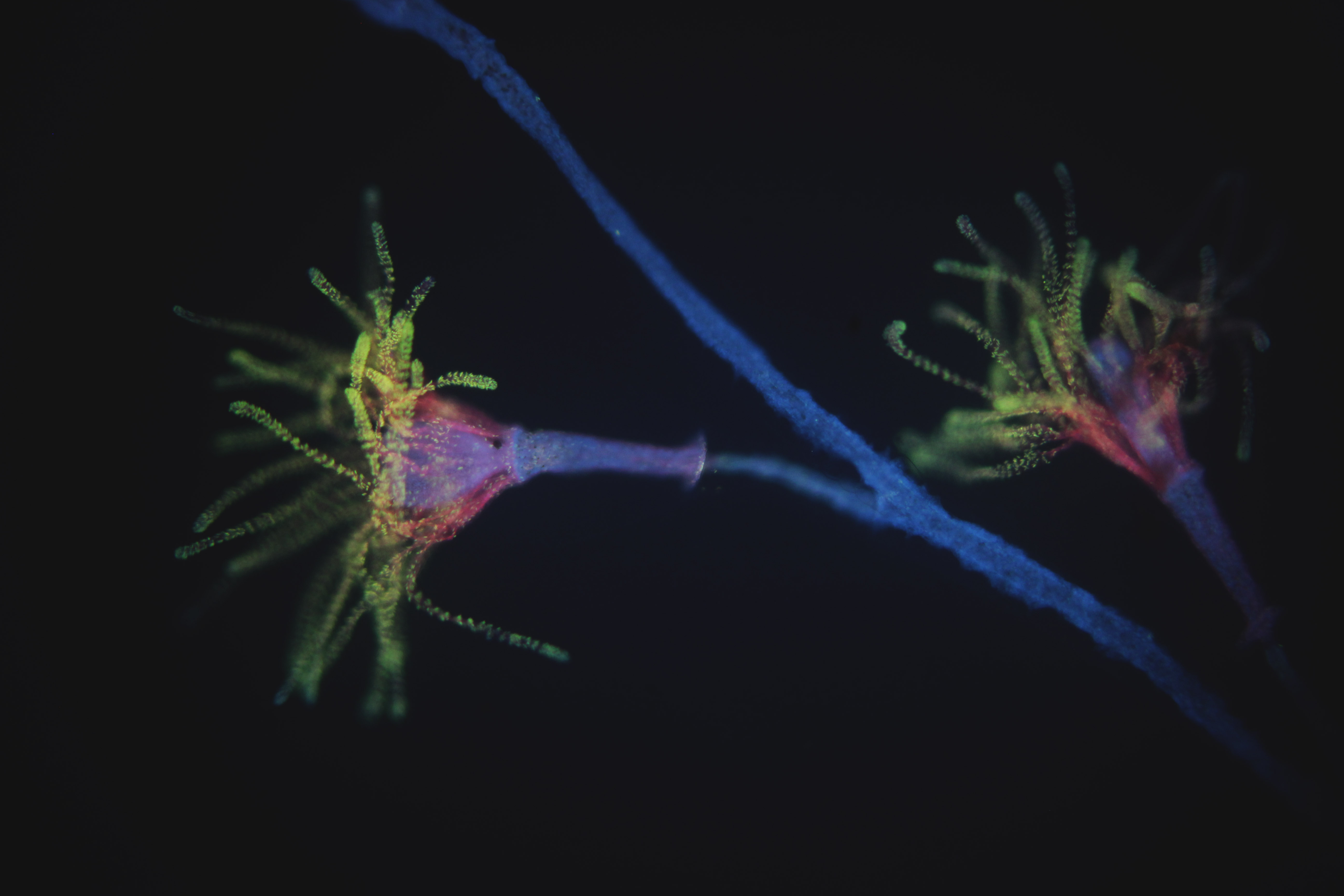
Polyps of a colony of Cnidaria

The overwhelming majority of stony coral (Scleractinia) taxa are hermaphroditic in their adult colonies. In these species, there is ordinarily synchronized release of eggs and sperm into the water during brief spawning events. Although some species are capable of self-fertilization to varying extents, cross-fertilization appears to be the dominant mating pattern.

== Etymology ==
The name polyp was given by René Antoine Ferchault de Réaumur to these organisms from their superficial resemblance to an octopus (French: poulpe, ultimately from Ancient Greek adverb πολύ (poly, "much") + noun πούς (pous, "foot")), with its circle of writhing arms round the mouth. This comparison contrasts to the common name "coral-insects", applied to the polyps which form coral.

== Threats ==
75% of the world's corals are threatened due to overfishing, destructive fishing, coastal development, pollution, thermal stress, ocean acidification, crown-of-thorns starfish, and introduced invasive species.

In recent decades the conditions that corals and polyps have found themselves in have been changing, leading to new diseases being observed in corals in many parts of the world, posing even greater risk to an already pressured animal. Aquatic life has been put under a substantial amount of stress because of the pollutants caused by land-based agriculture. Particularly, exposure to the insecticide profenofos and the fungicide MEMC have played a major part in polyp retraction and biomass decrease.

There have been many experiments supporting the hypothesis that heat stress in Acropora tenuis juvenile polyps provokes an up-regulation of protein in the endoplasmic reticulum. The results vary based on the polyp characteristics such as age, type, and growth stage.

== See also ==
- Portuguese man o' war
- Zoanthid
