= C10H16N4O3 =

The molecular formula C_{10}H_{16}N_{4}O_{3} (molar mass: 240.26 g/mol, exact mass: 240.1222 u) may refer to:

- Anserine (β-alanyl-3-methylhistidine)
- Dimetilan
