= Chlorphoxim =

Names
- IUPAC name (1Z)-2-chloro-N-diethoxyphosphinothioyloxybenzenecarboximidoyl cyanide

Identifiers
| CAS Number | 14816-20-7 |
| 3D model (JSmol) | Interactive image |
| ChEBI | CHEBI:82108 |
| ChEMBL | ChEMBL1354530 |
| ChemSpider | 7844758 |
| ECHA InfoCard | 100.035.338 |
| EC Number | 238-888-9 |
| KEGG | C18969 |
| PubChem CID | 9570291 |
| UNII | W1T1BS3R7V |
| CompTox Dashboard (EPA) | DTXSID9057979 |
- InChI: InChI=1S/C12H14ClN2O3PS/c1-3-16-19(20,17-4-2)18-15-12(9-14)10-7-5-6-8-11(10)13/h5-8H,3-4H2,1-2H3/b15-12+; Key: GQKRUMZWUHSLJF-NTCAYCPXSA-N
- SMILES: CCOP(=S)(OCC)O/N=C(\C#N)/C1=CC=CC=C1Cl

Properties
| Chemical formula | C_{12}H_{14}ClN_{2}O_{3}PS |
| Molar mass | 332.74 g·mol^{−1} |
- Except where otherwise noted, data are given for materials in their standard state (at 25 °C [77 °F], 100 kPa). Infobox references

Chlorphoxime is an insecticide used as crop protection active ingredient. Chlorphoxime is also a cholinesterase inhibitor and a neurotoxin.

== Properties ==
A study was conducted to investigate the effect of chlorophoxime for the control of fleas in kangaroo rats and hispid cotton rats. Chlorphoxime was found to be effective.

In another study, the efficacy of some insecticides was investigated on certain storage pests. While phoxim, bioresmethrin and fenitrothion showed strong activity against the red-brown rice mealybug, the insecticidal activity of chlorphoxim and permethrin was low.

== Production ==
The synthesis of chlorophoxime is described in the following reaction sequence:

Chlorphoxim synthesis

== Trade names ==
A crop protection product containing the active ingredient chlorophoxime is marketed under the trade name Baythion.

== Approval ==
No plant protection products containing chlorophoxime are approved in the European Union or Switzerland.
