= Profenofos =

Names
- Preferred IUPAC name O-(4-Bromo-2-chlorophenyl) O-ethyl S-propyl phosphorothioate
- Other names Phosphorothioic acid, O-(4-bromo-2-chlorophenyl)O-ethylS-propyl ester

Identifiers
CAS Number	41198-08-7
3D model (JSmol)	Interactive image
ChemSpider	35529
ECHA InfoCard	100.050.215
PubChem CID	38779
UNII	7J04O7BS4W
CompTox Dashboard (EPA)	DTXSID3032464
- InChI: InChI=1S/C11H15BrClO3PS/c1-3-7-18-17(14,15-4-2)16-11-6-5-9(12)8-10(11)13/h5-6,8H,3-4,7H2,1-2H3 Key: QYMMJNLHFKGANY-UHFFFAOYSA-N
- SMILES: CCCSP(=O)(OCC)OC1=C(C=C(C=C1)Br)Cl

Properties
Chemical formula	C_{11}H_{15}BrClO_{3}PS
Molar mass	373.63 g·mol^{−1}
Appearance	Pale yellow to amber liquid
- Except where otherwise noted, data are given for materials in their standard state (at 25 °C [77 °F], 100 kPa). Infobox references

Profenofos is an organophosphate insecticide. It is a liquid with a pale yellow to amber color and a garlic-like odor. It was first registered in the United States in 1982. As of 2015, it was not approved in the European Union.

== Uses ==
Profenofos can be used on a variety of crops including cotton and vegetables such as maize, potato, soybean, and sugar beet. In the United States it is used exclusively on cotton and is primarily used against lepidopteran insects.

Mixed with phoxim, cypermethrin, beta-cypermethrin imidacloprid and deltamethrin, profenofos can be used against Cotton MealyBug, cabbage caterpillar, Plutella xylostella and asparagus caterpillars, as well as against wheat and cabbage aphids.

== Mechanism of action ==
Like other organophosphates, the profenofos mechanism of action is via the inhibition of the acetylcholinesterase enzyme. Although it is used in the form of a racemate, the S(-) isomer is a more potent inhibitor.

== Synthesis ==
One route to chemical synthesis of profenofos.

Profenofos can be synthesized by reacting phosphorus oxychloride with sodium ethoxide and sodium 1-propanethiolate, followed by treatment with 4-bromo-2-chlorophenol.

== Toxicity ==
A 2007 World Health Organization report found no adverse effects to workers of routine exposure to profenofos and no teratogenicity or carcinogenicity.

Based on a study of patients poisoned with profenofos and its close chemical relative prothiofos, the compound has been described as "of moderately severe toxicity", causing respiratory failure. Differences in chemical structure that distinguish these two compounds from more common organophosphate pesticides - namely, the presence of the S-alkyl group on the phosphorus atom where most OP compounds possess a methoxy or ethoxy group - underlie differences in their behavior as acetylcholinesterase enzyme inhibitors compared to the rest of the OP class.

In one study of a patient who died of profenofos poisoning, the major metabolites of profenofos were identified as des-S-propylated profenofos, two isomers of despropylated propenofos, and desethylated propenofos. A downstream, nontoxic metabolite, 4-bromo-2-chlorophenol, has been proposed as biomarker for exposure.

== Environmental effects ==
A United States Environmental Protection Agency report identified profenofos as toxic to birds, small mammals, bees, fish, and aquatic invertebrates, noting several fish kill incidents in which profenofos exposure, primarily due to runoff, was implicated as a probable cause.
