= Demephion =

- Demephion-O

- Demephion-S

Names
- IUPAC names O,O-Dimethyl O-[2-(methylsulfanyl)ethyl] phosphorothioate (demephion-O); O,O-Dimethyl S-[2-(methylsulfanyl)ethyl] phosphorothioate (demephion-S)

Identifiers
CAS Number	682-80-4 (demephion-O); 2587-90-8 (demephion-S)
3D model (JSmol)	(demephion-O): Interactive image; (demephion-S): Interactive image
ChemSpider	103017 (demephion-O); 16480 (demephion-S)
ECHA InfoCard	100.221.416
PubChem CID	115123 (demephion-O); 17423 (demephion-S)
UNII	0O09494G0U (demephion-O); 2678KW974N (demephion-S)
CompTox Dashboard (EPA)	DTXSID50274158
- InChI: InChI=1S/C5H13O3PS2/c1-6-9(10,7-2)8-4-5-11-3/h4-5H2,1-3H3 Key: IATBEFPCSHFQJS-UHFFFAOYSA-N; (demephion-S): InChI=1S/C5H13O3PS2/c1-7-9(6,8-2)11-5-4-10-3/h4-5H2,1-3H3 Key: PSTWJANBJOHFQJ-UHFFFAOYSA-N
- SMILES: (demephion-O): S=P(OC)(OCCSC)OC; (demephion-S): O=P(OC)(OC)SCCSC

Properties
Chemical formula	C_{5}H_{13}O_{3}PS_{2}
Molar mass	216.25 g·mol^{−1}
- Except where otherwise noted, data are given for materials in their standard state (at 25 °C [77 °F], 100 kPa). Infobox references

Demephion is an organothiophosphate insecticide. It is a mixture of two closely related structural isomers demephion-O and demephion-S.

Demephion-S is listed as an extremely hazardous substance according to the U.S. Emergency Planning and Community Right-to-Know Act.
