= Azamethiphos =

Names
- Preferred IUPAC name S-[(6-Chloro-2-oxo[1,3]oxazolo[4,5-b]pyridin-3(2H)-yl)methyl] O,O-dimethyl phosphorothioate
- Other names Azamethifos; Azamethiophos

Identifiers
CAS Number	35575-96-3
3D model (JSmol)	Interactive image
ChEMBL	ChEMBL1867031
ChemSpider	64559
ECHA InfoCard	100.047.827
PubChem CID	71482
UNII	9440R8149U
CompTox Dashboard (EPA)	DTXSID9034818
- InChI: InChI=1S/C9H10ClN2O5PS/c1-15-18(14,16-2)19-5-12-8-7(17-9(12)13)3-6(10)4-11-8/h3-4H,5H2,1-2H3 Key: VNKBTWQZTQIWDV-UHFFFAOYSA-N; InChI=1/C9H10ClN2O5PS/c1-15-18(14,16-2)19-5-12-8-7(17-9(12)13)3-6(10)4-11-8/h3-4H,5H2,1-2H3 Key: VNKBTWQZTQIWDV-UHFFFAOYAD
- SMILES: O=P(OC)(OC)SCN1c2ncc(Cl)cc2OC1=O

Properties
Chemical formula	C_{9}H_{10}ClN_{2}O_{5}PS
Molar mass	324.67 g·mol^{−1}

Pharmacology
ATCvet code	QP53AF17 (WHO)
Legal status	AU: S6 (Poison)
- Except where otherwise noted, data are given for materials in their standard state (at 25 °C [77 °F], 100 kPa). Infobox references

Azamethiphos is an organothiophosphate insecticide. It is a veterinary drug used in Atlantic salmon fish farming along with other fish in the Salmonid family to control parasites, specifically sea lice. It is also used as an insecticide in biocidal products in Europe.

== Mode of action ==
Organophosphorus insecticides such as azamethiphos inhibit the action of the enzyme acetylcholinesterase. The acetylcholine, therefore, remains intact allowing the electrical signal to proceed without interruption. This phenomenon leads to overexcitation of the organism and eventually to the death of the insect.

Azamethiphos penetrates through the cuticle or through the cuticle opening of the insect, and also acts by ingestion and absorption through the digestive system.

== Registration ==
In Europe, azamethiphos is an active substance, according to the Biocide Regulation 528/2012, to be used as an insecticide.

It is used in several biocidal products in Europe, such as insecticides, mainly for professional users. It is commonly used against flies in animal housing.

== Stability ==
Azamethiphos is sensitive to hydrolysis, especially at low pH.

== Toxicity ==
Azamethiphos is of moderate acute oral toxicity with LD_{50} values ranging from 834 mg/kg in the rat to 1764 mg/kg in the hamster. Acute dermal toxicity is very low; LD_{50} values of >2020 and >6000 mg/kg are reported in the rabbit and an LD_{50} of >2150 mg/kg is reported in the rat.

Azamethiphos is an irritant to the eyes and skin. It is considered toxic if inhaled and is harmful if swallowed. It is also believed to be a possible carcinogen and can cause damage to organs.

== Environmental toxicity ==
Azamethiphos is very toxic to the environment, with an LC_{50} on Daphnia magna of 0.33 μg/L. It is also considered to have a high acute oral toxicity for birds.

When azamethiphos is utilized as an insecticide in rainbow trout fish farming, it has been found that it causes changes in proteins within the fish. The proteins that have been altered are usually associated with the trout's clot formation, immune reaction, and free heme binding. Besides these changes, there has also been record of tissue damage in the fish. Other concerning results from studies show that there are changes in how the fish handle iron, with impacts such as iron accumulation in their organs and also possible chronic kidney trauma from deposits of iron in their body. In addition to its negative impacts when used in fish farming, it has a poor impact on the environment after it is applied. While it does degrade relatively quickly in water, it is still able to spread in the aquatic environment and negatively impacts other species such as lobster larvae.

== Health effects due to exposure ==
Common exposure pathways for azamethiphos are dermal and ingestion. When exposed to low dosages of azamethiphos, common symptoms experienced are excessive salivation and eye-watering. Higher dosages of azamethiphos bring more severe symptoms, like severe nausea/vomiting, sweating, bradycardia, and convulsions. Muscle weakness is another likely symptom that can be experienced and can result in death if muscle weakness reaches the respiratory muscles. Some methods to prevent exposure to azamethiphos are wearing protective equipment and washing exposed skin before touching other surfaces.

Exposure to azamethiphos can affect women differently. Continued exposure to azamethiphos can cause reproductive effects regarding fertility, menstrual cycle disruptions, spontaneous abortions, stillbirths, and impaired fetal growth and development.
