= Prothoate =

Names
- Preferred IUPAC name O,O-Diethyl S-{2-oxo-2-[(propan-2-yl)amino]ethyl} phosphorodithioate
- Other names Isopropyl diethyldithiophosphorylacetamide; 2-Diethoxyphosphinothioylthio-N-isopropylacetamide

Identifiers
CAS Number	2275-18-5
3D model (JSmol)	Interactive image
ChemSpider	15901
ECHA InfoCard	100.017.177
PubChem CID	16774
UNII	4V035A5L4B
CompTox Dashboard (EPA)	DTXSID8037627
- InChI: InChI=1S/C9H20NO3PS2/c1-5-12-14(15,13-6-2)16-7-9(11)10-8(3)4/h8H,5-7H2,1-4H3,(H,10,11) Key: QTXHFDHVLBDJIO-UHFFFAOYSA-N; InChI=1/C9H20NO3PS2/c1-5-12-14(15,13-6-2)16-7-9(11)10-8(3)4/h8H,5-7H2,1-4H3,(H,10,11) Key: QTXHFDHVLBDJIO-UHFFFAOYAO
- SMILES: O=C(NC(C)C)CSP(=S)(OCC)OCC

Properties
Chemical formula	C_{9}H_{20}NO_{3}PS_{2}
Molar mass	285.36 g·mol^{−1}
Appearance	Colorless solid
- Except where otherwise noted, data are given for materials in their standard state (at 25 °C [77 °F], 100 kPa). Infobox references

Prothoate is an organothiophosphate insecticide also used as an acaricide.

It is listed as an extremely hazardous substance according to the U.S. Emergency Planning and Community Right-to-Know Act.
