= Fonofos =

Names
- Preferred IUPAC name O-Ethyl S-phenyl ethylphosphonodithioate
- Other names Dyfonate, Dyphonate, Fonophos

Identifiers
CAS Number	944-22-9
3D model (JSmol)	Interactive image
ChemSpider	13087
ECHA InfoCard	100.012.189
PubChem CID	13676
UNII	P4VT8081QO
CompTox Dashboard (EPA)	DTXSID2024113
- InChI: InChI=1S/C10H15OPS2/c1-3-11-12(13,4-2)14-10-8-6-5-7-9-10/h5-9H,3-4H2,1-2H3 Key: KVGLBTYUCJYMND-UHFFFAOYSA-N; InChI=1/C10H15OPS2/c1-3-11-12(13,4-2)14-10-8-6-5-7-9-10/h5-9H,3-4H2,1-2H3 Key: KVGLBTYUCJYMND-UHFFFAOYAE
- SMILES: CCOP(=S)(CC)Sc1ccccc1

Properties
Chemical formula	C_{10}H_{15}OPS_{2}
Molar mass	246.32 g·mol^{−1}
Appearance	Light-yellow liquid with an aromatic odor
Density	1.16 g/cm^{3}
Boiling point	130 °C (266 °F; 403 K) 0.13 mbar
Solubility in water	0.001% (20°C)
Vapor pressure	0.0002 mmHg (25°C)

Hazards
Flash point	> 94 °C; 201 °F; 367 K
- NIOSH (US health exposure limits)
PEL (Permissible)	none
REL (Recommended)	TWA 0.1 mg/m^{3} [skin]
IDLH (Immediate danger)	N.D.
- Except where otherwise noted, data are given for materials in their standard state (at 25 °C [77 °F], 100 kPa). Infobox references

Fonofos is an organothiophosphate insecticide primarily used on corn. It is highly toxic and listed as an extremely hazardous substance.

== Physical and chemical properties ==
=== Physical properties ===
At room temperature, fonofos has a clear-to-yellow color. It has a distinct Mercaptan odour. It is soluble in most common organic Solvents. It is available in multiple forms, including granular, microgranular,
