= Oxydemeton-methyl =

Names
- Preferred IUPAC name S-[2-(Ethanesulfinyl)ethyl] O,O-dimethyl phosphorothioate
- Other names Methylmercaptophos oxide

Identifiers
CAS Number	301-12-2
3D model (JSmol)	Interactive image
ChEBI	CHEBI:38735
ChEMBL	ChEMBL1315891
ChemSpider	4457
ECHA InfoCard	100.005.556
PubChem CID	4618
UNII	E2031449YZ
CompTox Dashboard (EPA)	DTXSID8025541
- InChI: InChI=1S/C6H15O4PS2/c1-4-13(8)6-5-12-11(7,9-2)10-3/h4-6H2,1-3H3 Key: PMCVMORKVPSKHZ-UHFFFAOYSA-N; InChI=1/C6H15O4PS2/c1-4-13(8)6-5-12-11(7,9-2)10-3/h4-6H2,1-3H3 Key: PMCVMORKVPSKHZ-UHFFFAOYAE
- SMILES: O=S(CCSP(=O)(OC)OC)CC

Properties
Chemical formula	C_{6}H_{15}O_{4}PS_{2}
Molar mass	246.28 g·mol^{−1}
Density	1.289 g/cm^{3} (20 °C)
Melting point	−20 °C (−4 °F; 253 K)
Boiling point	106 °C (223 °F; 379 K)
Solubility in water	Miscible

Hazards
Flash point	113 °C (235 °F; 386 K)
- Except where otherwise noted, data are given for materials in their standard state (at 25 °C [77 °F], 100 kPa). Infobox references

Oxydemeton-methyl is an organothiophosphate insecticide. It is primarily used to control aphids, mites, and thrips.
