= Phenthoate =

Names
- IUPAC name (RS)-Ethyl [(dimethoxyphosphorothioyl)sulfanyl](phenyl)acetate
- Other names S-α-ethoxycarbonylbenzyl O,O-dimethyl phosphorodithioate; Ethyl dimethoxyphosphinothioylthio(phenyl)acetate; Ethyl α-[(dimethoxyphosphinothioyl)thio]benzeneacetate; PAP; Dimephenthioate; Dimephenthoate; Dimethenthoate

Identifiers
CAS Number	2597-03-7
3D model (JSmol)	Interactive image
ChEBI	CHEBI:34917
ChemSpider	16492
ECHA InfoCard	100.018.180
PubChem CID	17435
UNII	J96Q7F091K
CompTox Dashboard (EPA)	DTXSID6042280
- InChI: InChI=1S/C12H17O4PS2/c1-4-16-12(13)11(10-8-6-5-7-9-10)19-17(18,14-2)15-3/h5-9,11H,4H2,1-3H3 Key: XAMUDJHXFNRLCY-UHFFFAOYSA-N; InChI=1/C12H17O4PS2/c1-4-16-12(13)11(10-8-6-5-7-9-10)19-17(18,14-2)15-3/h5-9,11H,4H2,1-3H3 Key: XAMUDJHXFNRLCY-UHFFFAOYAS
- SMILES: O=C(OCC)C(SP(=S)(OC)OC)c1ccccc1

Properties
Chemical formula	C_{12}H_{17}O_{4}PS_{2}
Molar mass	320.36 g·mol^{−1}
Appearance	Colorless crystalline solid
Density	1.226 g/mL (20 °C)
Melting point	17 to 18 °C (63 to 64 °F; 290 to 291 K)
Solubility in water	11 mg/L (24 °C)
- Except where otherwise noted, data are given for materials in their standard state (at 25 °C [77 °F], 100 kPa). Infobox references

Phenthoate is an organothiophosphate insecticide. It is used against Lepidoptera, jassids, aphids, soft scales, mosquitoes, blowflies, houseflies, and ked.
