= Chlormephos =

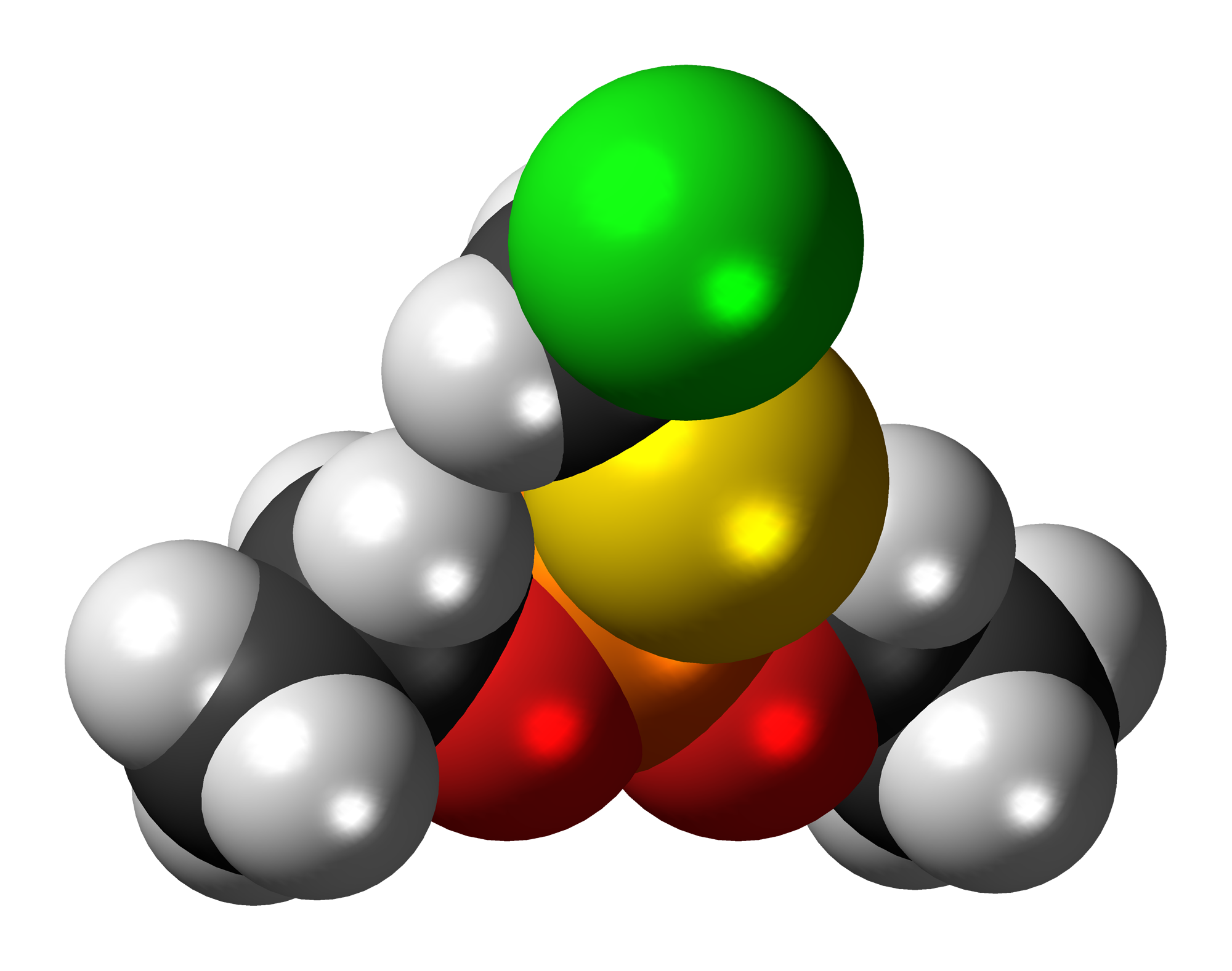

Names
- Preferred IUPAC name S-(Chloromethyl) O,O-diethyl phosphorodithioate
- Other names Chlormethylfos

Identifiers
CAS Number	24934-91-6
3D model (JSmol)	Interactive image
ChemSpider	30345
ECHA InfoCard	100.042.292
PubChem CID	32739
UNII	1N10F47JUS
CompTox Dashboard (EPA)	DTXSID1037511
- InChI: InChI=1S/C5H12ClO2PS2/c1-3-7-9(10,8-4-2)11-5-6/h3-5H2,1-2H3 Key: QGTYWWGEWOBMAK-UHFFFAOYSA-N; InChI=1/C5H12ClO2PS2/c1-3-7-9(10,8-4-2)11-5-6/h3-5H2,1-2H3 Key: QGTYWWGEWOBMAK-UHFFFAOYAZ
- SMILES: ClCSP(=S)(OCC)OCC

Properties
Chemical formula	C_{5}H_{12}ClO_{2}PS_{2}
Molar mass	234.69 g·mol^{−1}
- Except where otherwise noted, data are given for materials in their standard state (at 25 °C [77 °F], 100 kPa). Infobox references

Chlormephos (chemical formula: C_{5}H_{12}ClO_{2}PS_{2}) is an organothiophosphate insecticide. It is classified as an extremely hazardous substance in the United States as defined in Section 302 of the U.S. Emergency Planning and Community Right-to-Know Act (42 U.S.C. 11002), and is subject to strict reporting requirements by facilities which produce, store, or use it in significant quantities.

Chloromephos exhibits its toxic effects via the inhibition of the enzyme acetylcholinesterase, this is the same mechanism of action as the notorious chemical weapons known as V-series nerve agents.
