= Cadusafos =

Thiosulfate insecticide against nematodes

Clinical data
- Trade names: Cadusafos

Legal status
- Legal status: US: not approved; EU: not approved

Pharmacokinetic data
- Bioavailability: 90-100%
- Metabolism: >90%
- Metabolites: hydroxy sulfones, phosphorothioic and sulfonic acids
- Elimination half-life: not available
- Excretion: kidney, renal

Identifiers
- IUPAC name: S,S-di-sec-butyl O-ethyl phosphorodithioate
- CAS Number: 95465-99-9
- PubChem CID: 91752
- ChemSpider: 82850
- UNII: 8JBJ4VO75K
- KEGG: C18395
- ChEBI: CHEBI:38588
- ChEMBL: ChEMBL2228571
- CompTox Dashboard (EPA): DTXSID7037505
- ECHA InfoCard: 100.108.705

Chemical and physical data
- Formula: C_{10}H_{23}O_{2}PS_{2}
- Molar mass: 270.39 g·mol^{−1}
- 3D model (JSmol): Interactive image
- Density: 1.054 g/cm^{3}
- Boiling point: 112–114 °C (234–237 °F)
- Solubility in water: 0.248 g/L
- SMILES: CCC(C)SP(=O)(OCC)SC(C)CC
- InChI: InChI=1S/C10H23O2PS2/c1-6-9(4)14-13(11,12-8-3)15-10(5)7-2/h9-10H,6-8H2,1-5H3; Key:KXRPCFINVWWFHQ-UHFFFAOYSA-N

Cadusafos (2-[butan-2-ylsulfanyl(ethoxy)phosphoryl]sulfanylbutane) is a chemical insecticide and nematicide often used against parasitic nematode populations. The compound acts as a acetylcholinesterase inhibitor. It belongs the chemical class of synthetic organic thiophosphates and it is a volatile and persistent clear liquid. It is used on food crops such as tomatoes, bananas and chickpeas. It is currently not approved by the European Commission for use in the EU. Exposure can occur through inhalation, ingestion or contact with the skin. The compound is highly toxic to nematodes, earthworms and birds but poses limited risks to humans.

== History ==
A patent application for Cadusafos was first filed in Europe on August 13, 1982 by FMC Corporation, an American chemical company which originated as an insecticide producer. In their patent application, they claimed that the compound should preferably be used to “control nematodes and soil insects, but may also control some insects which feed on the above ground portions of the plant.” The patent is expired, meaning that the compound is commercially available from chemical vendors such as Sigma Aldrich. However, the pesticide is not approved for use in Europe due to the lack of information on consumer exposure and the risk to groundwater.

== Structure and reactivity ==
Cadusafos is a synthetic organic thiophosphate compound which is observed as a volatile and persistent clear liquid. The toxin is an organothiophosphate insecticide. Organothiophosphorus compounds are identified as compounds which contain carbonphosphorus bonds where the phosphorus atom is also bound to sulphur. Many of these compounds serve as insecticides and cholinergic agents. Cadusafos contains the phosphorus atom bound to two sulphurs which are attached to iso-butyl substituents. The phosphorus is also connected to oxygen by a double bond and is bound to an ethyl ether group. The exact reactivity of Cadusafos as well as that of organothiophosphate compounds in general is, as of yet, unknown. However, the cholinesterase enzyme inhibition mechanism of action of these compounds works similarly to other organophosphates. Examples of organophosphates include chemical weapons such as sarin and VX as well as pesticides like malathion.

== Synthesis ==
The synthesis of Cadusafos can be performed via the substitution reaction of O-ethyl phosphoric dichloride and two equivalents of 2-butanethiol.

== Mechanism of action ==
Cadusafos is an inhibitor of the enzyme acetylcholinesterase. This enzyme binds to acetylcholine and cleaves it into choline and acetate. Acetylcholine is a neurotransmitter which is used in neurons to pass on a neural stimulus. Cadusafos inhibits the function of acetylcholinesterase by occupying the active site of the enzyme which will no longer be able to function properly, resulting in the accumulation of acetylcholine. This might result in excessive nervous stimulation, respiratory failure and death. Cadusafos is an organothiophosphate, which is a subclass of organophosphates. Organophosphates can act as an inhibitor for acetylcholinesterase in a way for which the mechanism is known. The active site of acetylcholinesterase contains an anionic site and an esteratic site. This esteratic side contains a serine at the 200th position, which usually binds acetylcholine. Organophosphate inhibitors can phosphorylate this serine and with that inhibit the enzyme.

== Metabolism and biotransformation ==
In a study, 14C radiolabeled Cadusafos was administered orally to rats. The excretion of feces, urine and CO_{2} was monitored for seven days. This showed that cadusafos is readily absorbed (90-100%) and mainly eliminated via urine (around 75%), followed by elimination via expired air (10-15%) and via feces (5-15%). Over 90% of the administered dose was eliminated within 48 hours after administration. Analysis of tissue and blood samples collected after seven days showed a remaining radioactivity between 1-3%. The majority of this radioactivity was found in fat, liver, kidney and lung tissue and no evidence of accumulation was found. A different study was performed in order to identify the metabolites formed in rats after receiving either an oral or intravenous dose of Cadusafos. The metabolic products were analyzed using several analysis methods (HPLC, TLC, GC-MS, ^{1}H-NMR and liquid scintillation). This indicated the presence of the parent compound, Cadusafos, as well as 10 other metabolites. The main pathway of metabolism involves the cleavage of the thio-(sec-butyl) group, forming two primary products: Sec-butyl mercaptan and Oethyl-S-(2-butyl) phosphorothioic acid (OSPA). These intermediate compounds are then degraded further into several metabolites. The major metabolites were hydroxysulfones, followed by phosphorothionic acids and sulfonic acids, which then form conjugates.

== Toxicity ==
A study has been conducted by the Joint FAO/WHO Meeting on Pesticide Residues (JMPR), on rats in which the lethal dose of Cadusafos was investigated. The researchers found a median lethal dose via the oral pathway of 68.4 mg/kg bodyweight (bw) in male rats and 82.1 mg/kg bw in female rats. The rats died of typical symptoms of acetylcholinesterase inhibition. Via the dermal pathway, lower median lethal doses were found; mg/kg bw in males and 41.8 mg/kg bw in females. Considering the toxicity in humans, there is no data available yet regarding the median lethal dose for a human. The United States Environmental Protection Agency (EPA), did publish a report on the safety concerns of Cadusafos used as a pesticide on bananas and concluded that “Potential acute and chronic dietary exposures from eating bananas treated with Cadusafos are below the level of concern for the entire U.S. population, including infants and children.”

== Effects on animals ==
Cadusafos has been proved to be toxic to fish, aquatic invertebrates, bees, earthworms and other arthropods. Further research was conducted on terrestrial vertebrates, and it is expected to have toxic effects on mammals. Besides its direct toxicity to multiple species, Cadusafos also has a potential to bioaccumulate so secondary poisoning for earthworm eating mammals and birds should also be taken into consideration. The estimated risk to bees and aquatic organisms is low due to the application of Cadusafos, even though the toxicity to bees is high. The compound is also estimated to be highly toxic to earthworms and birds. A multigeneration study in rats has established a No Adverse Effect Level (NOAEL) of 0.03 mg/kg bw per day for the inhibition of cholinesterase activity in plasma and erythrocytes. There has been no adequate evidence that Cadusafos could prove a genotoxic compound. Due to this and additional research on mice and rats which proved Cadusafos as non-carcinogenic, it can be concluded that Cadusafos is non-carcinogenic for humans.

== Efficacy ==
Cadusafos proved to be very effective against parasitic nematode populations such as Rotylenchulus reniformis and Meloidogyne incognita. It showed to be more effective against endoparasitic nematodes than ectoparasitic nematodes and when compared to other nematicides like triazophos, methyl bromide, aldicarb, carbofuran and phorate, Cadusafos proved to be the most efficient. The effectiveness of Cadusafos improves when increasing the dosage or the exposure time. Efficacy after application for several successive cropping seasons seemed to remain the same for up to four seasons. However, when it is used for more than 4 consecutive seasons, this can cause a linear decrease in the efficacy.
