= Tebupirimfos =

Names
- Preferred IUPAC name O-(2-tert-Butylpyrimidin-5-yl) O-ethyl O-(propan-2-yl) phosphorothioate
- Other names Tebupirimphos; Phostebupirim; MAT 7484; BAY-MAT 7484; HSDB 7136; Aztec

Identifiers
CAS Number	96182-53-5
3D model (JSmol)	Interactive image
ChemSpider	84419
ECHA InfoCard	100.111.584
PubChem CID	93516
UNII	P036T39NSI
UN number	UN2810
CompTox Dashboard (EPA)	DTXSID1032482
- InChI: InChI=1S/C13H23N2O3PS/c1-7-16-19(20,17-10(2)3)18-11-8-14-12(15-9-11)13(4,5)6/h8-10H,7H2,1-6H3
- SMILES: S=P(OC(C)C)(OCC)OC1=CN=C(C(C)(C)C)N=C1

Properties
Chemical formula	C_{13}H_{23}N_{2}O_{3}PS
Molar mass	318.37 g·mol^{−1}
Appearance	Amber to brown liquid
Density	1.146 g/cm^{3}
Boiling point	135 °C (275 °F; 408 K) 1.5 mmHg

Hazards
NFPA 704 (fire diamond)	4 1 1
Flash point	93 °C (199 °F; 366 K)

Related compounds
- Except where otherwise noted, data are given for materials in their standard state (at 25 °C [77 °F], 100 kPa). Infobox references

Tebupirimfos, also known as phostebupirim, is an organothiophosphate insecticide. It is used on corn crops, including popcorn.

== Additional resources ==
- United States, Environmental Protection Agency. Report on FQPA tolerance reassessment progress and interim risk management decision : phostebupirim. DIANE Publishing. ISBN 1428902163.
