= Bifenthrin =

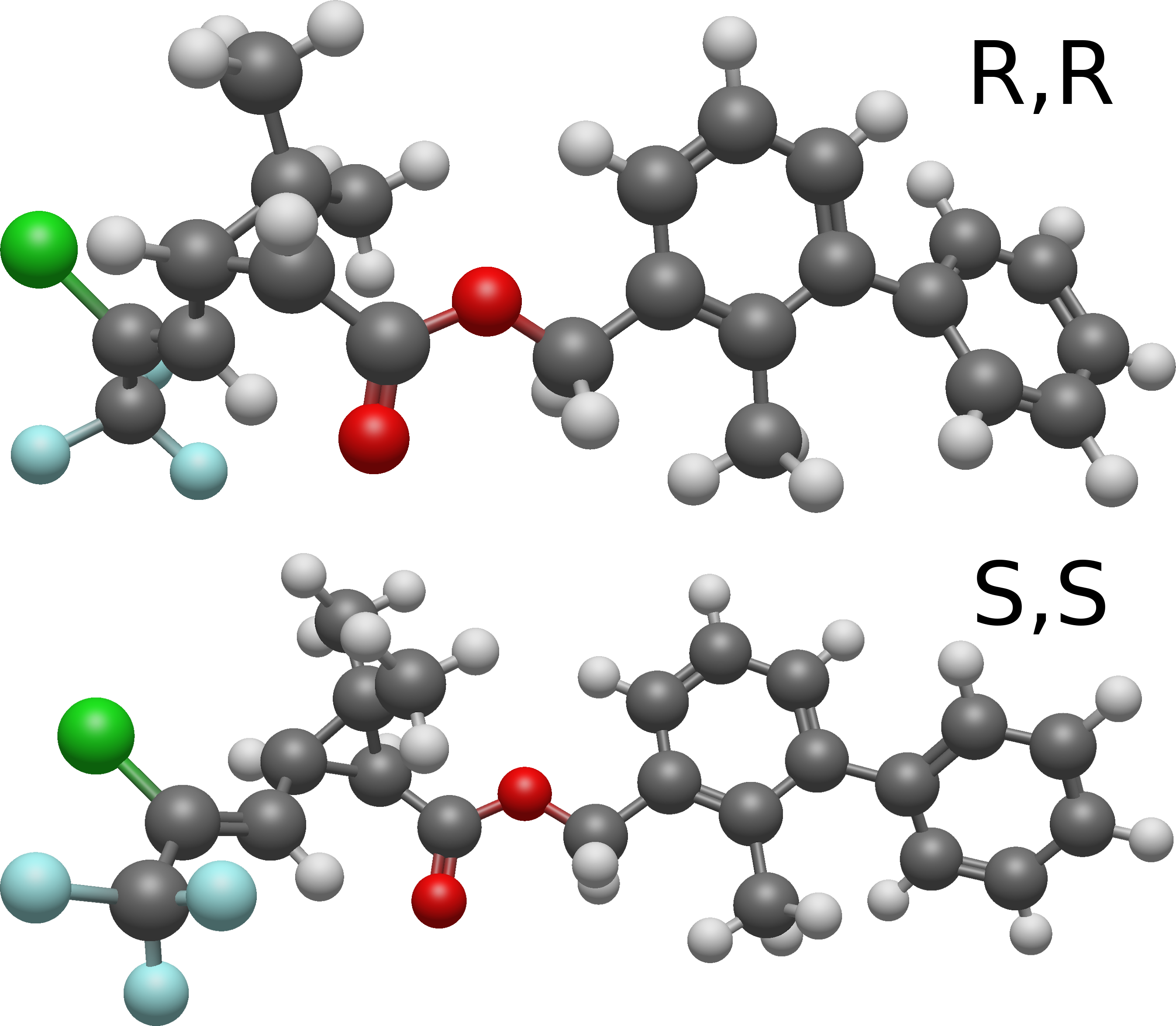

Names
- Preferred IUPAC name rel-(2-Methyl[1,1′-biphenyl]-3-yl)methyl (1R,3R)-3-[(1Z)-2-chloro-3,3,3-trifluoroprop-1-en-1-yl]-2,2-dimethylcyclopropane-1-carboxylate

Identifiers
CAS Number	82657-04-3
3D model (JSmol)	Interactive image; Interactive image
ChEMBL	ChEMBL44019
ChemSpider	9114004
ECHA InfoCard	100.120.070
KEGG	C10980
PubChem CID	10938769
UNII	6B66JED0KN
CompTox Dashboard (EPA)	DTXSID20669951 DTXSID9020160, DTXSID20669951
- InChI: InChI=1S/C23H22ClF3O2/c1-14-16(10-7-11-17(14)15-8-5-4-6-9-15)13-29-21(28)20-18(22(20,2)3)12-19(24)23(25,26)27/h4-12,18,20H,13H2,1-3H3/b19-12-/t18-,20-/m1/s1 Key: OMFRMAHOUUJSGP-JHEGMOCKSA-N; InChI=1/2C23H22ClF3O2/c2*1-14-16(10-7-11-17(14)15-8-5-4-6-9-15)13-29-21(28)20-18(22(20,2)3)12-19(24)23(25,26)27/h2*4-12,18,20H,13H2,1-3H3/b2*19-12-/t2*18-,20-/m10/s1 Key: OXCDWLBJSLVWHB-LKRLXIKPBY
- SMILES: Cc1c(cccc1c2ccccc2)COC(=O)C3C(C3(C)C)C=C(C(F)(F)F)Cl; Cl\C(=C/[C@@H]3[C@H](C(=O)OCc2cccc(c1ccccc1)c2C)C3(C)C)C(F)(F)F

Properties
Chemical formula	C_{23}H_{22}ClF_{3}O_{2}
Molar mass	422.87 g·mol^{−1}
Solubility in water	0.1 mg/L

Hazards
- Occupational safety and health (OHS/OSH)
Main hazards	irritant and aquatic pollutant
- Except where otherwise noted, data are given for materials in their standard state (at 25 °C [77 °F], 100 kPa). verify (what is ?) Infobox references

Bifenthrin is a pyrethroid insecticide. It is widely used against ant infestations.

== Chemical properties ==
Bifenthrin is poorly soluble in water and often remains in soil. Its residual half-life in soil is between 7 days and 8 months, depending on the soil type, with a low mobility in most soil types. Bifenthrin has the longest known residual time in soil of insecticides currently on the market. It is a white, waxy solid with a faint sweet smell. It is chemically synthesized in various forms, including powder, granules and pellets. However, it is not naturally occurring.

Like other pyrethroids, bifenthrin is chiral; it has different enantiomers which can have different effects. Bifenthrin is found in two enantiomers: 1S-cis-bifenthrin and 1R-cis-bifenthrin. 1S-cis-Bifenthrin is 3-4 times more toxic to humans than 1R-cis-bifenthrin, while the latter is more than 300 times more effective as a pesticide.

== Toxicity ==
=== Toxicodynamics ===
There are two types of pyrethroids: those with and without α-cyanogroup. The neurotoxicity of bifenthrin is based on the affinity to the voltage-gated sodium channels (in insects as well as mammals). The pyrethroids with an α-cyanogroup block the sodium-channel permanently, causing the membrane to be permanently hyperpolarized. The resting potential will not be restored, and no further action potential can be generated. The pyrethroids without an α-cyanogroup, to which bifenthrin belongs, are only able to bind to the sodium channel transiently. This will result in after potentials and eventual continuous firing of axons. The resting potential is not affected by these pyrethroids.

Bifenthrin will open the sodium channel for a shorter period than other pyrethroids. The mechanism in mammals and invertebrates is not different, but the effect on mammals is much weaker due to their higher body temperature, their higher body volume, and the lower affinity of bifenthrin to sodium channels.

=== Toxicokinetics ===
Numerous studies have been conducted on the half life of bifenthrin in soil, water, and air under different conditions, such as aerobic or anaerobic, and at different temperatures and pH. It is more likely to remain in the soil and not so much in water (it is hydrophobic), nor in the air (it is unlikely to volatilize because of its physical properties). Because of the water-insolubility of bifenthrin, it will not rapidly cause contamination of ground water. However, some contamination might occur by soil bound bifenthrin to surface water through runoff. For an overview of the environmental degradation of bifenthrin, see figure below. The main path of degradation results in 4'-hydroxy bifenthrin.

==== Biotransformation ====
Pyrethroids are much less toxic in mammals than they are in insects and fish, because mammals have the ability to rapidly break the ester bond in bifenthrin and break the substance into its inactive acid and alcohol components. In humans and rats, bifenthrin is degraded by the cytochrome p450-family.

=== Toxicology ===
==== Toxicity in animals ====
Mosquitoes

Bifenthrin is an effective pesticide to use against malaria and filaria vector mosquitoes. It is still effective when resistance to other pyrethroids is found. Mosquito nets and indoor walls can be treated with bifenthrin to keep more mosquitoes away. Bifenthrin is an effectively used insecticide, but the risk is high of it working only for a short time. Mosquitoes can develop a resistance to it, as well.

Aquatic life

Bifenthrin is hardly soluble in water, so nearly all bifenthrin will stay in the sediment, but it is very harmful to aquatic life. Even in small concentrations, fish and other aquatic animals are affected by bifenthrin. One of the reasons for the high sensitivity of fish is fish have a slow metabolism. Bifenthrin will stay longer in the system of the fish. Another reason for the high sensitivity of fish is the effect of bifenthrin as ATPase-inhibitor. The gills need ATP to control the osmotic balance of oxygen. If the fish is no longer capable of taking up oxygen because ATP can no longer be used, the fish will die. In cold water, bifenthrin is even more dangerous. pH and calcium concentration are also factors that influence the toxicity. Vertebrates are less sensitive to the effects of bifenthrin as ATPase-inhibitor.

Bees

In bees, the lethal concentration (LC_{50}) of bifenthrin is about 17 mg/L. At sublethal concentrations, bifenthrin reduces the fecundity of bees, decreases the rate at which bee larvae develop into adults, and increases their immature periods.

Table of LD_{50} values

Species	LD_{50}
Female rats	54 mg/kg
Male rats	70 mg/kg
Mice	43 mg/kg
Mallard ducks	2150 mg/kg
Bobwhite quail	1800 mg/kg
Rainbow trout	0.00015 mg/L
Bluegill	0.00035 mg/L
Daphnia	0.0016 mg/L

==== Toxicity in humans ====
Bifenthrin and other synthetic pyrethroids are being used in agriculture in increasing amounts because of the high efficiency of these substances in killing insects, the low toxicity for mammals, and good biodegradability. However, because of its success, they are being used more often (also indoors) and high exposure of bifenthrin to humans can occur.

===== Carcinogenicity =====
The U.S. EPA classified bifenthrin as a Category C possible human carcinogen. This rating is based on an increased rate of urinary bladder tumors in mice, adenoma and adenocarcinoma of the liver in male mice, and bronchoalveolar adenomas and adenocarcinomas of the lung in some female mice.

===== Neurotoxicity =====
Bifenthrin can be absorbed by humans either by skin contact or ingestion. Skin contact is not toxic, causing only a slight tingling sensation at the point of contact. Ingestion in concentrations below 10^{−4} M is not toxic. However, commercially available bifenthrin products formulated for household use (such as Ortho Home Defense Max, sold as a liquid pump spray), can induce toxic effects due to other chemicals added to improve the sustainability of bifenthrin or are toxic on their own. Symptoms of excessive exposure are nausea, headaches, hypersensitivity for touch and sound, and irritation of the skin and the eyes.

== Regulation ==
The EPA monitors and regulates the use of pesticides in the United States. Because of its high toxicity to aquatic organisms, bifenthrin is classified as a restricted-use pesticide, meaning it may only be sold to certified pesticide applicators. However, the EPA allows lower concentrations of bifenthrin to be sold to the general public.

Bifenthrin has been approved for use against the Rasberry crazy ant in the Houston, Texas, area, under a special "crisis exemption" from the Texas Department of Agriculture and the EPA. The chemical is only approved for use in Texas counties experiencing "confirmed infestations" of the newly imported, invasive ant species.

The EPA has classified bifenthrin as a class C carcinogen, a possible human carcinogen based on a test with mice, which showed increased development of certain tumors.

An acute and chronic reference dose (RfD) for bifenthrin has been established, based on animal studies. The reference dose resembles the estimated quantity of a chemical which a person could be exposed to every day (or a one-time exposure for the acute RfD) without any appreciable risk of adverse health effects. The acute reference dose (RfD) for bifenthrin is 0.328 mg/kg bodyweight/day. The chronic reference dose (RfD) for bifenthrin is 0.013 mg/kg bodyweight/day.

Bifenthrin was included in a biocide ban proposed by the Swedish Chemicals Agency, because of its carcinogenic effect. This was approved by the European Parliament in 2009. At that time, pesticides containing bifenthrin were withdrawn from use in the European Union. They have since been reinstated in 2012.

Bifenthrin is banned for agricultural use in European union countries since July 2019 but is still approved for the preservation of chopped wood.

== Use ==
On a large scale, bifenthrin is often used against invasive red fire ants. It is also effective against aphids, worms, other ants, gnats, moths, beetles, earwigs, grasshoppers, mites, midges, spiders, ticks, yellow jackets, maggots, thrips, caterpillars, flies, fleas, spotted lanternflies and termites. It is mostly used in orchards, nurseries, and homes. In the agricultural sector, it is used in great amounts on certain crops, such as corn. About 70% of all hops and raspberries cultured in the United States are treated with bifenthrin.

Bifenthrin is used by the textile industry to protect woollen products from insect attack. It was introduced as an alternative to permethrin-based agents, due to greater efficacy against keratinophagous insects, better wash-fastness, and lower aquatic toxicity.

=== Products ===
Products containing bifenthrin include Sevin, Transport, Talstar, Maxxthor, Biforce, Capture, Brigade, Bifenthrine, DuoCide insect control, Ortho Home Defense Max, Bifen XTS, Bifen IT, Bifen L/P, Torant, Zipak, Scotts Turf Builder SummerGuard, Wisdom TC Flowable, FMC 54800, Allectus, Ortho Max Pro, OMS3024, Mega Wash, Fortune Ultra, Hovex Ultra Low Odor and Surefire Fivestar.
