= Metofluthrin =

Pyrethroid used as an insect repellent

Names
- IUPAC name 2,3,5,6-Tetrafluoro-4-(methoxymethyl)benzyl 2,2-dimethyl-3-(prop-1-en-1-yl)cyclopropanecarboxylate

Identifiers
| CAS Number | 240494-70-6 |
| 3D model (JSmol) | Interactive image |
| ChEBI | CHEBI:79396 |
| ChemSpider | 570989 |
| ECHA InfoCard | 100.213.669 |
| KEGG | C13487 |
| PubChem CID | 5282227 |
| UNII | WZX356S299 |
- InChI: InChI=1S/C18H20F4O3/c1-5-6-11-12(18(11,2)3)17(23)25-8-10-15(21)13(19)9(7-24-4)14(20)16(10)22/h5-6,11-12H,7-8H2,1-4H3 Key: KVIZNNVXXNFLMU-UHFFFAOYSA-N; InChI=1/C18H20F4O3/c1-5-6-11-12(18(11,2)3)17(23)25-8-10-15(21)13(19)9(7-24-4)14(20)16(10)22/h5-6,11-12H,7-8H2,1-4H3 Key: KVIZNNVXXNFLMU-UHFFFAOYAX
- SMILES: Fc1c(F)c(c(F)c(F)c1COC(=O)C2C(C=CC)C2(C)C)COC

Properties
| Chemical formula | C_{18}H_{20}F_{4}O_{3} |
| Molar mass | 360.349 g·mol^{−1} |
- Except where otherwise noted, data are given for materials in their standard state (at 25 °C [77 °F], 100 kPa). verify (what is ?) Infobox references

Metofluthrin is a pyrethroid used as an insect repellent. The vapors of metofluthrin are highly effective and capable of repelling up to 97% of mosquitoes in field tests. Metofluthrin is used in a variety of consumer products, called emanators, for indoor and outdoor use. These products produce a vapor that protects an individual or area. Effectiveness is reduced by air movement. Metofluthrin is neurotoxic, and is not meant to be applied directly to human skin.

Although metofluthrin has insecticidal properties against the sand fly, Phlebotomus sergenti, it is not an effective repellent of this insect.

== See also ==
- Phlebotomus, a genus of sand flies
- Mosquito coil, may contain metofluthrin
- Off! (brand), some products contain metofluthrin
