= Cyhalothrin =

Synthetic pyrethroid used as insecticide

Lambda-cyhalothrin
- λ-cyhalothrin (racemic)

Names
- IUPAC name (R)-α-cyano-3-phenoxybenzyl (1S)-cis-3-[(Z)-2-chloro-3,3,3-trifluoropropenyl]-2,2-dimethylcyclopropanecarboxylate and (S)-α-cyano-3-phenoxybenzyl (1R)-cis-3-[(Z)-2-chloro-3,3,3-trifluoropropenyl]-2,2-dimethylcyclopropanecarboxylate
- Other names Cyhalothrine

Identifiers
- Compounds; Lambda: λ-Cyhalothrin; (RS)-α-cyano (1RS,3RS): Cyhalothrin; Gamma: γ-Cyhalothrin
CAS Number	Lambda: 91465-08-6; (RS)-α-cyano (1RS,3RS): 68085-85-8; Gamma: 76703-62-3
3D model (JSmol)	Gamma: Interactive image
ChEBI	Gamma: CHEBI:39323
ChEMBL	Gamma: ChEMBL2270530
ChemSpider	Lambda: 9680967; Gamma: 4944812
ECHA InfoCard	100.062.209
EC Number	(RS)-α-cyano (1RS,3RS): 268-450-2; Gamma: 616-373-3
PubChem CID	Lambda: 71464055; (RS)-α-cyano (1RS,3RS): 5281873; Gamma: 6440554
RTECS number	Lambda: GZ1227780
UNII	Lambda: Z44TGV333K; (RS)-α-cyano (1RS,3RS): V0V73PEB8M; Gamma: GOI9BD654Y
UN number	2588
CompTox Dashboard (EPA)	Lambda: DTXSID6023997
- InChI: Lambda: InChI=1S/2C23H19ClF3NO3/c2*1-22(2)17(12-19(24)23(25,26)27)20(22)21(29)31-18(13-28)14-7-6-10-16(11-14)30-15-8-4-3-5-9-15/h2*3-12,17-18,20H,1-2H3/b2*19-12-/t2*17-,18+,20-/m10/s1 Key: BFPGVJIMBRLFIR-GUCBCRIZSA-N; (RS)-α-cyano (1RS,3RS): InChI=1S/4C23H19ClF3NO3/c4*1-22(2)17(12-19(24)23(25,26)27)20(22)21(29)31-18(13-28)14-7-6-10-16(11-14)30-15-8-4-3-5-9-15/h4*3-12,17-18,20H,1-2H3/b4*19-12-/t2*17-,18+,20-;2*17-,18-,20-/m1010/s1 Key: OOAOVGPMANECPJ-RWEUCVCFSA-N; Gamma: InChI=1S/C23H19ClF3NO3/c1-22(2)17(12-19(24)23(25,26)27)20(22)21(29)31-18(13-28)14-7-6-10-16(11-14)30-15-8-4-3-5-9-15/h3-12,17-18,20H,1-2H3/b19-12-/t17-,18+,20-/m0/s1 Key: ZXQYGBMAQZUVMI-GCMPRSNUSA-N; Key: ZXQYGBMAQZUVMI-UHFFFAOYSA-N
- SMILES: Gamma: CC1([C@H]([C@H]1C(=O)O[C@H](C#N)C2=CC(=CC=C2)OC3=CC=CC=C3)/C=C(/C(F)(F)F)\Cl)C

Properties
Chemical formula	C_{23}H_{19}ClF_{3}NO_{3}
Molar mass	449.85 g·mol^{−1}
Appearance	Colourless solid
Density	1.33 g/cm^{3}
Melting point	49.2 °C (120.6 °F; 322.3 K)
Boiling point	Decomposes before boiling
Solubility in water	0.005 mg/L [20 °C]
Solubility in other solvents	Very soluble in hexane, toluene, methanol, acetone
log P	5.5
Acidity (pK_{a})	Not applicable

Pharmacology
ATCvet code	QP53AC06 (WHO)

Hazards
- GHS labelling
Pictograms	(GHS06: Toxic) (GHS07: Exclamation mark) (GHS09: Environmental hazard)
Signal word	Danger
Hazard statements	H301, H312, H330, H410
Precautionary statements	P260, P264, P270, P271, P273, P280, P284, P301+P310, P302+P352, P304+P340, P310, P312, P320, P321, P330, P363, P391, P403+P233, P405, P501
NFPA 704 (fire diamond)	3 1 1
Flash point	225 °C (437 °F; 498 K)
- Except where otherwise noted, data are given for materials in their standard state (at 25 °C [77 °F], 100 kPa). Infobox references

Cyhalothrin (ISO common name) is an organic compound that, in specific isomeric forms, is used as a pesticide. It is a pyrethroid, a class of synthetic insecticides that mimic the structure and properties of the naturally occurring insecticide pyrethrin which is present in the flowers of Chrysanthemum cinerariifolium. Pyrethroids, such as cyhalothrin, are often preferred as an active ingredient in agricultural insecticides because they are more cost-effective and longer acting than natural pyrethrins. λ-and γ-cyhalothrin are now used to control insects and spider mites in crops including cotton, cereals, potatoes and vegetables.

== Structure and stereochemistry ==

Gamma-cyhalothrin and lambda-cyhalothrin are the active ingredients in the current commercial products based on cyhalothrin. Both are cyanohydrin esters of cis-3-[(Z)-2-chloro-3,3,3-trifluoropropenyl]-2,2-dimethylcyclopropanecarboxylic acid. All of the insecticidal activity is due to the proportion of absolute stereochemistry (1R) in the mixture. The active isomer of deltamethrin, (1R)-cis-3-(2,2-dibromovinyl)-2,2-dimethylcyclopropanecarboxylic acid, has the same stereochemistry.

γ-cyhalothrin (a single chiral isomer) is indeed twice as active as λ-cyhalothrin on a weight-for-weight basis. The latter is racemic and contains the (1R) and inactive (1S) isomers in equal amounts.

== History ==
By 1974, a team of Rothamsted Research scientists had discovered three pyrethroids (MoA 3a), suitable for use in agriculture, namely permethrin, cypermethrin and deltamethrin. These compounds were subsequently licensed by the NRDC, as NRDC 143, 149 and 161 respectively, to companies which could then develop them for sale in defined territories. Imperial Chemical Industries (ICI) obtained licenses to permethrin and cypermethrin but their agreement with the NRDC did not allow worldwide sales. Also, it was clear to ICI's own researchers at Jealott's Hill that future competition in the marketplace might be difficult owing to the greater potency of deltamethrin compared to the other compounds. For that reason, in the period 1974–1977, chemists there sought patentable analogues which might have advantages compared to the Rothamsted insecticides by having wider spectrum or greater cost-benefit. The first breakthrough was made when a trifluoromethyl group was used to replace one of the chlorines in cypermethrin, especially when the double bond was in its Z form. The resulting material was found to be more potent than cypermethrin, to which it is most closely related, but also with good activity against the spider mite Tetranychus urticae, which added to its attractiveness as a potential new product. The second breakthrough occurred when ICI process chemists developed a practical manufacturing process for the Z-cis acid, by controlling the stereochemistry of the cyclopropane ring in addition to that of the double bond. This led to the initial commercialisation of cyhalothrin, under the trade name Grenade, but the resulting material was still a mixture of four isomers owing to the racemic nature of the Z-cis acid and because the alpha-cyano group was a 1:1 mixture of possible R and S configurations.

The process work made available a relatively large supply of the Z-cis acid and hence allowed two further commercially important steps to be taken. The first was to make the development and sales of tefluthrin feasible and the second was to spur research directed at making compositions of cyhalothrin with fewer isomers in the sales product. After further research and field tests, ICI chose to focus on λ-cyhalothrin, the mixture containing the single most active isomer together with its mirror image. This so-called "enantiomer pair", ICI code number PP321, could be used after a process for its economic production and purification was developed using crystallisation with recycling of the unwanted enantiomer pair.

The new product was first launched in nine countries in 1985 using the trademark Karate. At that time, γ-cyhalothrin, ICI code number PP345, was not a feasible alternative product owing to the difficulty of manufacturing that isomer alone, especially if this involved recycling the "wrong" isomer of the Z-cis acid. In 2000, the agrochemical business of ICI merged with that of Novartis to form Syngenta, which still manufactures and supplies λ-cyhalothrin. The patents covering the parent compound expired in most major markets in 2003. FMC has entered the market as a supplier of γ-cyhalothrin for use as a broad-spectrum insecticide under the brand name Scion.

== Mechanism of action ==
Pyrethroids, including cyhalothrin, disrupt the functioning of the nervous system in an organism. They are fast-acting axonic excitotoxins, the toxic effects of which are mediated by preventing the closure of the voltage-gated sodium channels in axonal membranes. The sodium channel is a membrane protein with a hydrophilic interior. This interior is shaped precisely to allow sodium ions to pass through the membrane, enter the axon, and propagate an action potential. The binding of the insecticide to the protein keeps the channels in their open state, so the nerves cannot repolarize, thereby paralyzing the organism. One consequence of the mode of action is that cyhalothrin has useful knockdown properties. That is, affected larvae rapidly cease feeding and may fall off the crop; flying insects drop to the ground. Paralysis and death follows provided the insect has absorbed a sufficient dose.

== Formulations ==
λ-cyhalothrin is made available to end-users only in formulated products. Since the active ingredient has very low solubility in water, formulations aid its use in water-based sprays by creating an emulsion when diluted. Modern products use non-powdery formulations with reduced or no use of hazardous solvents: Examples include the capsule suspensions Warrior II and Tandem, a mix with thiamethoxam, both sold by Syngenta in the USA.

== Usage ==
All pesticides are required to seek registration from appropriate authorities in the country in which they will be used. In the United States, the Environmental Protection Agency (EPA) is responsible for regulating pesticides under the Federal Insecticide, Fungicide, and Rodenticide Act (FIFRA) and the Food Quality Protection Act (FQPA). A pesticide can only be used legally according to the directions on the label that is included at the time of the sale of the pesticide. The purpose of the label is "to provide clear directions for effective product performance while minimizing risks to human health and the environment". A label is a legally binding document that mandates how the pesticide can and must be used and failure to follow the label as written when using the pesticide is a federal offence. Within the European Union, a 2-tiered approach is used for the approval and authorisation of pesticides. Before a formulated product can be developed for market, the active substance must be approved for the European Union. After this has been achieved, authorisation for the specific product must be sought from every Member State that the applicant wants to sell it to. Afterwards, there is a monitoring programme to make sure the pesticide residues in food are below the limits set by the European Food Safety Authority.

=== Agriculture ===
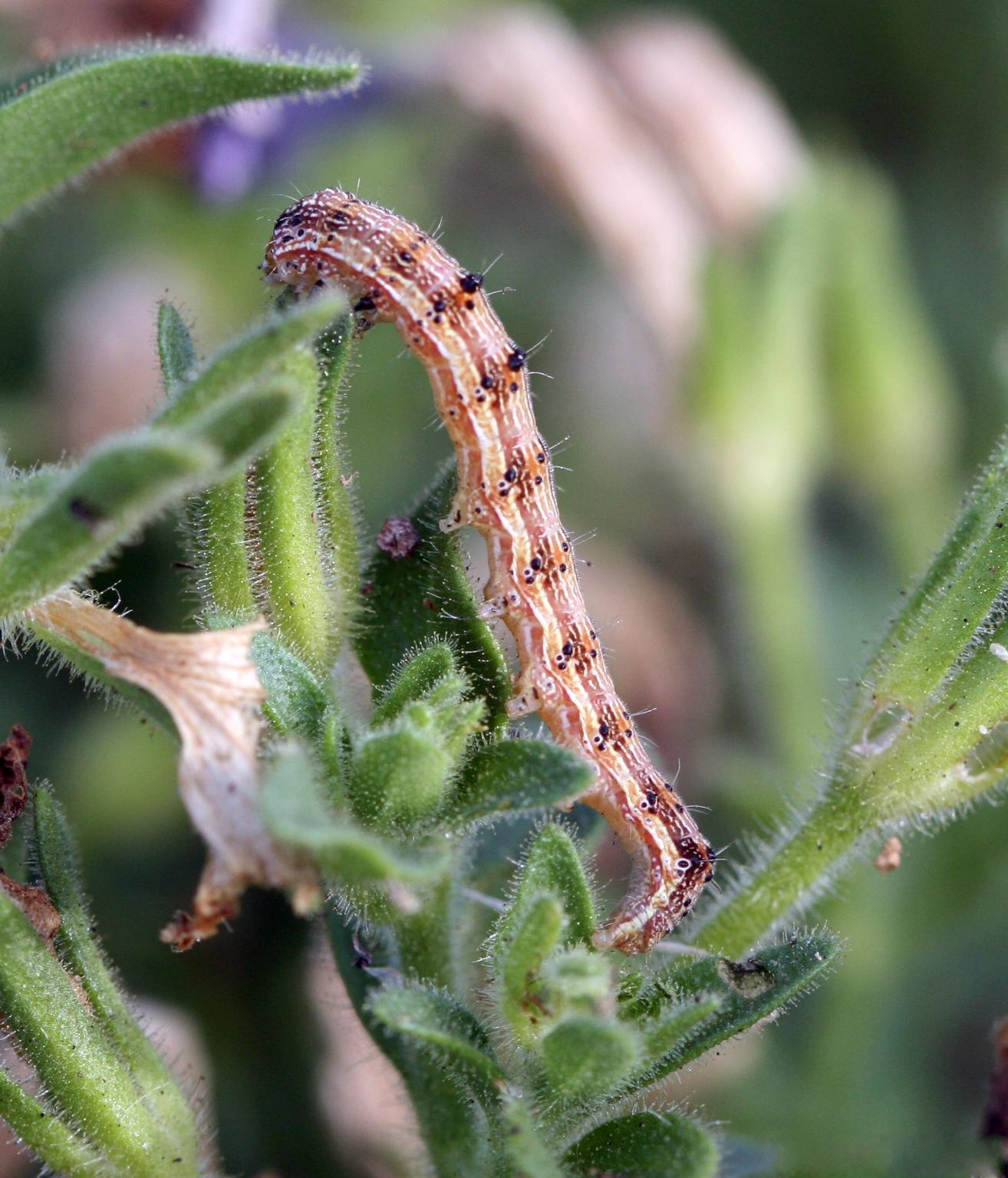
Heliothis virescens, typical pest controlled by cyhalothrin

The first, and still main, use of λ-cyhalothrin is to control the larvae of lepidopteran pests on crops such as cotton and cereals.

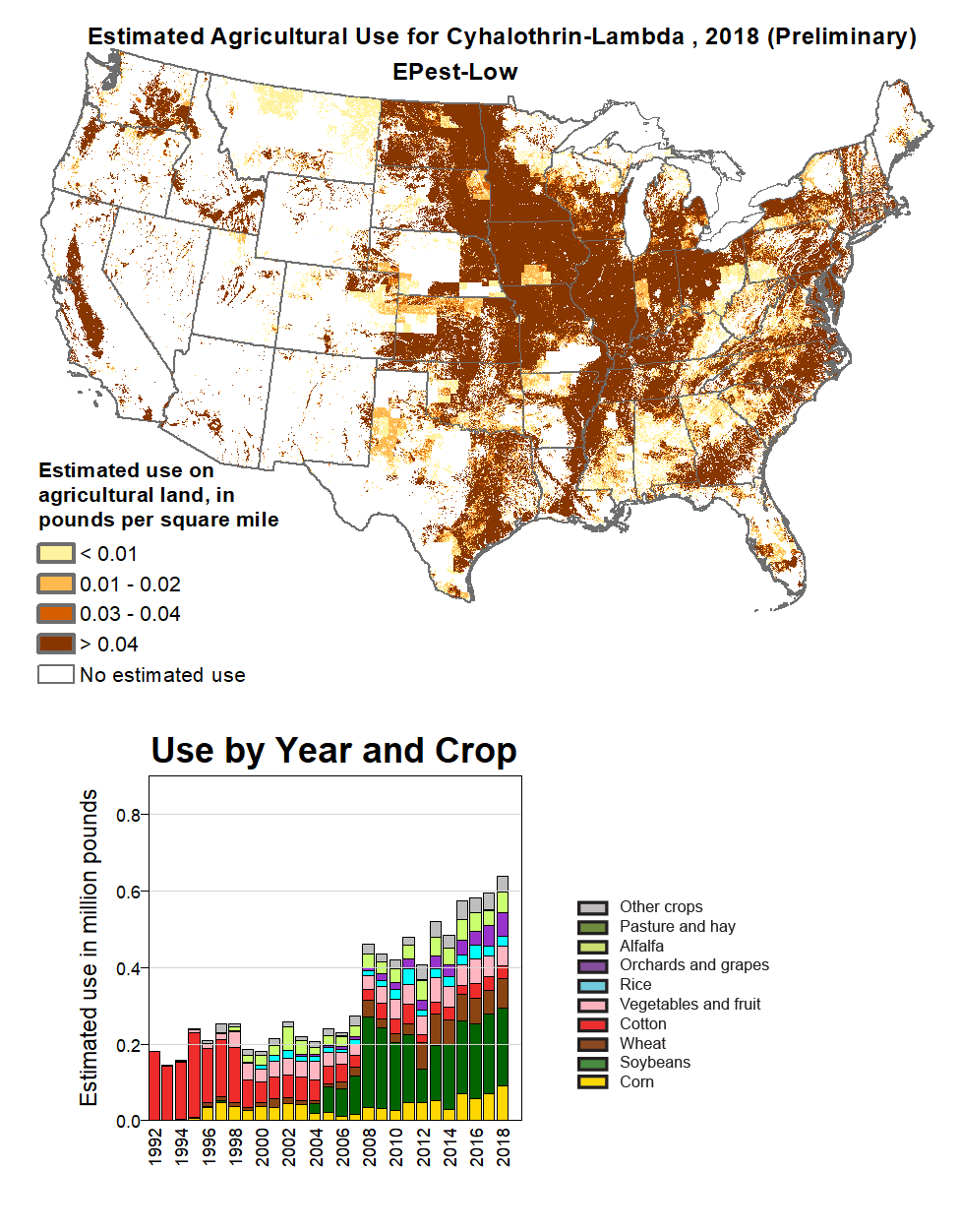
Estimated use of λ-cyhalothrin in US agriculture to 2018

Once an active ingredient has achieved registration in major territories, suppliers often expand the market by seeking label approval for additional crops and pests, after field trials have been carried out to confirm the efficacy of the product in the new situation. In the case of λ-cyhalothrin, the current US label includes its use on alfalfa; canola; corn; rice; sorghum; cereals including barley, oats and wheat; vegetable crops including broccoli, cabbage and cauliflower; cotton; legumes including soybeans; lettuce; onion; peanuts; fruit including apples and pears; sugarcane; sunflower, and tobacco. The estimated annual use of λ-cyhalothrin in US agriculture is mapped by the US Geological Survey. While the original use was almost exclusively in cotton, the compound is now applied to many crops. In 2018, the latest date for which figures are available, 600,000 pounds (270,000 kg) were used. The equivalent map for γ-cyhalothrin is also available but its use was never high and is now declining.

=== Malarial vector control ===
Many insecticides, including DDT have been used to control mosquito species carrying the malaria parasite. The use of insecticide-treated bed nets has been shown to be an effective preventative measure. The World Health Organization (WHO) has approved λ-cyhalothrin (as its 2.5% capsule suspension formulation) for this use.

=== Termite control ===
In 2003, the EPA approved the use of Impasse termite blocker containing λ-cyhalothrin to control termites around building foundations, especially where plumbing, electrical, and other utilities penetrated the concrete. Use in this way was intended to give long-term protection from the pest. FMC later introduced a similar product using γ-cyhalothrin

== Human safety ==
Cyhalothrin is a restricted use pesticide. One consequence of this is that (in the USA) it is a violation of federal law to use the product in a manner inconsistent with its labelling and the labelling must be in possession of the user at the time of the application. It can be absorbed into the body by inhalation of dust or mist and by ingestion. It causes serious eye irritation. Symptoms of poisoning include burning sensation, convulsions, cough, laboured breathing, shortness of breath, sore throat. Skin exposure may also result in a sensation described as a tingling, itching, burning, or prickly feeling. Onset may occur immediately to four hours after exposure and may last 2–30 hours, without damage. First aid measures are included with the label information.

The World Health Organization (WHO) and Food and Agriculture Organization (FAO) joint meeting on pesticide residues has determined that the acceptable daily intake for λ-cyhalothrin is 0–0.02 mg/kg bodyweight per day. The Codex Alimentarius database maintained by the FAO lists the maximum residue limits for cyhalothrin isomers in various food products.

== Effects on the environment ==
While cyhalothrin is inherently highly toxic to many fish and aquatic invertebrate species, binding to soil and sediment reduces exposure and lessens the risk to fish: field studies found no significant adverse effects: according to the WHO expert committee, "The concentrations of cyhalothrin and lambda-cyhalothrin that are likely to arise in water from normal agricultural application will be low. Since the compound is rapidly adsorbed and degraded under natural conditions, there will not be any practical problems concerning the accumulation of residues or the toxicity of cyhalothrin or lambda-cyhalothrin in aquatic species.

Honeybees, Apis mellifera have been shown to be particularly sensitive to λ-cyhalothrin, with fatal doses as small as 0.04 micrograms per bee. However, field studies found few effects. Nevertheless, due to this sensitivity and pollinator decline, all pyrethroids are recommended to be applied at night to avoid typical pollinating hours, and not to be used in dust form.

In laboratory studies, alkaline water (pH of 9) degraded λ-cyhalothrin with an approximate half-life of 7 days, although at neutral and acidic pHs, degradation did not occur. Sunlight accelerates degradation in water and soil. Its half-life on plant surfaces is 5 days and it has a low potential to contaminate ground water due to its low water solubility and high potential to bind to soil organic matter. The LD_{50} is 56 mg/kg (rats, oral) and its effects on the environment have been summarized in many publications.

== Resistance management ==
As with many pesticides, species have the ability to evolve and develop resistance to pyrethroids. This potential can be mitigated by careful management. Reports of individual pest species becoming resistant to λ-cyhalothrin are monitored by manufacturers, regulatory bodies such as the EPA and the Insecticide Resistance Action Committee (IRAC). In some cases, the risks of resistance developing can be reduced by using a mixture of two or more insecticides which each have activity on relevant pests but with unrelated mechanisms of action. IRAC assigns insecticides into classes so as to facilitate this. For example, chlorantraniliprole (a diamide) and λ-cyhalothrin are now sold in mixture under the trade name Besiege.

== Brands ==
A comprehensive list of brand names for products containing λ-cyhalothrin and γ-cyhalothrin is not available. A brief set for the former are Karate, Kung-fu, Warrior, Cyzmic CS, Demand CS and Foliam. The latter has been sold using names including Bolton, Cobalt, Declare, Proaxis and Scion.

In the United States, Ortho "Home Defense" (for indoor use), Spectracide Bug Stop, Triazicide and Hot Shot are used in the home landscape and garden markets. The Pesticide Properties Database attempts to keep track of the major brands in use.
