= Barium hexafluorosilicate =

Names
- IUPAC name barium(2+);hexafluorosilicon(2-)
- Other names Barium silicofluoride, bariumsilicofluorid

Identifiers
CAS Number	17125-80-3
3D model (JSmol)	Interactive image
ChemSpider	26327
ECHA InfoCard	100.037.430
EC Number	241-189-1
PubChem CID	28299
UNII	W4A72RWE6Q
CompTox Dashboard (EPA)	DTXSID80884961
- InChI: InChI=1S/Ba.F6Si/c;1-7(2,3,4,5)6/q+2;-2 Key: RRLMRHFZRPYSNK-UHFFFAOYSA-N
- SMILES: F[Si-2](F)(F)(F)(F)F.[Ba+2]

Properties
Chemical formula	BaF_{6}Si
Molar mass	279.402 g·mol^{−1}
Appearance	White crystalline powder
Density	4.279 g/cm^{3}
Melting point	1580
Solubility in water	poorly soluble

Hazards
- GHS labelling
Pictograms	(GHS07: Exclamation mark)
Signal word	Warning
Hazard statements	H302, H332
Precautionary statements	P261, P264, P270, P271, P301+P317, P304+P340, P317, P330, P501
- Except where otherwise noted, data are given for materials in their standard state (at 25 °C [77 °F], 100 kPa). Infobox references

Barium hexafluorosilicate is an inorganic chemical compound with the chemical formula BaSiF_{6}.

== Synthesis ==
As a salt that is poorly soluble in water, barium hexafluorosilicate precipitates from solutions that contain barium ions (e.g. barium chloride as well as hexafluorosilicate ions (e.g. hexafluorosilicic acid).

BaCl_{2} + H_{2}[SiF_{6}] → Ba[SiF_{6}] + 2HCl

== Uses ==
The compound is used as a chemical reagent in experimental applications. In various chemical reactions and processes, the compound acts as a source of barium and hexafluorosilicate ions.

It was also used as an insecticide.
