= Oxazosulfyl =

Chemical insecticide

Names
- IUPAC name 2-(3-ethylsulfonyl-2-pyridinyl)-5-(trifluoromethylsulfonyl)-1,3-benzoxazole

Identifiers
CAS Number	1616678-32-0
3D model (JSmol)	Interactive image
ChemSpider	62285804
ECHA InfoCard	100.355.735
EC Number	881-235-3
PubChem CID	90258515
UNII	Q63MCC2PTT
CompTox Dashboard (EPA)	DTXSID601337387
- InChI: InChI=1S/C15H11F3N2O5S2/c1-2-26(21,22)12-4-3-7-19-13(12)14-20-10-8-9(5-6-11(10)25-14)27(23,24)15(16,17)18/h3-8H,2H2,1H3 Key: PTQBEFQWTBZMED-UHFFFAOYSA-N
- SMILES: CCS(=O)(=O)C1=C(N=CC=C1)C2=NC3=C(O2)C=CC(=C3)S(=O)(=O)C(F)(F)F

Properties
Chemical formula	C₁₅H₁₁F₃N₂O₅S₂
Molar mass	420

Hazards
- GHS labelling
Pictograms	(GHS09: Environmental hazard)
Signal word	Warning
Hazard statements	H410
Precautionary statements	P273, P391, P501
- Except where otherwise noted, data are given for materials in their standard state (at 25 °C [77 °F], 100 kPa). Infobox references

Oxazosulfyl is an insecticide that was developed by Sumitomo and introduced to the market in Japan in 2021 for use against insect pests on rice. The molecule has two different sulfonyl groups.

Oxazosulfyl works by inhibiting the vesicular acetylcholine transporter (VAChT) and was allocated to IRAC group 37. This inhibition results in rapid paralysis of the insect, which onsets a few minutes after application, and lasts for several days.

Oxazosulfyl is the first and until now only insecticide in the IRAC group 37. The class has not been given a name by IRAC, but Sumitomo propose the name "sulfyl" for the class.

Oxazosulfyl is used mainly in rice seed boxes. It controls a broad spectrum of rice pests in the orders of hemiptera, lepidoptera, and coleoptera. Some of the target insects are the brown planthopper (Nilaparvata lugens), the white-backed planthopper (Sogatella furcifera), the small brown planthopper (Laodelphax striatellus) and the rice leaf beetle (Oulema oryzae).
