= Quinalphos =

Names
- Preferred IUPAC name O,O-Diethyl O-(quinoxalin-2-yl) phosphorothioate
- Other names O,O-diethyl O-quinoxalin-2-yl phosphorothioate; Diethquinalphion; Diethquinalphione

Identifiers
| CAS Number | 13593-03-8 |
| 3D model (JSmol) | Interactive image; Interactive image |
| ChemSpider | 24335 |
| ECHA InfoCard | 100.033.650 |
| PubChem CID | 26124 |
| UNII | 26S837727Y |
| CompTox Dashboard (EPA) | DTXSID7024291 |
- InChI: InChI=1S/C12H15N2O3PS/c1-3-15-18(19,16-4-2)17-12-9-13-10-7-5-6-8-11(10)14-12/h5-9H,3-4H2,1-2H3 Key: JYQUHIFYBATCCY-UHFFFAOYSA-N; InChI=1/C12H15N2O3PS/c1-3-15-18(19,16-4-2)17-12-9-13-10-7-5-6-8-11(10)14-12/h5-9H,3-4H2,1-2H3 Key: JYQUHIFYBATCCY-UHFFFAOYAW
- SMILES: CCOP(=S)(OCC)OC1=NC2=CC=CC=C2N=C1; S=P(OCC)(OCC)Oc1nc2ccccc2nc1

Properties
| Chemical formula | C_{12}H_{15}N_{2}O_{3}PS |
| Molar mass | 298.30 g·mol^{−1} |
| Appearance | Reddish-brown liquid |
| Melting point | 31 °C (88 °F; 304 K) |
| Solubility in water | 17.8 mg/L at 22 °C |
- Except where otherwise noted, data are given for materials in their standard state (at 25 °C [77 °F], 100 kPa). Infobox references

Quinalphos is an organothiophosphate chemical chiefly used as a pesticide. It is a reddish-brown liquid. The chemical formula is C_{12}H_{15}N_{2}O_{3}PS, and IUPAC name O,O-diethyl O-quinoxalin-2-yl phosphorothioate. Ranked 'moderately hazardous' in World Health Organization's (WHO) acute hazard ranking, use of quinalphos, classified as a yellow label (highly toxic) pesticide in India, is widely used in the following crops: wheat, rice, coffee, sugarcane, and cotton.
