= Kadethrin =

Names
- Preferred IUPAC name (5-Benzylfuran-3-yl)methyl (1R,3S)-2,2-dimethyl-3-[(E)-(2-oxothiolan-3-ylidene)methyl]cyclopropane-1-carboxylate

Identifiers
CAS Number	58769-20-3
3D model (JSmol)	Interactive image
Beilstein Reference	1605066
ChEBI	CHEBI:39392
ChemSpider	20142266
ECHA InfoCard	100.055.830
EC Number	261-433-0
PubChem CID	12940701
RTECS number	GZ1266550
UNII	N52O84U83Z
CompTox Dashboard (EPA)	DTXSID5042083
- InChI: InChI=1S/C23H24O4S/c1-23(2)19(12-17-8-9-28-22(17)25)20(23)21(24)27-14-16-11-18(26-13-16)10-15-6-4-3-5-7-15/h3-7,11-13,19-20H,8-10,14H2,1-2H3/b17-12+/t19-,20-/m0/s1 Key: UGWALRUNBSBTGI-ZKMZRDRYSA-N; InChI=1/C23H24O4S/c1-23(2)19(12-17-8-9-28-22(17)25)20(23)21(24)27-14-16-11-18(26-13-16)10-15-6-4-3-5-7-15/h3-7,11-13,19-20H,8-10,14H2,1-2H3/b17-12+/t19-,20-/m0/s1 Key: UGWALRUNBSBTGI-ZKMZRDRYBN
- SMILES: O=C(OCc2cc(Cc1ccccc1)oc2)[C@@H]4[C@H](\C=C3/CCSC3=O)C4(C)C

Properties
Chemical formula	C_{23}H_{24}O_{4}S
Molar mass	396.50 g·mol^{−1}

Hazards
- GHS labelling
Pictograms	(GHS07: Exclamation mark) (GHS09: Environmental hazard)
Signal word	Warning
Hazard statements	H302, H312, H332, H410
Precautionary statements	P261, P264, P270, P271, P273, P280, P301+P312, P302+P352, P304+P312, P304+P340, P312, P322, P330, P363, P391, P501
Flash point	100 °C (212 °F; 373 K)
- Except where otherwise noted, data are given for materials in their standard state (at 25 °C [77 °F], 100 kPa). verify (what is ?) Infobox references

Kadethrin is a synthetic pyrethroid with the chemical formula C_{23}H_{24}O_{4}S which is used as an insecticide. It is the most potent knockdown pyrethroid (even stronger than pyrethrin II) but it is relatively unstable, especially when exposed to light (due to both the furan ring and the thiolactone group in the molecule).
