= Tefluthrin =

Synthetic pyrethroid used as insecticide

- tefluthrin (racemic)

Names
- Preferred IUPAC name rac-(2,3,5,6-Tetrafluoro-4-methylphenyl)methyl (1R,3R)-2,2-dimethyl-3-[(1Z)-2-chloro-3,3,3-trifluoroprop-1-en-1-yl]cyclopropane-1-carboxylate
- Other names Tefluthrine

Identifiers
CAS Number	79538-32-2
3D model (JSmol)	Interactive image
ChEBI	CHEBI:9430
ChEMBL	ChEMBL1335810
ChemSpider	9709620
ECHA InfoCard	100.124.968
EC Number	616-699-6
KEGG	C10992
PubChem CID	5281874
UNII	2HE8P42H2J
CompTox Dashboard (EPA)	DTXSID101355738 DTXSID5032577, DTXSID101355738
- InChI: InChI=1S/C17H14ClF7O2/c1-6-11(19)13(21)7(14(22)12(6)20)5-27-15(26)10-8(16(10,2)3)4-9(18)17(23,24)25/h4,8,10H,5H2,1-3H3/b9-4-/t8-,10-/m1/s1 Key: ZFHGXWPMULPQSE-SZGBIDFHSA-N; InChI=1/C17H14ClF7O2/c1-6-11(19)13(21)7(14(22)12(6)20)5-27-15(26)10-8(16(10,2)3)4-9(18)17(23,24)25/h4,8,10H,5H2,1-3H3/b9-4-/t8-,10-/m1/s1 Key: ZFHGXWPMULPQSE-SZGBIDFHBO
- SMILES: CC1=C(C(=C(C(=C1F)F)COC(=O)[C@@H]2[C@@H](C2(C)C)/C=C(/C(F)(F)F)\Cl)F)F

Properties
Chemical formula	C_{17}H_{14}ClF_{7}O_{2}
Molar mass	418.74 g·mol^{−1}
Appearance	colorless solid
Density	1.48 g/mL
Melting point	44.6 °C
Boiling point	156 °C at 1 mmHg
Solubility in water	0.02 mg/L in water >500 g/L in acetone, hexane, toluene
log P	6.4

Hazards
- GHS labelling
Pictograms	(GHS06: Toxic) (GHS09: Environmental hazard)
Signal word	Danger
Hazard statements	H300, H310, H330, H410
Precautionary statements	P260, P262, P264, P270, P271, P273, P280, P284, P301+P310, P302+P350, P304+P340, P310, P320, P321, P330, P361, P363, P391, P403+P233, P405, P501
- Except where otherwise noted, data are given for materials in their standard state (at 25 °C [77 °F], 100 kPa). Infobox references

Tefluthrin is the ISO common name for an organic compound that is used as a pesticide. It is a pyrethroid, a class of synthetic insecticides that mimic the structure and properties of the naturally occurring insecticide pyrethrin which is present in the flowers of Chrysanthemum cinerariifolium. Pyrethroids such as tefluthrin are often preferred as active ingredients in agricultural insecticides because they are more cost-effective and longer acting than natural pyrethrins. It is effective against soil pests because it can move as a vapour without irreversibly binding to soil particles: in this respect it differs from most other pyrethroids.

== Synthesis ==

Tefluthrin (X=CH_{3}) is manufactured by the esterification of cyhalothrin acid chloride with 4-methyl-2,3,5,6-tetrafluorobenzyl alcohol. The latter was a novel compound when tefluthrin was invented and the choice of routes to it has been discussed.

== History ==
By 1974, a team of Rothamsted Research scientists had discovered three pyrethroids suitable for use in agriculture, namely permethrin, cypermethrin and deltamethrin. These compounds were subsequently licensed by the NRDC, as NRDC 143, 149 and 161 respectively, to companies which could then develop them for sale in defined territories. Imperial Chemical Industries (ICI) obtained licenses to permethrin and cypermethrin but their agreement with the NRDC did not allow worldwide sales. Also, it was clear to ICI's own researchers at Jealott's Hill that future competition in the marketplace might be difficult owing to the greater potency of deltamethrin compared to the other compounds. For that reason, chemists there sought patentable analogues which might have advantages compared to the Rothamsted insecticides by having wider spectrum or greater cost-benefit. The first breakthrough was made when a trifluoromethyl group was used to replace one of the chlorines in cypermethrin, especially when the double bond was in its Z form. The second relied on a process chemists developed to practically manufacture the Z-cis acid by controlling the stereochemistry of the cyclopropane ring in addition to that of the double bond. This led to the commercialisation of cyhalothrin and made available a relatively large supply of the acid. Exploratory studies continued in which it was combined with a large number of commercially available benzyl alcohols. In the main, these had little or no biological activity but when penta-fluorobenzyl alcohol was used the ester with X=F not only had substantial intrinsic activity on Diabrotica balteata but continued to be effective when soil was present, in contrast to other known pyrethroids. Further research allowed the analogue with X=CH_{3} (i.e. what became tefluthrin) to be identified after field trials as the optimum for development under the ICI code number PP993. It was first marketed in 1987 using the trademark Force. In 2000, the agrochemical business of ICI merged with that of Novartis to form Syngenta, which still manufactures and supplies tefluthrin. The US patent covering the parent compound expired in November 2002. Tefluthrin was registered for sale in the European Union until December 5, 2008, when it was added to a group of pesticides whose authorization was withdrawn and it could no longer be sold. However, on January 1, 2012, it was re-approved for use.

== Mechanism of action ==
Pyrethroid insecticides, including tefluthrin, disrupt the functioning of the nervous system in an organism. They are fast-acting axonic excitotoxins, which affect the voltage-gated sodium channels. The sodium channels are heteromultimeric complexes consisting of one large 𝛼-subunit and two smaller 𝛽-subunits. The binding site of tefluthrin is on the 𝛼-subunit, which also forms the pore of the channel. It alters the functioning of the channel by blocking the inactivation and slowing the deactivation. This results in persistent and prolonged activation of sodium channels and inflow of sodium, which is lethal to the insect. There are many different forms of sodium channels: in mammals, nine different sodium channel 𝛼-subunits have been identified (named Nav1.1-Nav1.9). The channel isoforms differ in affinity for tefluthrin; for example the Nav1.6 is at least 15-fold more sensitive than the Nav1.2 isoform.

== Formulations ==
Tefluthrin is made available to end-users only in formulated products. Its main use is for the control of soil-dwelling insects in maize when formulated as granules. It can also be incorporated in seed treatments.

== Usage ==
All pesticides are required to seek registration from appropriate authorities in the country in which they will be used. In the United States, the Environmental Protection Agency (EPA) is responsible for regulating pesticides under the Federal Insecticide, Fungicide, and Rodenticide Act (FIFRA) and the Food Quality Protection Act (FQPA). A pesticide can only be used legally according to the directions on the label that is included at the time of the sale of the pesticide. The purpose of the label is "to provide clear directions for effective product performance while minimizing risks to human health and the environment". A label is a legally binding document that mandates how the pesticide can and must be used and failure to follow the label as written when using the pesticide is a federal offense. The current (2020) label for tefluthrin in the USA covers its use on field corn, popcorn, seed corn and sweetcorn and specifies the amount to be applied. Within the European Union, a 2-tiered approach is used for the approval and authorisation of pesticides. Firstly, before a formulated product can be developed for market, the active substance must be approved for the European Union. After this has been achieved, authorisation for the specific product must be sought from every Member State that the applicant wants to sell it to. Afterwards, there is a monitoring programme to make sure the pesticide residues in food are below the limits set by the European Food Safety Authority.

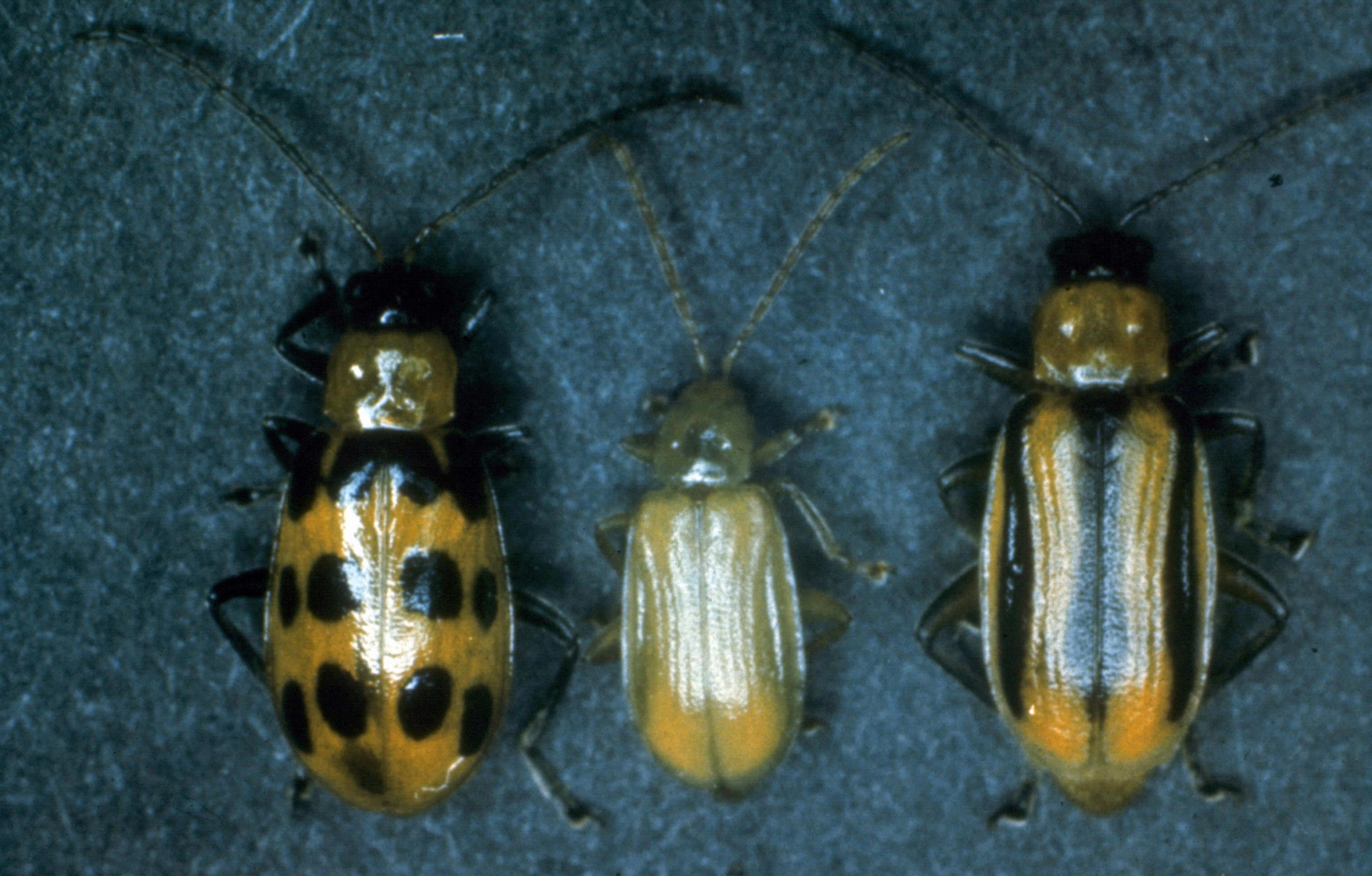
Adult stages of some Diabrotica pests controlled by tefluthrin

The main use of tefluthrin is to control the larvae of corn rootworms (Diabrotica spp) and it is also lethal to cutworm and wireworm larvae. Related insects share this susceptibility to the compound, including pests such as springtails, symphylids, millipedes, pygmy beetle, fire ants and white grubs. The advantage to the farmer comes in the form of improved yield at harvest. Farmers can act in their best economic interest: the value of the additional yield can be estimated and the total cost of using the insecticide informs the decision to purchase. This cost-benefit analysis by the end user sets a maximum price which the supplier can demand. The estimated annual use of tefluthrin in US agriculture is mapped by the US Geological Survey. This shows that use peaked in 2003 but by 2017, the latest date for which figures are available, has fallen to about 150,000 pounds (68,000 kg) annually, almost exclusively in the corn belt. The ability of tefluthrin to control soil pests, in contrast to other pyrethroids, is due to its relatively high volatility, which allows its vapour to move from the site of application to the surrounding soil. Its vapour pressure at 20 °C is 8.4 mPa while that of permethrin, for example, is 0.007 mPa.

== Human safety ==
Tefluthrin is a restricted use pesticide. One consequence of this is that, in the US, it is a violation of Federal law to use the product in a manner inconsistent with its labelling and the labelling must be in possession of the user at the time of the application. It can be absorbed into the body by inhalation of dust or mist and by ingestion. It causes moderate eye irritation. Prolonged or frequently repeated skin contact may cause allergic reactions in some individuals. Skin exposure may result in a transient sensation described as a tingling, itching, burning, or prickly feeling. Onset may occur immediately to four hours after exposure and may last 2–30 hours, without apparent skin damage. First aid measures are included with the label information.

=== Metabolism ===
The mammalian LD_{50} is 21.8 mg/kg (rats, oral). Phase I metabolism of tefluthrin proceeds via both oxidation and hydrolysis. Initial targets for oxidation are its methyl groups. Those on the cyclopropane ring and on the tetrafluorobenzene ring are oxidized to alcohol groups which can be further oxidized into carboxylic acids. Hydrolysis of tefluthrin occurs at the ester bond which results in cyhalothrin acid and 4-methyl-2,3,5,6-tetrafluorobenzyl alcohol, which can be further oxidized into the corresponding carboxylic acid. In phase II metabolism, the phase I metabolites are glucuronidated on any available alcohol groups to facilitate membrane transport and eventually excretion.

== Environmental effects ==
Tefluthrin is very highly toxic to freshwater and estuarine fish and invertebrates. Its properties and effects on the environment have been summarized in several publications. Ultimately it is the regulatory authorities in each country who must weigh up the benefits to end users and balance these against the compound's inherent hazards and consequent risks to consumers and the wider environment. These authorities stipulate the conditions under which tefluthrin may be used.

== Resistance management ==
Species have the ability to evolve and develop resistance to pyrethroids (and, indeed, almost all pesticides). This potential can be mitigated by careful management. Reports of individual pest species becoming resistant to tefluthrin are monitored by manufacturers, regulatory bodies such as the EPA and the Insecticide Resistance Action Committee (IRAC). In some cases, the risks of resistance developing can be reduced by using a mixture of two or more insecticides which each have activity on relevant pests but with unrelated mechanisms of action. IRAC assigns insecticides into classes so as to facilitate this.
