= Dimetilan =

Names
- Preferred IUPAC name 1-(Dimethylcarbamoyl)-5-methyl-1H-pyrazol-3-yl dimethylcarbamate

Identifiers
CAS Number	644-64-4
3D model (JSmol)	Interactive image
ChEMBL	ChEMBL3183014
ChemSpider	12052
ECHA InfoCard	100.010.383
EC Number	211-420-0
PubChem CID	12572
UNII	S53KQ82I35
UN number	2757
CompTox Dashboard (EPA)	DTXSID2041880
- InChI: InChI=1S/C10H16N4O3/c1-7-6-8(17-10(16)13(4)5)11-14(7)9(15)12(2)3/h6H,1-5H3 Key: RDBIYWSVMRVKSG-UHFFFAOYSA-N; InChI=1/C10H16N4O3/c1-7-6-8(17-10(16)13(4)5)11-14(7)9(15)12(2)3/h6H,1-5H3 Key: RDBIYWSVMRVKSG-UHFFFAOYAT
- SMILES: O=C(n1nc(OC(=O)N(C)C)cc1C)N(C)C

Properties
Chemical formula	C_{10}H_{16}N_{4}O_{3}
Molar mass	240.263 g·mol^{−1}

Hazards
- GHS labelling
Pictograms	(GHS06: Toxic) (GHS07: Exclamation mark) (GHS09: Environmental hazard)
Signal word	Danger
Hazard statements	H301, H312, H410
Precautionary statements	P264, P270, P273, P280, P301+P310, P302+P352, P312, P321, P322, P330, P363, P391, P405, P501
- Except where otherwise noted, data are given for materials in their standard state (at 25 °C [77 °F], 100 kPa). Infobox references

Dimetilan (chemical formula: C_{10}H_{16}N_{4}O_{3}) is a carbamate insecticide.
