= Prothiofos =

Names
- IUPAC name O-(2,4-Dichlorophenyl) O-ethyl S-propyl phosphorodithioate
- Other names: Tokuthion; Dichlorpropaphos; Bideron; Toyodan

Identifiers
CAS Number	34643-46-4
3D model (JSmol)	Interactive image
ChEBI	CHEBI:38873
ChEMBL	ChEMBL1560680
ChemSpider	33832
ECHA InfoCard	100.047.372
EC Number	252-125-7
KEGG	C18405
PubChem CID	36870
UNII	H5232196GP
CompTox Dashboard (EPA)	DTXSID8042349
- InChI: InChI=1S/C11H15Cl2O2PS2/c1-3-7-18-16(17,14-4-2)15-11-6-5-9(12)8-10(11)13/h5-6,8H,3-4,7H2,1-2H3 Key: FITIWKDOCAUBQD-UHFFFAOYSA-N
- SMILES: CCCSP(=S)(OCC)OC1=C(C=C(C=C1)Cl)Cl

Properties
Chemical formula	C_{11}H_{15}Cl_{2}O_{2}PS_{2}
Molar mass	345.23 g·mol^{−1}
Boiling point	166 °C
- Except where otherwise noted, data are given for materials in their standard state (at 25 °C [77 °F], 100 kPa). Infobox references

Prothiofos (from the Greek words for "sulfur-containing phosphorus compound") is an organophosphate insecticide, also known as Tokuthion.

Prothiofos was introduced in the 1970s and became a popular insecticide due to its effectiveness against chewing insects like mites and whitefly. However, it was phased out in the 2000s after rising concerns for its toxicity to humans and due to better alternatives entering the market.

Prothiofos is still used in some parts of Asia and Africa for pest control and the protection of agriculture.

== Reactivity ==
The molecule's P=S bond makes it reactive. The chlorine atoms on the aromatic ring make it stable and the C-O ester bonds make it easier to hydrolyze. Prothiofos can undergo many reactions due to its functional groups. It can react through nucleophilic substitution reactions with SN1 and SN2 mechanisms, for example with amines. It can also undergo electrophilic reactions, as the P=S bond makes it a soft nucleophile. Its dichlorophenyl group can be involved in an electrophilic aromatic substitution in the presence of Lewis acid or halogen exchange reactions.

== Synthesis ==
Synthesis of Prothiofos starts with synthesizing 2,4-dichlorophenol by chlorination of phenol with an organic solvent (e.g., DCM). By reacting phosphorus pentasulfide or thiophosphoryl chloride with ethanol, production of the precursor O,O-diethyl phosphorothioic chloride occurs and is the activated intermediate. For the last step towards production of Prothiofos an esterification reaction is needed where 2,4-dichlorophenol reacts with the activated phosphorus intermediate in the presence of a base (e.g., pyridine). This reaction also forms hydrochloric acid as a byproduct which can be neutralized in a next step or removed.

== Metabolism ==
Prothiofos is quickly absorbed and metabolised in rats. After 72 h of administration, 98% of the dose is excreted. Moreover, it is adsorbed in soil. The major metabolic pathways of prothiofos include oxidation, hydrolysis, conjugation and degradation which are Phase I reactions and conjugation like glucuronidation and sulfation which are Phase II reactions.

=== Biotransformation ===
The biotransformation process occurs mainly in the liver of mammals. In the oxidation step, cytochrome P450 oxidizes the P=S bond to form P=O which is highly toxic as it can inhibit acetylcholinesterase (AChE), an enzyme vital for nerve function. Then through hydrolysis, esterase enzymes like phosphatase break the P-O-C bond forming non-toxic metabolites. In addition, the metabolites formed undergo conjugation with glucuronic acid, sulfate or glutathione with UDP-glucuronosyltransferases (UGTs), sulfotransferase (SULT) or glutathione-S-transferase (GST) respectively. Glucuronidation and sulfation enhance the excretion via urine by increasing water solubility. Some of them may enter the bile and go into the intestine for further degradation.

=== Molecular mechanism of action ===
Prothiofos is an acetylcholinesterase inhibitor. Its mode of action is classified as 1B under the Insecticide Resistance Action Committee Mode of Action classification scheme. AChE is responsible for the hydrolysis of neurotransmitter acetylcholine, to acetate and chlorine. The inhibition of acetylcholine results in the increase of both level and duration of neurotransmitter action.

== Use ==
Prothiofos is a broad-spectrum insecticide and controls a variety of pests. Its application relies on the control of leaf-eating insects, such as weevil borers, caterpillars, thrips, and mealybugs, as well as worms, such as wireworms, cutworms, and termites. It is also effective against pests that have developed resistance to carbamate, organochlorines, and other organophosphorus insecticides. Additionally, it is proven to manage public health pests, such as houseflies and mosquitoes. Prothiofos is primarily applied as a foliar spray and can be used on fruit trees (bananas, grapes, pears), vegetables (crucifiers, corn, potatoes), sugarcane, beets, tea trees, tobacco, and flowers. The insecticide is less effective against cicadellids, mirids, and coccinellids.

=== Protection ===
The use of prothiofos is only recommended if no safer alternatives are applicable as part of the integrated pest management system. Exposure to prothiofos is toxic to both humans and the environment. Appropriate personal protective equipment (PPE) and respiratory protective equipment (RPE) must be worn to avoid direct exposure when handling. Thorough handwashing is also necessary after handling for prevention of oral exposure and ingestion. Furthermore, the work clothes must be washed separately to avoid contamination. Application of prothiofos to water is prohibited due to concerns of toxicity, persistence and bioaccumulation.

=== Regulation ===
Following European Commission regulation (EC) No 1107/2009, prothifos is not approved for use in the European Union as active substances for plant protection products.The compound is allowed only if it does not exceed the Maximum Residue Level (MRL) of 0.01 mg/kg . Additionally, there are a number of prothiofos suppliers in other countries and especially in the US and China.

== Dangers ==
Prothiofos has been proven to cause various adverse effects during animal studies. The predominant side effects, observed in rats and dogs, were the inhibition of cholinesterase (ChE) activity in the brain and erythrocyte, neurotoxicity, which can cause tremors, and suppressed body weight. However, there was no carcinogenicity, genotoxicity, or reproductive toxicity in rat studies. In the case of rabbits, there were cases of teratogenicity, since incidences of an open eyelid, bent ribs and femoral dysplasia of the fetus were observed. This was due to the intake of the compound by the mother rabbit. There were no signs of teratogenicity in rats. Other studies, showed that the parent compound prothiofos was identified as a relevant substance for residue definition for dietary risk assessment in agricultural products.

In the past, there were two cases of prothiofos poisoning. This caused delayed respiratory failure and eventual death of the patients, who were under required intubation.

== Toxicological data ==
The median lethal dose (LD50) of prothiofos for rats is determined to be 875 mg/kg (oral), 3900 mg/kg (dermal) and 271 mg/m3 (inhalation).

Different amounts of the lowest no-observed-adverse-effect level (NOAEL) were found across all studies. The NOAEL was 0.27 mg/kg body weight (bw) per day in a two-year study of chronic toxicity and carcinogenicity in rats, and 5 mg/kg bw/day in acute neurotoxicity study in rats. The Food Safety Commission in Japan (FSCJ) determined an acceptable daily intake (ADI) of 0.027 mg/kg body bw/ day and an acute reference dose (ARfD) of 0.05 mg/kg bw/day, by applying a safety factor of 100 to the NOAEL to both ADI and ARfD.
