= Fenitrothion =

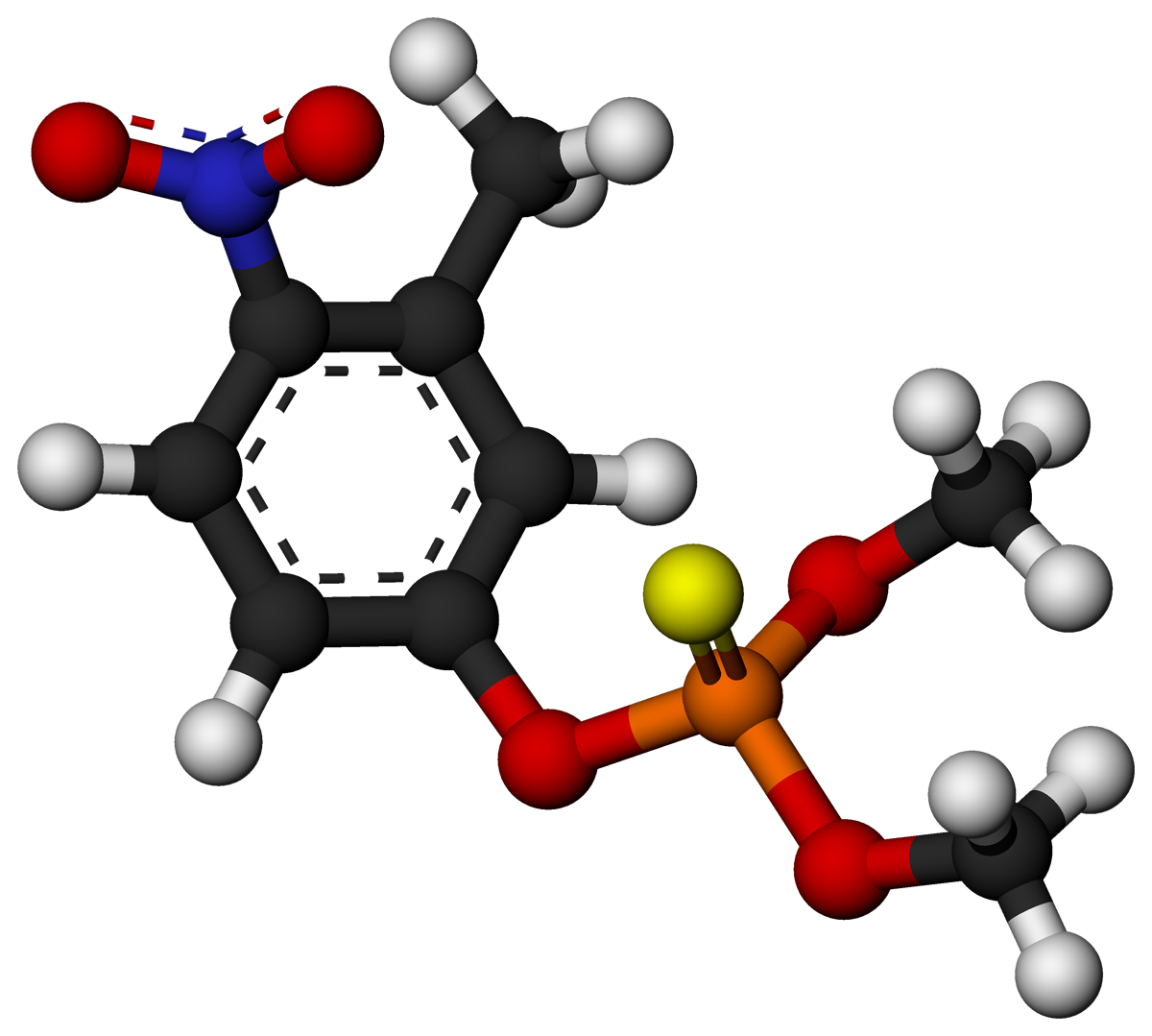

Names
- Preferred IUPAC name O,O-Dimethyl O-(3-methyl-4-nitrophenyl) phosphorothioate
- Other names • Dimethoxy-(3-methyl-4-nitrophenoxy)thioxophosphorane; O,O-Dimethyl O-4-nitro-m-tolyl phosphorothioate

Identifiers
CAS Number	122-14-5
3D model (JSmol)	Interactive image
ChEBI	CHEBI:34757
ChEMBL	ChEMBL347698
ChemSpider	28941
ECHA InfoCard	100.004.114
KEGG	C14442
PubChem CID	31200
UNII	W8M4X3Y7ZY
CompTox Dashboard (EPA)	DTXSID4032613
- InChI: InChI=1S/C9H12NO5PS/c1-7-6-8(4-5-9(7)10(11)12)15-16(17,13-2)14-3/h4-6H,1-3H3 Key: ZNOLGFHPUIJIMJ-UHFFFAOYSA-N; InChI=1/C9H12NO5PS/c1-7-6-8(4-5-9(7)10(11)12)15-16(17,13-2)14-3/h4-6H,1-3H3 Key: ZNOLGFHPUIJIMJ-UHFFFAOYAZ
- SMILES: S=P(Oc1cc(c(cc1)[N+]([O-])=O)C)(OC)OC

Properties
Chemical formula	C_{9}H_{12}NO_{5}PS
Molar mass	277.23 g·mol^{−1}
Appearance	Yellow-brown liquid
Density	1.3227 g/cm^{3}
Melting point	3.4 °C (38.1 °F; 276.5 K)
Boiling point	118 °C (244 °F; 391 K) at 0.05 mmHg
Solubility in water	38.0 mg/L
Solubility	Readily soluble in dichloromethane, 2-propanol, toluene, hardly soluble in n-hexane.
log P	3.30 (octanol/water)

Hazards
- Lethal dose or concentration (LD, LC)
LD_{50} (median dose)	Rat, oral: 500 mg/kg Mouse (female), oral: 1416 mg/kg
- Except where otherwise noted, data are given for materials in their standard state (at 25 °C [77 °F], 100 kPa). verify (what is ?) Infobox references

Fenitrothion (IUPAC name: O,O-dimethyl O-(3-methyl-4-nitrophenyl) phosphorothioate) is a phosphorothioate (organophosphate) insecticide that is inexpensive and widely used worldwide. Trade names include Sumithion, a 94.2% solution of fenitrothion.

== Health effects ==
Fenitrothion at sublethal doses affected the motor movement of marsupials, and at acute dose levels it reduced the energy of birds.

In chronic (low) dose tests, unexpectedly only the lowest concentration (0.011 microgram/liter) of fenitrothion depressed the growth of an algae, though all of the chronic dose levels used were toxic in other ways to the algae.

Just half of fenitrothion's minimally effective dose altered the thyroid structure of a freshwater murrel (the snakehead fish).

Cases of non-specific encephalopathy and fatty visceral changes (Reye's syndrome) in children living in the vicinity of fenitrothion-spraying operations invoked the research described latterly in Science, and originally in The Lancet:

2-day-old mice were dosed topically for 11 days with fenitrothion, amongst other substances. After a further 2 days a sublethal dose of encephalomyocarditis virus was injected subcutaneously in known titre. Mortality-rates in the 10-day period after virus injection 4-9% in fenitrothion groups, and 0% in corn-oil controls. Fatty changes were noted in liver and kidney in the insecticide-virus groups. The encephalopathy showed no specific central-nervous system lesion, but death followed a sequence of paralysis and convulsions. The possible role of exposure to combinations of insecticides in human viral susceptibility requires further attention.

Further study showed that the illness was caused not by fenitrothion itself, but combinations which included the surfactants and the solvent (with or without the pesticide) clearly showed that pretreatment with these chemicals markedly increased the viral lethality in the test mice.

== Resistance ==
In an unusual demonstration of resistance to pesticides, 8% of insects in farm fields were found to carry a symbiotic gut microbe that can metabolize and detoxify fenitrothion; after in-vitro tests showed that the microbe significantly increased the survival of fenitrothion-treated insects.
