= Phoxim =

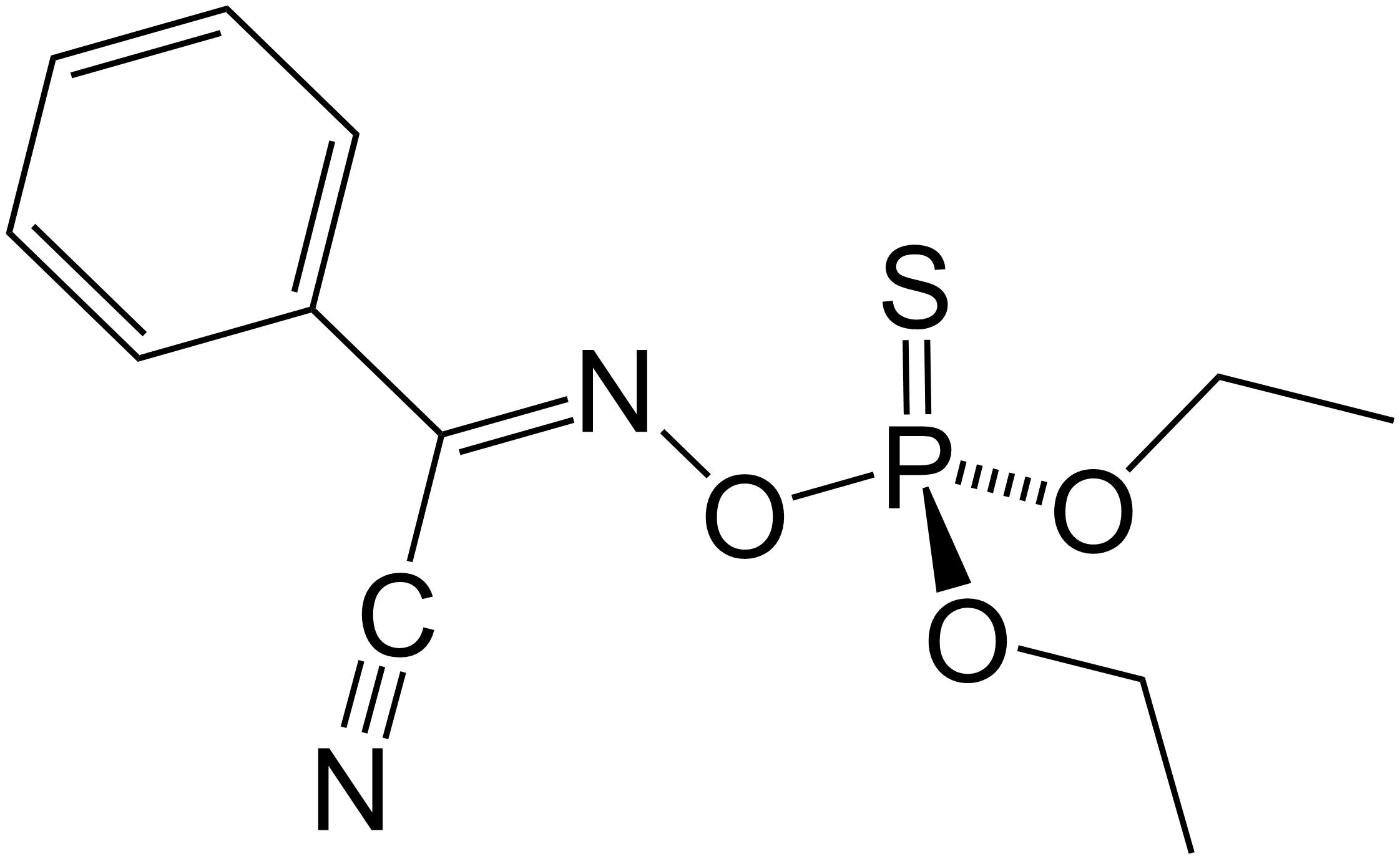

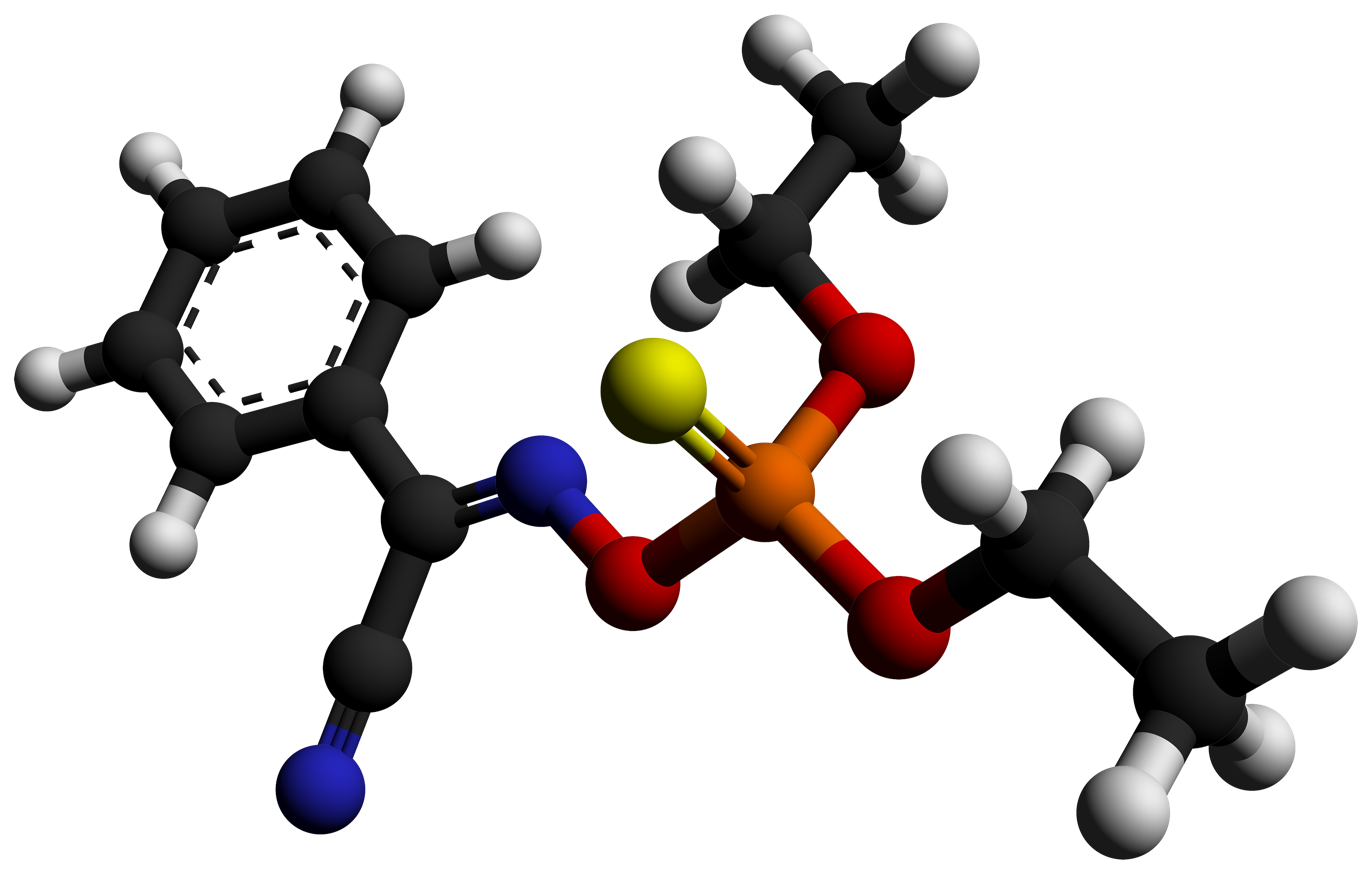

Names
- IUPAC name (E,Z)-N-[(Diethoxyphosphorothioyl)oxy]benzenecarboximidoyl cyanide
- Other names Baythion; Valexone; Phoxime; Sebacil; Valexon; Volaton

Identifiers
CAS Number	14816-18-3
3D model (JSmol)	Interactive image
ChemSpider	25076
ECHA InfoCard	100.035.337
EC Number	238-887-3
KEGG	D08373
MeSH	Phoxim
PubChem CID	9570290
UNII	6F5V775VPO
CompTox Dashboard (EPA)	DTXSID8034324
- InChI: InChI=1S/C12H15N2O3PS/c1-3-15-18(19,16-4-2)17-14-12(10-13)11-8-6-5-7-9-11/h5-9H,3-4H2,1-2H3 Key: ATROHALUCMTWTB-UHFFFAOYSA-N; InChI=1/C12H15N2O3PS/c1-3-15-18(19,16-4-2)17-14-12(10-13)11-8-6-5-7-9-11/h5-9H,3-4H2,1-2H3 Key: ATROHALUCMTWTB-UHFFFAOYAQ
- SMILES: CCOP(=S)(OCC)ON=C(C#N)C1=CC=CC=C1

Properties
Chemical formula	C_{12}H_{15}N_{2}O_{3}PS
Molar mass	298.30 g·mol^{−1}
Appearance	Brownish red liquid
Density	1.17 g/cm^{3}
Melting point	6.1 °C (43.0 °F; 279.2 K)
Boiling point	102
Solubility in water	7 ppm

Pharmacology
ATCvet code	QP53AE03 (WHO)

Hazards
- GHS labelling
Pictograms	(GHS07: Exclamation mark) (GHS08: Health hazard) (GHS09: Environmental hazard)
Signal word	Warning
Hazard statements	H302, H317, H361f, H410
Precautionary statements	P201, P202, P261, P264, P270, P272, P273, P280, P281, P301+P312, P302+P352, P308+P313, P321, P330, P333+P313, P363, P391, P405, P501
- Except where otherwise noted, data are given for materials in their standard state (at 25 °C [77 °F], 100 kPa). verify (what is ?) Infobox references

Phoxim is an organophosphate insecticide that is produced by the Bayer corporation. It is an analogous dimethyl ester and an organothiophosphate acaricide. It is allowed for use in limited applications in the European Union. It is banned for use on crops in the European Union since 22 December 2007.

It is used in veterinary medicine to treat ectoparasitic acarids.

This pesticide should be used with caution since some insects like Helicoverpa assulta become even more resistant when exposed.
