= Organothiophosphate =

Class of chemical compounds

Organothiophosphates or organophosphorothioates are a subclass of organophosphorus compounds and of thiophosphate compounds. They are the organic compounds that contain a phosphate group in which one or more oxygen atoms is substituted by sulfur. Many are used as pesticides, some have medical applications, and some are used as oil additives. They generally have the chemical formula (RO)_{3}PS, [(RO)_{2}P(S)O]^{−}, R(RO)_{2}PS, etc.

Selected organothiophosphates
Echothiophate used for treatment of glaucoma

Amifostine, which is used in cancer chemotherapy

Chlorpyrifos, a common insecticide

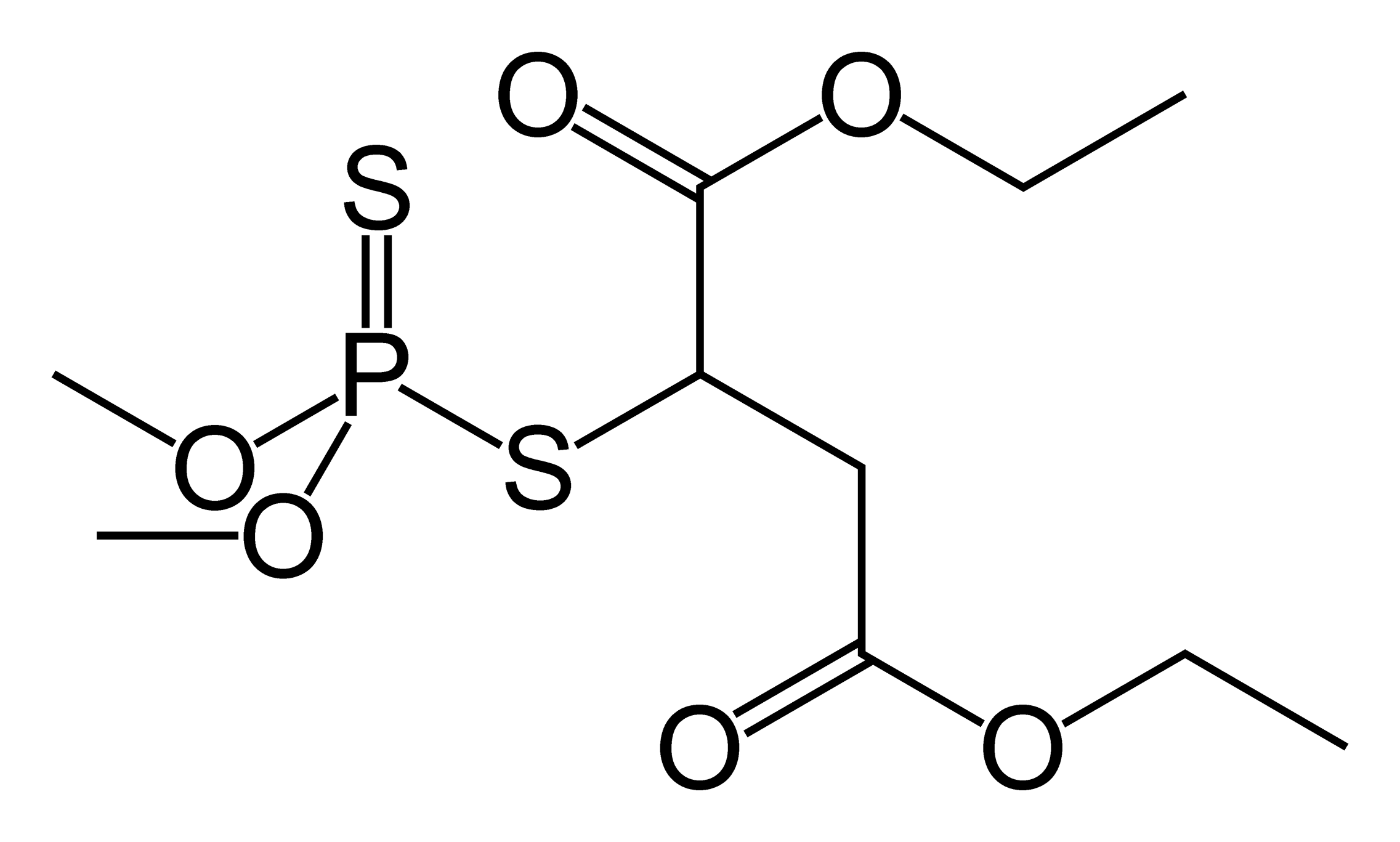
Malathion, a common insecticide

Phosphorothioates are the basis for antisense therapies

Oligonucleotide phosphorothioates (OPS) are modified oligonucleotides where one of the oxygen atoms in the phosphate moiety is replaced by sulfur. These compounds are the basis of antisense therapy, e.g., the drugs fomivirsen (Vitravene), oblimersen, alicaforsen, and mipomersen (Kynamro).

Further examples of these include:

- Diazinon
- Fenitrothion
- Fenthion
- Thiotepa

Variants with P=S double bonds were developed as insecticides because of their reduced mammalian toxicity. The phosphorothioate P=S bond is converted to the toxic P=O bond in the target insect. Similar oxidative conversion in mammals is slower, conferring lower toxicity in mammals.

== Structure, synthesis, and reactions ==
Generally these compounds feature tetrahedral phosphorus(V) centers. Classically, thiophosphates would include a P^{+}-S^{−} dative bond as illustrated by malathion. The terminology is used loosely and thiophosphates include P-S single bonds as illustrated by the drug amifostine.

Dithiophosphonic anhydrides commonly form four-membered rings. They react with dienes in a hetero-Diels-Alder reaction.

P–S single bonds can be generated through a variety of approaches, starting from thiols, disulfides, sulfinic acids as sulfur sources and various P(III) and P(V) coupling partners. PS–C bonds can also be formed through many comparable approaches, usually by alkylating a free phosphorus-thioate anion or thioic acid.

Organothiophosphates are conceptually derived from the inorganic thiophosphates (PO_{4−x}S^{3−}_{x}). In fact, many are prepared via diorganodithiophosphoric acid intermediates, which are prepared by treating phosphorus pentasulfide with alcohols:

P_{2}S_{5} + 4 ROH → 2 (RO)_{2}PS_{2}H + H_{2}S

Dimethyl dithiophosphoric acid and diethyl dithiophosphoric acid are obtained in this way. The former is a precursor to malathion.

In the Michalski reaction, a thiophosphate reacts with chlorine gas to give a diorganylphosphorylsulfenyl chloride:

(RO)_{3}PS + Cl_{2} → (RO)_{2}P(O)SCl + RCl
