= No nit policy =

Public health policy

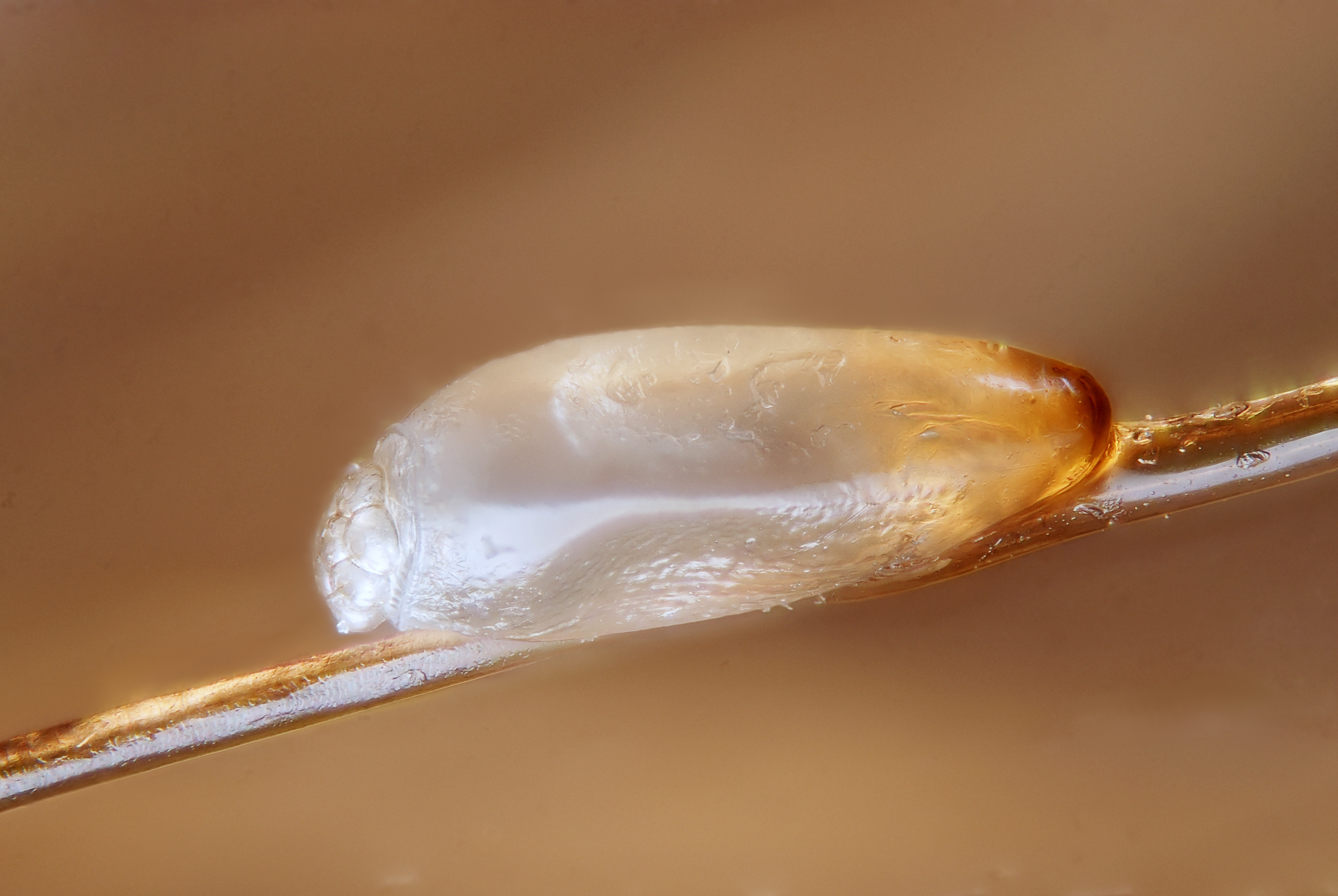
A dead nit attached to a hair

No nit policy is a public health policy implemented by some education authorities to prevent the transmission of head lice infestation. The "no nit" policy requires the sending home and barring of all children who have nits (egg shells) on their hair from controlled settings such as school, summer camp or day care facilities. The CDC, American Academy of Pediatrics (AAP) and the National Association of School Nurses (NASN) advocate that "no-nit" policies should be discontinued, in part because nits, the eggs or empty egg shells, are not transmissible and the burden of unnecessary absenteeism to the students, families and communities far outweighs the risks associated with head lice. Proponents of the no-nit policy counter that only a consistently nit-free child can be reliably shown to be infestation-free. That is, the presence of nits serves as a proxy for infestation status. Proponents argue that such a proxy is necessary because lice screening is prone to false negative conclusions (i.e., failure to find lice present on actively infested children).

== Nits ==
A nit is the egg of a louse. They are white, resembling dandruff, and 0.8 mm long. They cement to the hair base where they are difficult to remove, and may survive for three weeks away from the host. In British and Irish slang the term "nit" commonly refers to a head louse.

Only the presence of live crawling lice (nymph or imago) constitutes an infestation. Much of the controversy surrounding school head lice policy centers on the question of what to do with children discovered to have nits, but no visible lice. Indeed, one-third to three-fourths of children with nits fall into this category. The nits-only population therefore represents a significant fraction of children potentially subject to school exclusion and/or treatment with insecticides. Such children have evidence of infestation (i.e., the nits), but the infestation may be extinct.

Unfortunately, false negative conclusions (i.e., failing to find lice that are, in fact, present) regarding infestation have long been recognized as a problem in head lice diagnosis. Depending on the methods used, live lice can be easily missed during inspection. For example, a 1998 Israeli study found that 76% of live lice infestations were missed by visual inspection (as verified by subsequent combing methods). Although lice cannot fly or jump, they are fast and agile in their native environment (i.e., clinging to hairs near the warmth of the scalp), and will try to avoid the light used during inspection. Lice populations are also sparse, which can contribute to difficulty in finding live specimens. Two-thirds of infestations are composed of 10 or fewer individual lice. Further, lice populations consist predominantly (80%-90%) of immature nymphs, which are even smaller and harder to detect than adult lice.

These difficulties have, at times, led to the recommendation that the presence of nits alone be used to infer infestation:

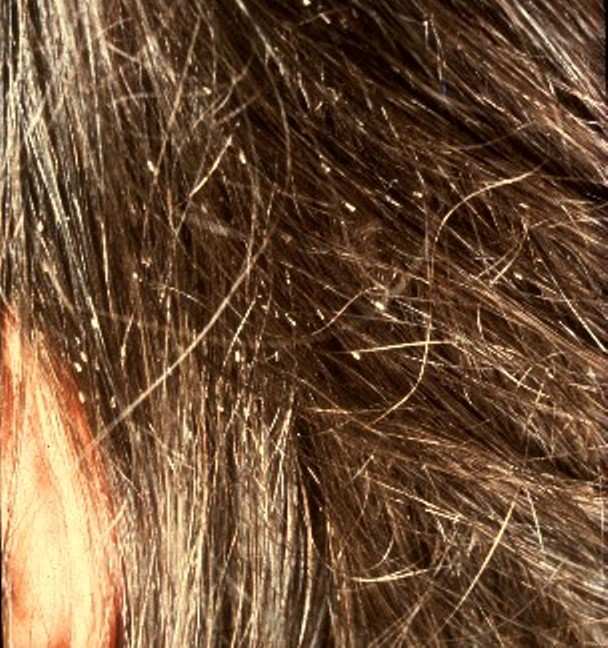
Head louse nits on human hair

When nymphs or adults are not observed, the presence of nits is diagnostic.

— U.S. Centers for Disease Control, 1984

A 1998 American study attempted to clarify the infestation risk associated with a "nits-only" diagnosis. They found that 18% of children with nits (but no apparent lice) became infested (i.e., lice appeared) 14 days later. Whether these new lice came from viable eggs or via transmission from other hosts was not clear. Transmission from other hosts would tend to overestimate the infestation risk associated with nits. In addition, some children were treated with pediculicides during this 14-day period. Successful treatments (i.e., killing eggs or recently hatched nymphs) tend to underestimate the infestation risk associated with nits. These limitations of the study notwithstanding, the authors concluded:

Most children with nits alone will not become infested; therefore, excluding these children from school and requiring them to be treated with a pediculicide is probably excessive.

— L. Keoki Williams and others (2001)

Although "nits-only" children are unlikely to become infested, this is not to say that a nit-free population is without value. Much of the difficulty in accurately diagnosing head lice stems from the possibility that observed nits are due to an extinct infestation. However, if a policy of required nit removal is enforced, this is no longer an issue. Against a background of nit-free children, spotting new infestations through routine screening becomes as easy as spotting the nits. This ease in screening comes at a price, though, namely the effort expended (typically by parents) in removing nits. And to the extent that no-nit policies result in absenteeism, the child's education suffers, and the school's funding (e.g., from government sources) may be reduced.

== Inspection ==
A 1991 survey of American nurses reported that 27% have regular inspection programs in place at their schools. 85% reported inspection on an "as-needed" basis. Routine inspection of children is advocated by a variety of nurses, researchers, organizations, and governments.

Head lice cannot live more than a day or two away from a host. Any remaining eggs will hatch in one to two weeks, and absent a host, the emerging nymphs will die within hours. Thus, simply leaving the school vacant for a week or two is sufficient to disinfect all fomite sources of head louse infection. The return of children to this now-clean environment is an ideal time to check for infestations and attempt to keep the environment lice-free. The California Department of Public Health encourages inspections to be performed on Fridays.

Some health researchers oppose regular inspections. This opposition to school inspections coincides with opposition to no-nit policies, and is based on similar reasoning (i.e., that they are ineffective).

Head lice screening programs have not had a significant effect on the incidence of head lice in the school setting over time and have not proven to be cost-effective.

— National Association of School Nurses (2004)

Lice infestation is not a reportable disease, so data on head lice incidence are sparse. As of 2008, no control-matched study exists on the effect of school screening programs on head lice prevalence. Further, although some authors note a stubborn prevalence of head lice during the latter half of the 20th century, this has occurred in an environment of rather lax screening efforts. For example, a 1991 survey of American nurses reported that only 27% had regular screening programs in place at their schools. Anecdotal evidence suggests that school screening programs can reduce head lice prevalence. Certainly, the effectiveness of these programs must be determined before their cost effectiveness can be evaluated.

Barbara Frankowski, a critic of school screenings, argues that time spent screening children by school nurses is better spent on other tasks. This attitude reflects those held by some American school nurses themselves, 27% of whom believe that eliminating lice infestations is not an important role of school nursing. Even more telling, only 11% of American school nurses find treating head lice to be professionally gratifying. Similar attitudes exist among Canadian school nurses.

No child should be allowed to miss valuable school time because of head lice.

— American Academy of Pediatrics, 2002

School inspections are often short—about one minute per child. Frankowski argues that such inspections are not thorough enough to be accurate, and so may lead to a false sense of security. Indeed, a 1998 study of Israeli children found that live lice took an average of 57 – 116 seconds to detect depending on the technique used. L. Keoki Williams and others acknowledge this shortcoming of school screening, and suggest that children found to have nits undergo an additional 5- to 10-minute examination to exclude the presence of live lice. In contrast, the American Academy of Pediatrics (AAP) argues not for increased inspection time, but elimination of the school screenings altogether, with parents being educated and encouraged to inspect their own children at home. This attitude, coupled with the AAP's opposition to the no-nit policy, would essentially absolve school administrators of responsibility to directly manage pediculosis in their student body.

== Discovery of infested students ==
=== Immediate exclusion from school ===
Discovery of infested students typically occurs during a school day. Assuming the presence of live lice is the criteria used to infer infestation, an ethical dilemma is presented to school nurses and administrators. Should this student, now known to be infectious, be returned to class where transmission to other students could occur? Or alternatively, should the student be immediately removed from the group setting? Schools have very limited capacity to individually supervise students outside of the classroom, so removal from the classroom means requesting that the child's parents pick up their child.

Parents often become upset when the school nurse telephones their place of employment to inform them of their child's infestation and to request they come and collect their child. Nonetheless, immediate exclusion policies are explicitly advocated by some nurses. A 1998 survey revealed that almost all (96%) American school nurses send home infested students upon discovery.

Opponents to immediate exclusion policies point out that the discovery of infestation is merely recognition of what has been an infectious condition for a number of months. Given that context, they argue, one more day of group contact is unlikely to result in more transmission than has already occurred. This contrasts with more short-term and highly communicable viral diseases such as chickenpox, influenza, or measles where immediate exclusion might reasonably reduce disease spread within the school.

The value of immediate exclusion for lice depends to some extent on the frequency of asymptomatic screening at the school. More frequent screening would tend to decrease the average time between infestation and discovery of that infestation. This would make the one day associated with immediate exclusion a more significant fraction of the total time the student was infectious. But even ardent supporters of asymptomatic screening do not advocate screenings more than once every three months. This suggests that the effect of immediate exclusion might be an exposure time reduction of as little as 1.6%, even under strict screening guidelines.

These changing attitudes on immediate exclusion appear to be affecting public policy. For example, in Australia, the National Health and Medical Research Council states that infested children need not be sent home upon discovery. Similarly, the California Department of Public Health advocates a head lice policy that does not immediately exclude infested children.

=== Communicability in school settings ===
Evaluating immediate exclusion policies is difficult, because as of 2008 the communicability of head lice in school settings has not been carefully studied. This has not, however, prevented authors from confidently asserting their opinion:

In some areas... crowded conditions at home may predispose persons to head lice. Nevertheless, evidence indicates that most transmission actually occurs at school.

— Norman G. Gratz, 1997

Lice transmission in schools is rare because close head-to-head contact would have to occur and this generally does not happen in the school setting.

— Patricia Sciscione and Cheryl A. Krause-Parello, 2007

Two studies have noted clustering of head louse infestation by classroom. However, the authors differ in their interpretation of this clustering. In 1997, Richard Speare and Petra Buettner noted prevalence ranges of 0% to 72.2% across classrooms in the same grade (3rd) and in the same Australian school. This led them to favor the idea that "opportunities for transmission are prominent within the classroom". Indeed, their data suggest that classrooms synchronize in terms of infestation status.

In contrast, Janis Hootman suggests that school communicability is low. In 1998 she found that infestations within American classrooms were restricted to a minority of chronically infested students. Hootman concluded that the infested students have access to an infectious source that their classmates do not. Similarly, she found that clusters of pediculosis within classrooms were associated with social interactions outside school (e.g., sleepovers). This indicates that transmission can occur between classmates, but again, these transmission events may be occurring away from school grounds.

== Barring return to school ==
After identifying and isolating an infested student, school policy typically requires some sort of verification that the student is no longer infectious before being readmitted to the school. Typically, this involves inspecting the child for evidence of continued infestation (see Criteria to infer infestation above). Schools commonly enforce either a "no-nit" policy or a "no-lice" policy.

=== The no-nit policy ===
The consensus has been changed more recently and the ""no-nit" policy is considered worse than the nits themselves to a child's education and family burden the missed days cause. The EPA, CDC, and NASN all agree "no-nit" policies should be done away with and that students should remain in school the entire day. even if lice is found, and parents should be notified so they can treat it at home. No-nit policies bar readmission of students found to have lice, eggs, or nits. This policy is popular with health authorities in the United States, Canada, and Australia. A 1998 survey revealed that a majority (61%) of American school nurses prevent return of treated students to school if they are not (also) nit-free. A similar percentage (60%) felt that "forced absenteeism of any child who has any nits in their hair is a good idea." Data from a primarily American study during 1998–1999 revealed even higher prevalence—no-nit policies were present at 82% of the schools attended by children suspected of louse infestation.

James H. Price and colleagues estimate that infested students lose two to four days of school for treatment and nit removal. Based on their 1998 survey of American school nurses, they estimate that approximately 6 million U.S. children lose 12 to 24 million child-schooldays annually due to lice infestation under no-nit policies.

==== Controversy surrounding no-nit policy ====
The no-nit policies may appeal to laypersons, and it is difficult to explain why they are not effective, particularly when some consumer organizations strongly support them. Nevertheless, there is no scientific basis to confirm the effectiveness of such programs...

— Barbara L. Frankowski (2004)

Although the no-nit policy has the appearance of a simple and popular tool against pediculosis transmission, its implementation has been opposed by a number of health researchers and organizations. Opponents argue that enforcement of no-nit policies has not significantly reduced head lice incidence in school settings, and that the risks and disadvantages of the no-nit policies outweigh their associated benefits.

As is the case in assessing school screening efforts (see Screening above), assessing the effectiveness of no-nit policies is complicated by the sparseness of head lice prevalence data. To the extent that no-nit policies increase the efficiency of school screening programs (see Benefits of nit-free population above), no-nit policies may lead to more rapid containment of head lice outbreaks. However, as of 2008, the correlation between no-nit policies and head lice incidence has not been examined.

The no nit policy involves a number of issues, such as the circumstances under which children will be inspected, the criteria to infer infestation, the procedures for dealing with infested children upon discovery, and the criteria to permit previously infested children to return to school. These issues are controversial. In particular, a number of health researchers and organizations object to the required removal of nits. Opponents to the no-nit policy point out that nits, being empty eggshells, have no clinical importance. Time-consuming nit removal, therefore, has no direct effect on transmission. This has led to the perception that the no-nit policy serves only to ease the workload of school nurses. Proponents of the no-nit policy counter that only a consistently nit-free child can be reliably shown to be infestation-free. That is, the presence of nits serves as a proxy for infestation status. Proponents argue that such a proxy is necessary because lice screening is prone to false negative conclusions (i.e., failure to find lice present on actively infested children). For example, a 1998 Israeli study found that 76% of live lice infestations were missed by visual inspection (as verified by subsequent combing methods). Although lice cannot fly or jump, they are fast and agile in their native environment (i.e., clinging to hairs near the warmth of the scalp), and will try to avoid the light used during inspection. Louse colonies are also sparse (often fewer than 10 lice), which can contribute to difficulty in finding live specimens. Further, lice populations consist predominantly of immature nymphs, which are even smaller and harder to detect than adult lice.

Contributing to the controversial nature of school head lice policies is a lack of available data on their importance and efficacy. For example, as of 2008, the transmissibility of head lice in school settings is largely unknown. Further, control-matched studies of the effect of specific school policies on head lice incidence are also lacking.

Schools in developed countries such as the United States, Canada, and Australia commonly exclude infested students, and prevent return of those students until all lice, eggs, and nits are removed. Policies in the United Kingdom extend to legal action against parents of infested students although the NHS does not recommend exclusion from school. Attitudes in developing countries are often quite different. Many societies consider head louse infestation to be normal, if even remarked upon at all.

==== Inherent conflict over no-nit policy ====
Kosta Y. Mumcuoglu and colleagues indict required nit removal policies as an attempt to minimize the effort expended by school nurses on differentiating active and extinct infestations. They further argue that this minimization comes at the expense of excessive efforts on the part of parents to remove signs of previous infestations (i.e., the nits), which have no clinical importance.

The difficulty parents face in advocating more lax attitudes towards children with nits, is that the parents have no concomitant guarantee from school administrators that those admitted children will truly be lice-free. Indeed, admitting children with nits increases the difficulty in identifying actively infested students (see Criteria to infer infestation above). In contrast to diseases such as measles or influenza, pediculosis does not inherently prevent school attendance. The financial incentive for schools, therefore, is to minimize expenditures on lice control and screening programs because (absent a no-nit policy) they have little effect on attendance. This is a formula for maximizing lice infestation within the student body, not minimizing it. Thus, while the no-nit policy may be seen as off-loading school nurse responsibilities to parents, it is perhaps more correctly viewed as imposing parental priorities on school administrators.

In the absence of such policies, school and parental priorities with respect to lice are inherently at odds. The parents wish to minimize lice transmission. In contrast, schools wish to maximize attendance, which is largely unaffected by lice transmission. Barring return of children until nits are removed has the effect of transforming the pediculosis "problem" for which schools have no inherent incentive to solve, into an attendance "problem" for which schools have a direct financial interest. Unfortunately, the solution advocated by many to this attendance "problem" is to simply remove the no-nit policy, leaving the inherent conflict between parents and school administrators unaddressed.

=== The no-lice policy ===
The no-lice policy bars readmission of students with crawling lice, but are indifferent to the presence of eggs and nits. These policies are advocated by a number of government agencies, but as of 2008, no data on the overall prevalence of no-lice policies exists. In Australia, the National Health and Medical Research Council states that treated children can return with nits so long as they are lice-free. Similarly, the California Department of Public Health advocates a policy that permits students to return to school with nits Although this has not stopped the Beverly Hills school district from reintroducing a no-nit policy.

== History ==
In 1902, Lina Struthers was appointed on an experimental basis, as a member of the relatively recently recognized profession of professional nurses. Pioneers of the profession became the first public health policy and health communication experts, serving to promote public understanding of disease prevention, which became critical after a smallpox outbreak in New York City caused widespread public panic and school absenteeism. Within one month Struthers had reduced absenteeism by a factor of 10.

Struthers recommended the best treatments of her time for head lice, which included kerosene and "precipitating ointment," a mercury salt. Reminding the reader that these treatments weren't very reliable, she advocated shaving the head or, in the case of older girls with long hair who would generally refuse this, manually removing the nits as a second-line treatment.

Lindane was approved in 1981 for the treatment of head lice. There were significant health risks associated with the drug; however, it remains an effective second-line treatment. The Over-the-Counter approval of Nix Permethrin 1% topical lotion in 1990 and subsequent marketing approval in 1996 for prophylaxis provided a new way to combat lice. Resistance has occurred with these treatments that may necessitate protracted courses of treatment with multiple drugs.
