= Hair Fairies =

American hair salon chain

- Industry: Health
- Founded: 1999
- Founder: Maria Botham
- Headquarters: Los Angeles, United States
- Website: www.hairfairies.com/

Hair Fairies is a chain of clinical salons dedicated to the removal of head lice. Headquartered in Los Angeles, California, the company operates stores in Los Angeles, San Francisco, San Diego, New York City, Fairfield, Burlingame, Seattle, Portland, Dallas, Chicago, and Atlanta. Hair Fairies products contain ingredients such as rosemary, aloe vera, lavender, and peppermint oil. The company was founded in 1999 by Maria Botham, who currently serves as its president.
