= Nitpicking (disambiguation) =

Nitpicking may refer to:

Nitpicking is the action of giving too much attention to unimportant detail.

Nitpicking may also refer to:

- Nitpick (Isabelle), a tool of the Isabelle proof assistant
- A form of hypercriticism, thus a pathologic or pejorative term for finding errors
- Nitpicker, an enemy in the NES game Ice Climber
