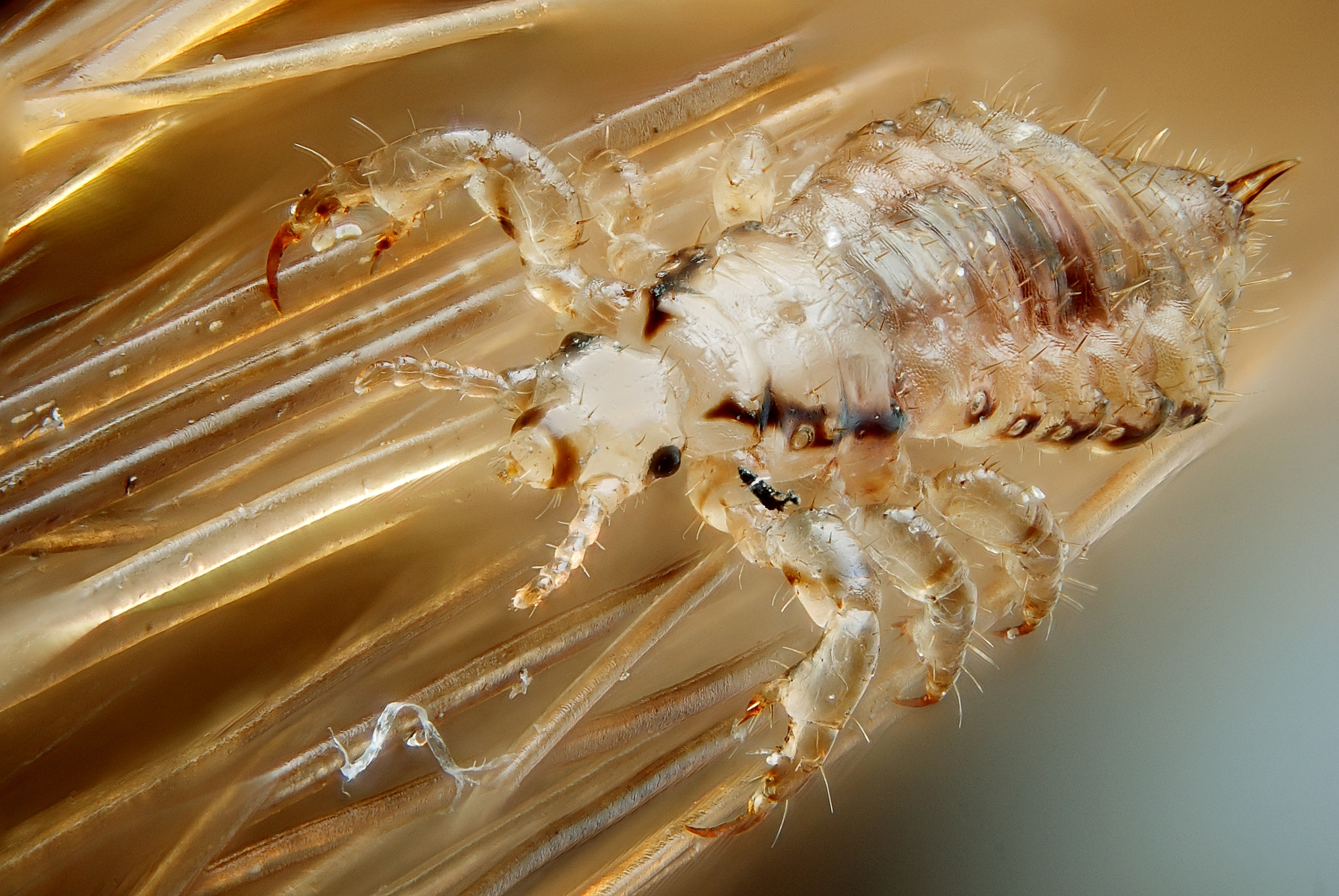

Scientific classification
- Kingdom: Animalia
- Phylum: Arthropoda
- Clade: Pancrustacea
- Class: Insecta
- Order: Psocodea
- Infraorder: Phthiraptera
- Family: Pediculidae
- Genus: Pediculus
- Species: P. humanus
- Subspecies: P. h. capitis

Trinomial name
- Pediculus humanus capitis De Geer, 1767

Synonyms
- Pediculus capitis (De Geer, 1767)

= Head louse =

Insect parasite of humans

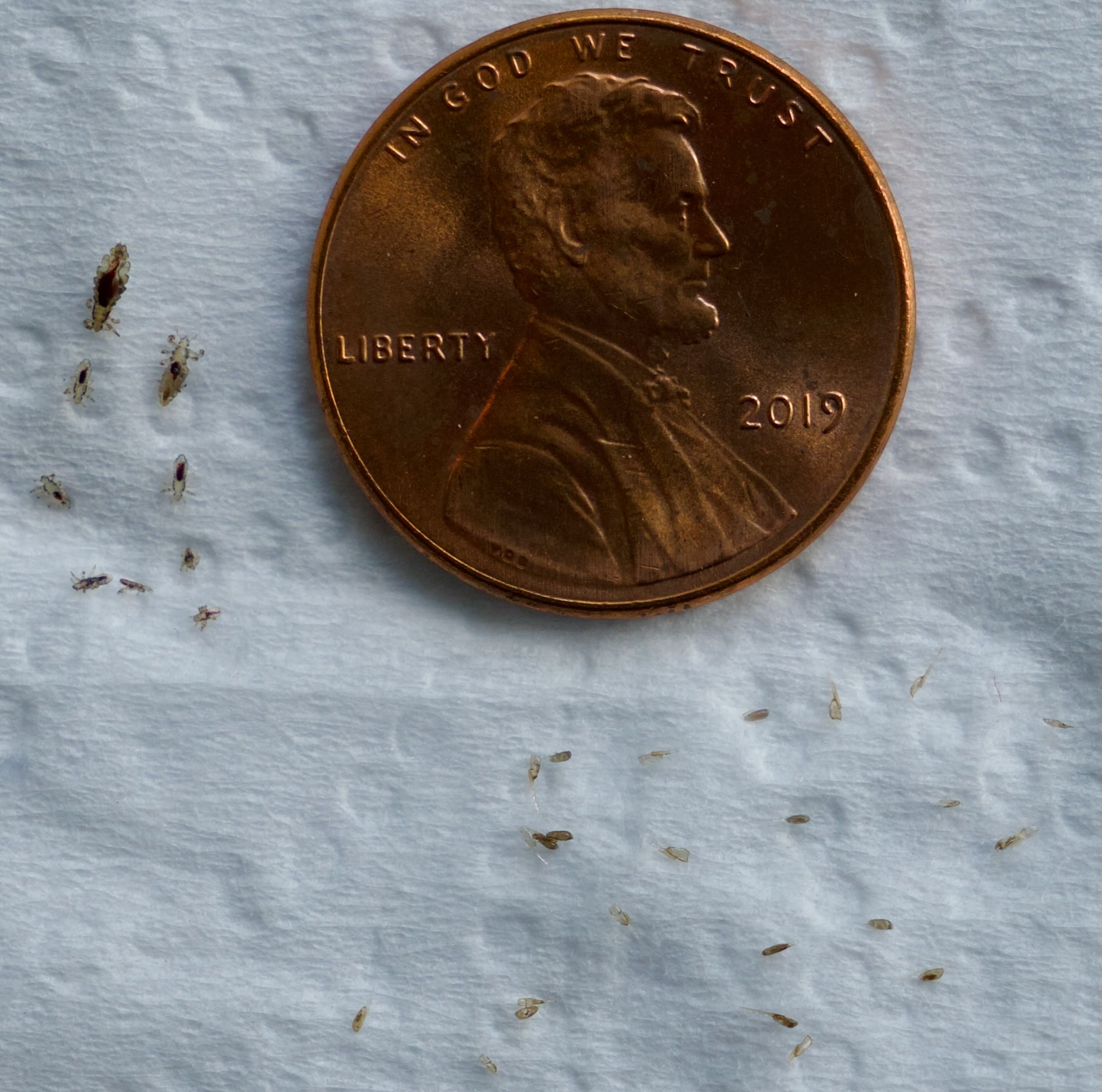
Head louse and nits size comparison

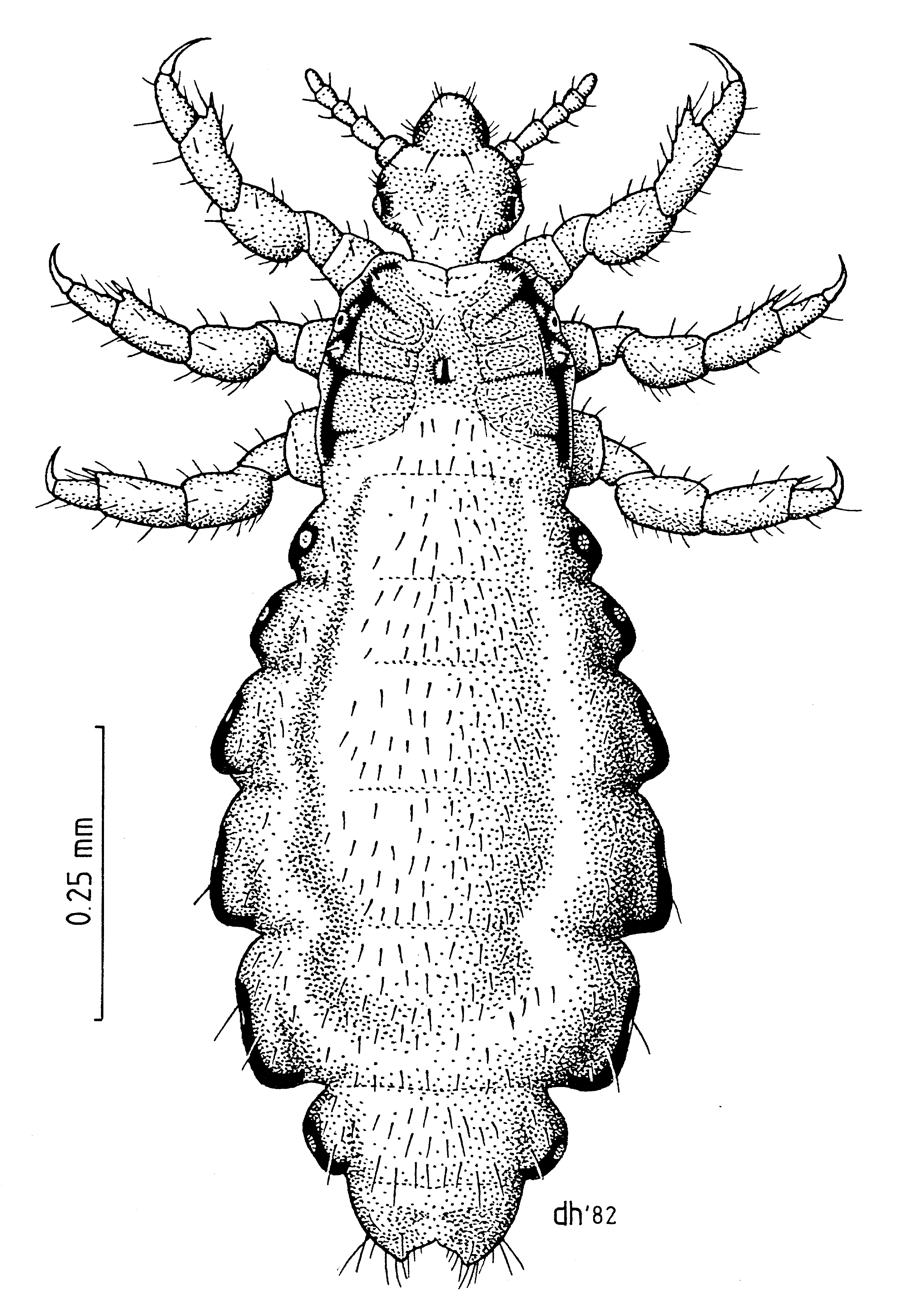
Pediculus humanus capitis by Des Helmore

The head louse (Pediculus humanus capitis) is an obligate ectoparasite of humans. Head lice are wingless insects that spend their entire lives on the human scalp and feed exclusively on human blood. Humans are the only known hosts of this specific parasite, while chimpanzees and bonobos host a closely related species, Pediculus schaeffi. Other species of lice infest most orders of mammals and all orders of birds.

Lice differ from other hematophagic ectoparasites such as fleas in spending their entire lifecycle on a host. Head lice cannot fly, and their short, stumpy legs render them incapable of jumping, or even walking efficiently on flat surfaces.

The non-disease-carrying head louse differs from the related disease-carrying body louse (Pediculus humanus humanus) in preferring to attach eggs to scalp hair rather than to clothing. The two subspecies are morphologically almost identical, but do not normally interbreed. From genetic studies, they are thought to have diverged as subspecies approximately 30,000–110,000 years ago, when many humans began to wear significant amounts of clothing. However, the degree of separation is contentious as they can produce fertile offspring in a laboratory.

A much more distantly related species of hair-clinging louse, the pubic or crab louse (Pthirus pubis), also infests humans. It is morphologically different from the other two species and is much closer in appearance to the lice which infest other primates. Louse infestation of the body is known as pediculosis, pediculosis capitis for head lice, pediculosis corporis for body lice, and phthiriasis for pubic lice.

== Adult morphology ==
Head louse crawling on a hairbrush

Like other insects of the suborder Anoplura, adult head lice are small (2.5–3 mm long), dorsoventrally flattened (see anatomical terms of location), and wingless. The thoracic segments are fused, but otherwise distinct from the head and abdomen, the latter being composed of seven visible segments. Head lice are grey in general, but their precise color varies according to the environment in which they were raised. After feeding, consumed blood causes the louse body to take on a reddish color.

=== Head ===
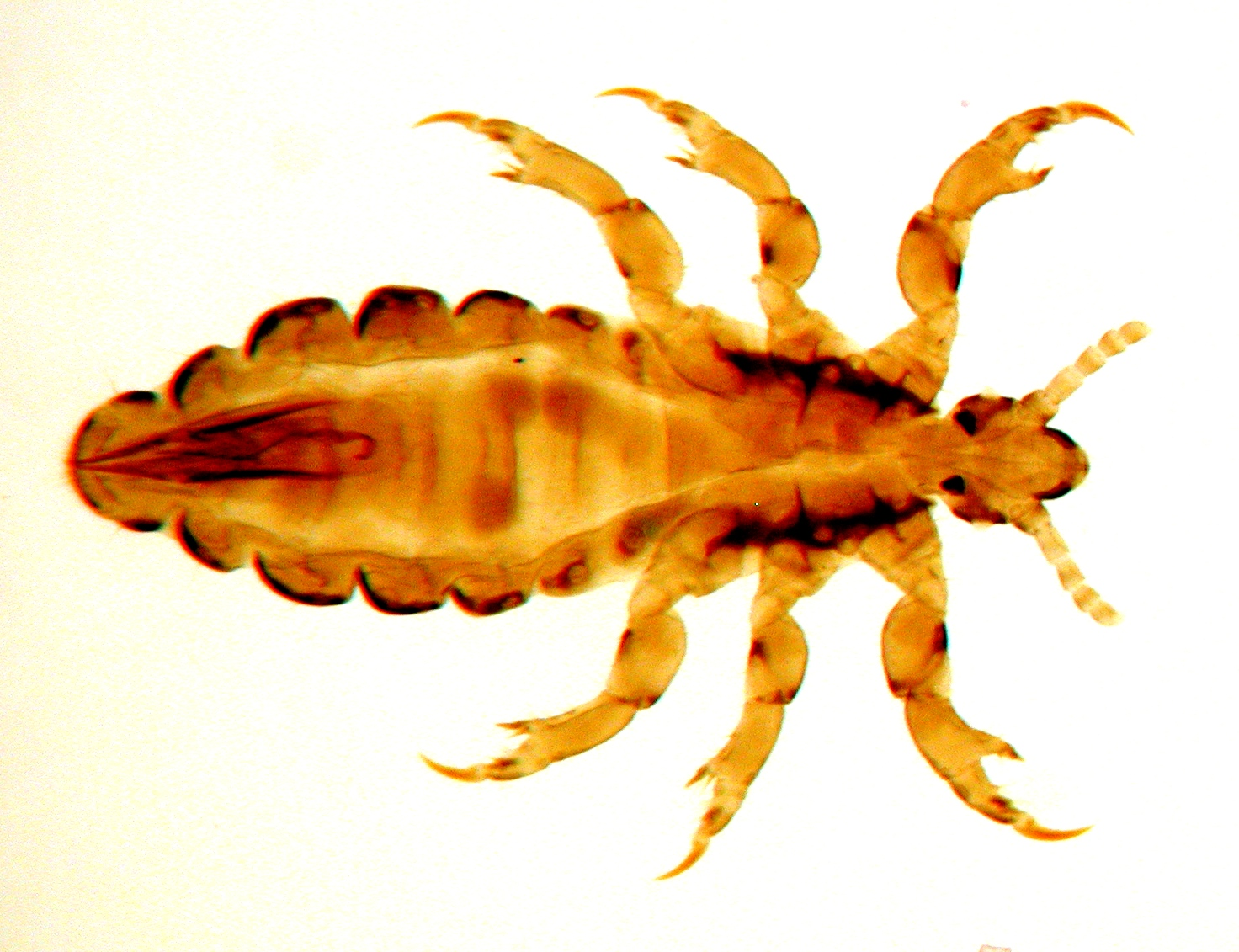
Male head louse, adult

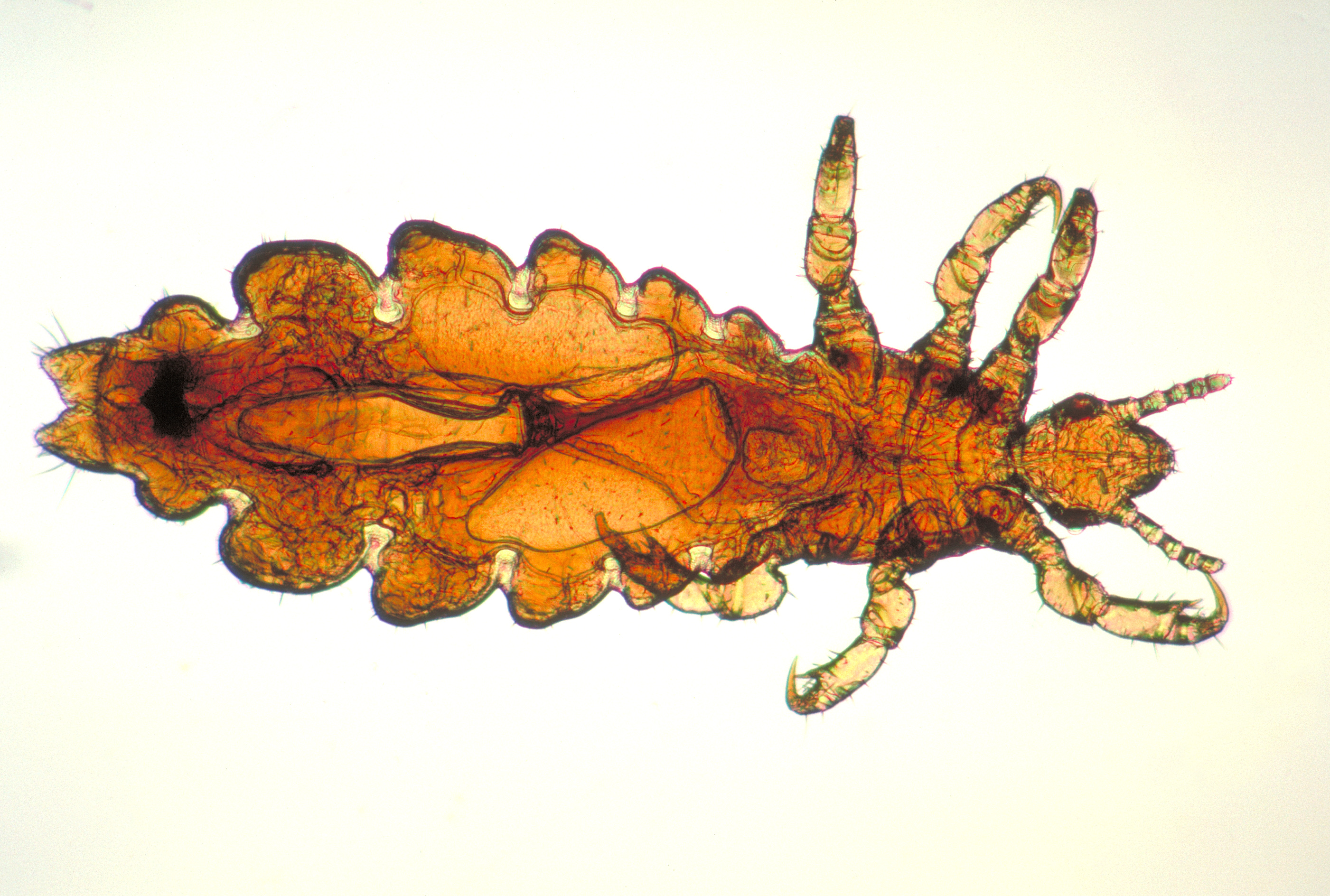
Female head louse, adult

One pair of antennae, each with five segments, protrudes from the insect's head. Head lice also have one pair of eyes. Eyes are present in all species within the Pediculidae family, but are reduced or absent in most other members of the Anoplura suborder. Like other members of the Anoplura, head louse mouthparts are highly adapted for piercing the skin and sucking blood. These mouth parts are retracted into the insect's head except during feeding.

=== Thorax ===
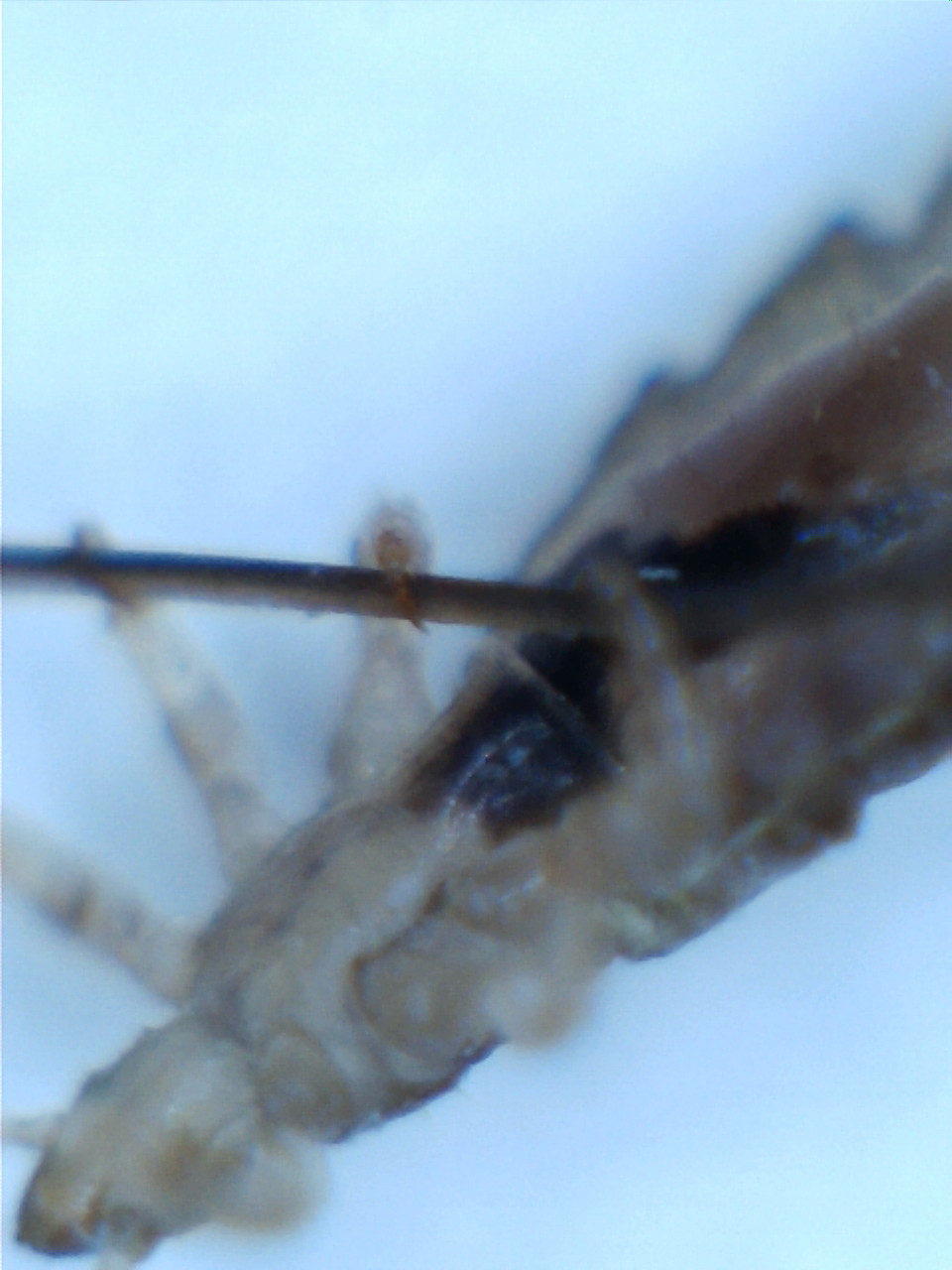
Head louse gripping a human hair

Six legs project from the fused segments of the thorax. As is typical in the Anoplura, these legs are short and terminate with a single claw and opposing "thumb". Between its claw and thumb, the louse grasps the hair of its host. With their short legs and large claws, lice are well adapted to clinging to the hair of their host. These adaptations leave them incapable of jumping, or even walking efficiently on flat surfaces. Lice can climb up strands of hair very quickly, allowing them to move swiftly and reach another host.

=== Abdomen ===
Seven segments of the louse abdomen are visible. The first six segments each have a pair of spiracles through which the insect breathes. The last segment contains the anus and (separately) the genitalia.

=== Sex differences ===
In male lice, the front two legs are slightly larger than the other four. This specialized pair of legs is used for holding the female during copulation. Males are somewhat smaller than females and are characterized by a pointed end of the abdomen and a well-developed genital apparatus visible inside the abdomen. Females are characterized by two gonopods in the shape of a W at the end of their abdomens.

== Eggs and nits ==
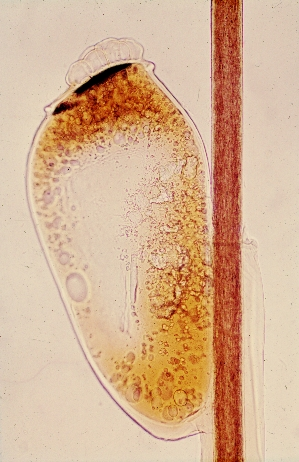
Head louse egg (nit) attached to hair shaft of host

Like most insects, head lice are oviparous. Females lay about three or four eggs per day. Louse eggs (also known as nits) are attached near the base of a host hair shaft. Eggs are usually laid on the base of the hair, 3–5 mm off the scalp surface. In warm climates, and especially the tropics, eggs may be laid 6 inches (15 cm) or more down the hair shaft.

To attach an egg, the adult female secretes a glue from her reproductive organ. This glue quickly hardens into a "nit sheath" that covers the hair shaft and large parts of the egg except for the operculum, a cap through which the embryo breathes. The glue was previously thought to be chitin-based, but more recent studies have shown it to be made of proteins similar to hair keratin.

Each egg is oval-shaped and approximately 0.8 mm in length. They are bright, transparent, and tan to coffee-colored so long as they contain an embryo, but appear white after hatching. Head lice hatch typically six to nine days after oviposition.

After hatching, the louse nymph leaves behind its egg shell, still attached to the hair shaft. The empty eggshell remains in place until it is physically removed by abrasion or the host, or until it slowly disintegrates, which may take six months or more.

SEM images of a head louse egg
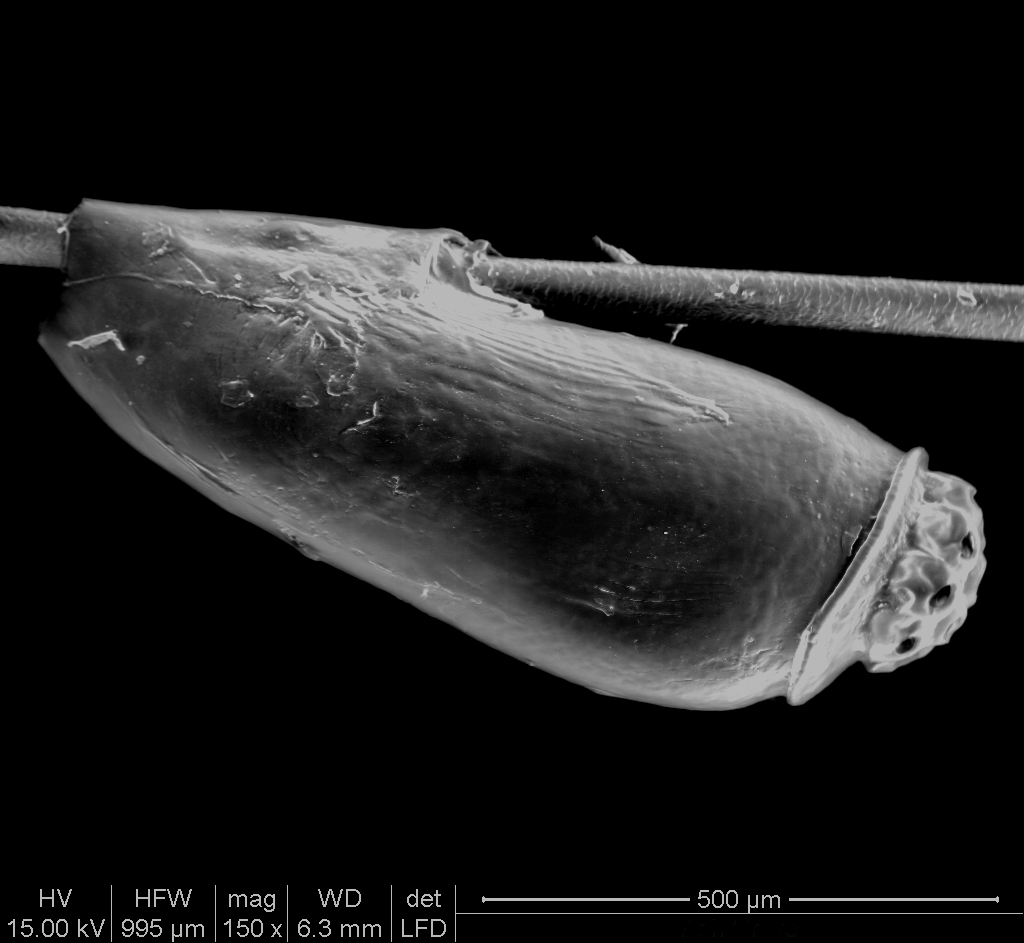
Louse egg attached to a hair shaft of its host

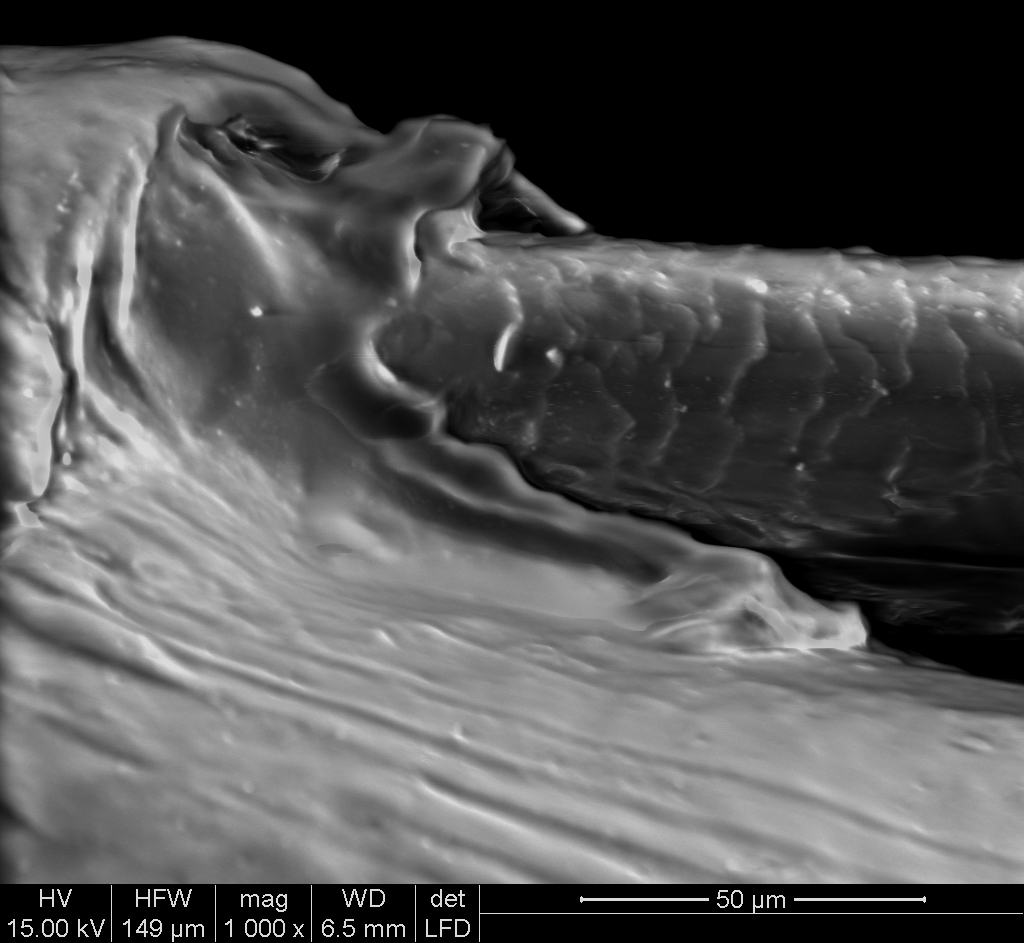
The female reproductive organ secretes a glue that quickly hardens into a "nit sheath" to cover the hair shaft and large parts of the egg, except for the operculum.

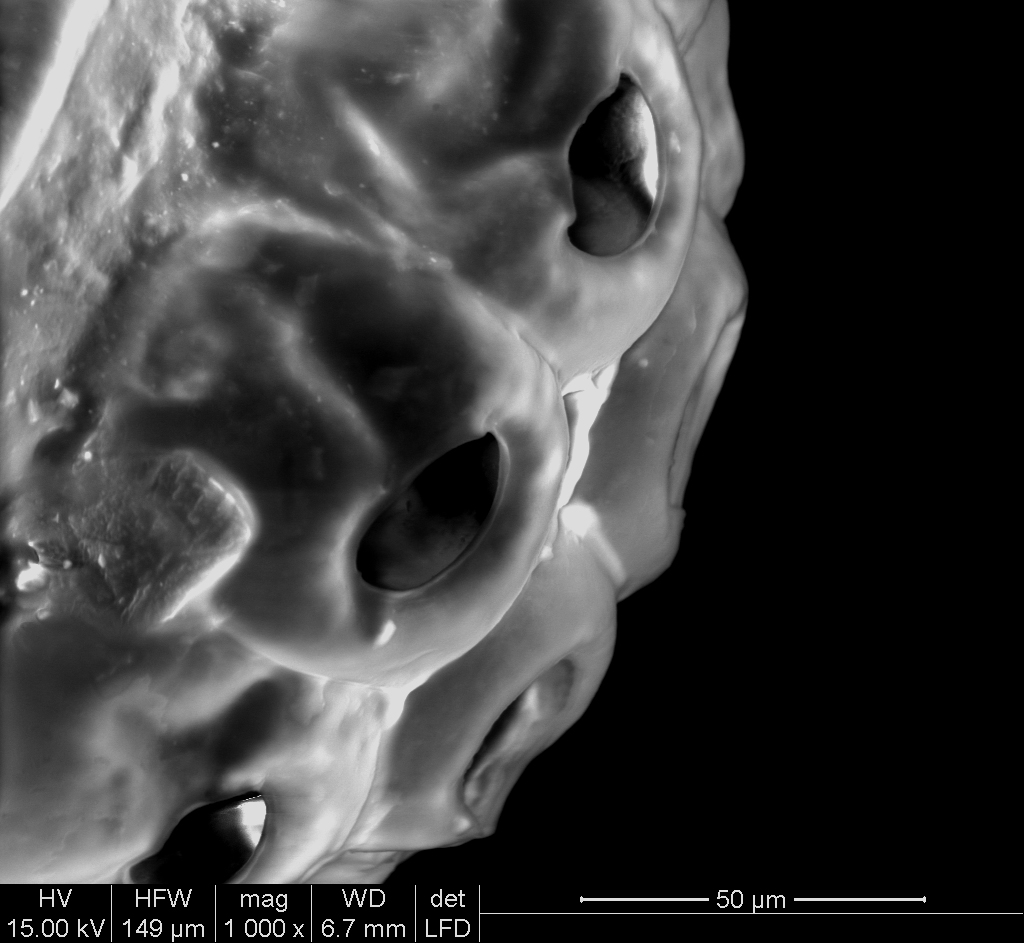
The operculum allows the embryo to breathe.

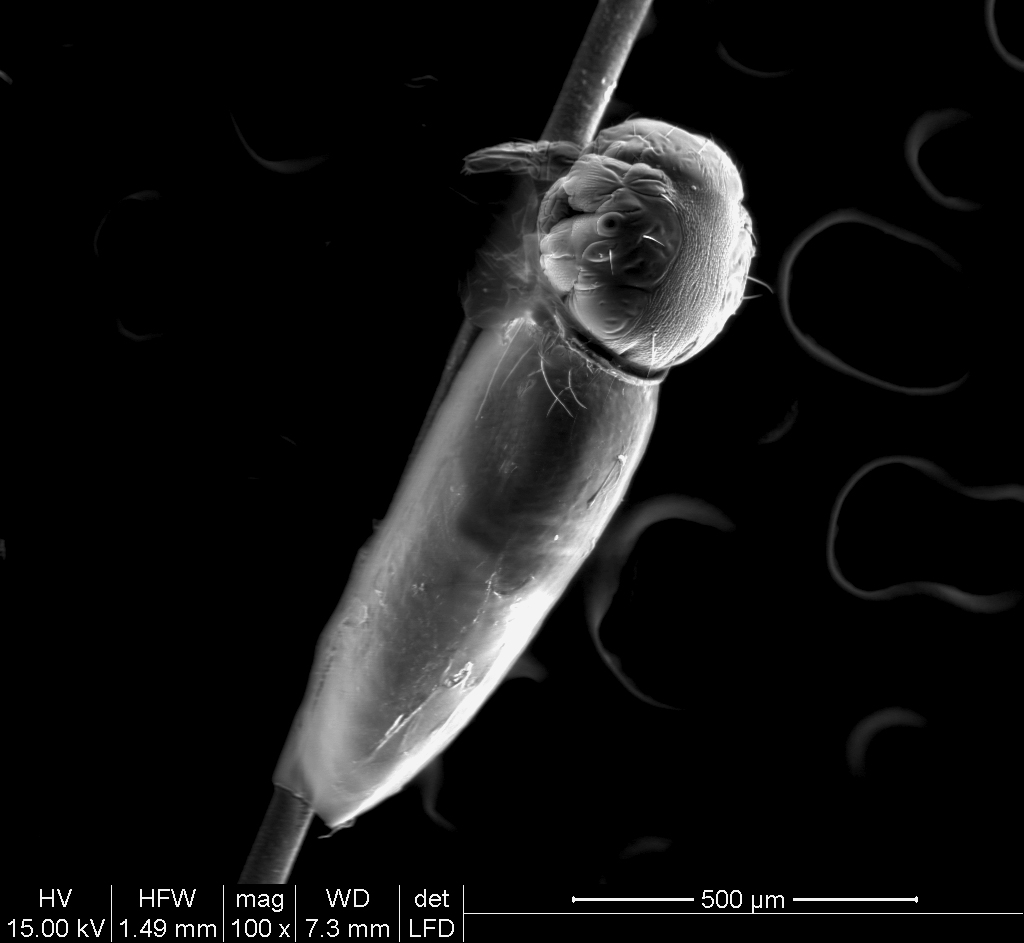
A first-stage nymph hatching from an egg

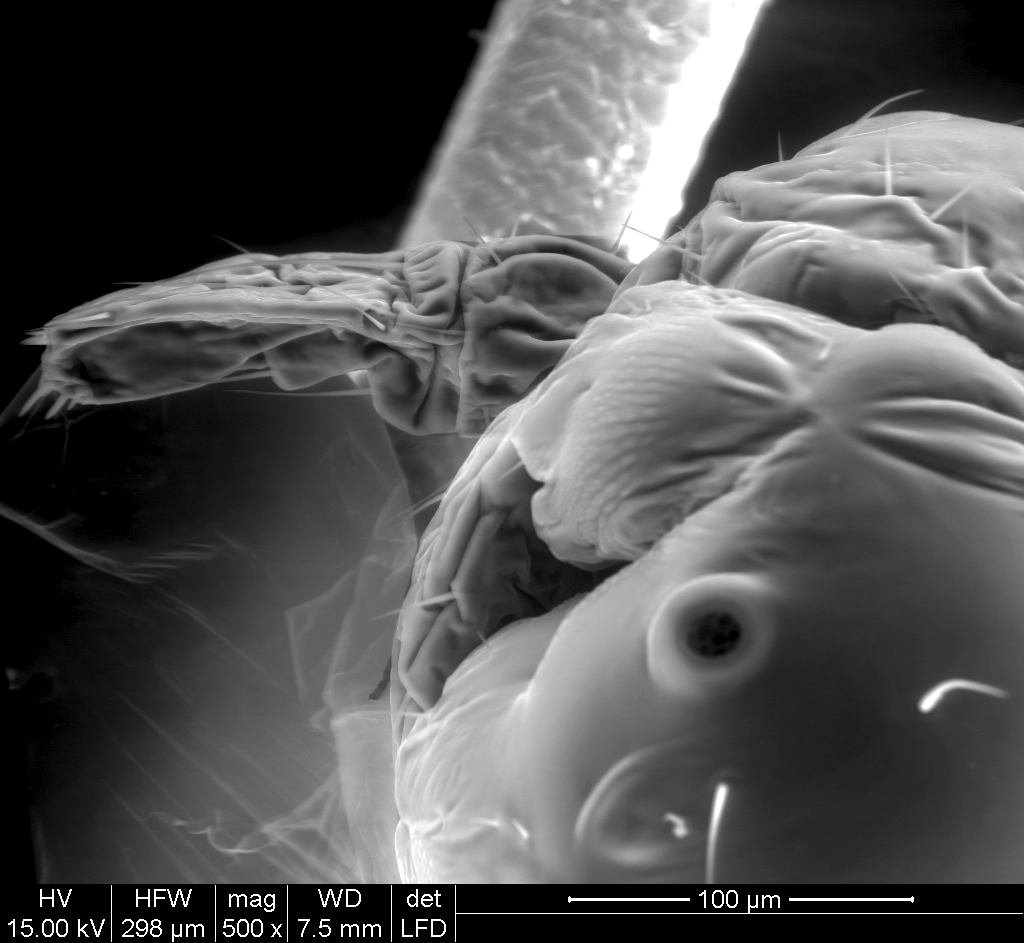
A first-stage nymph hatching from an egg (detail)

Empty shells are matte, collapsed, and white. The term nit may include any of the following:

- Viable eggs that will eventually hatch
- Remnants of already-hatched eggs (nits)
- Nonviable eggs (dead embryo) that will never hatch

Of these three, only eggs containing viable embryos have the potential to infest or reinfest a host. However, a no nit policy is a common public health measure to prevent transmission of lice. Some authors have therefore restricted the definition of nit to describe only a hatched or nonviable egg:

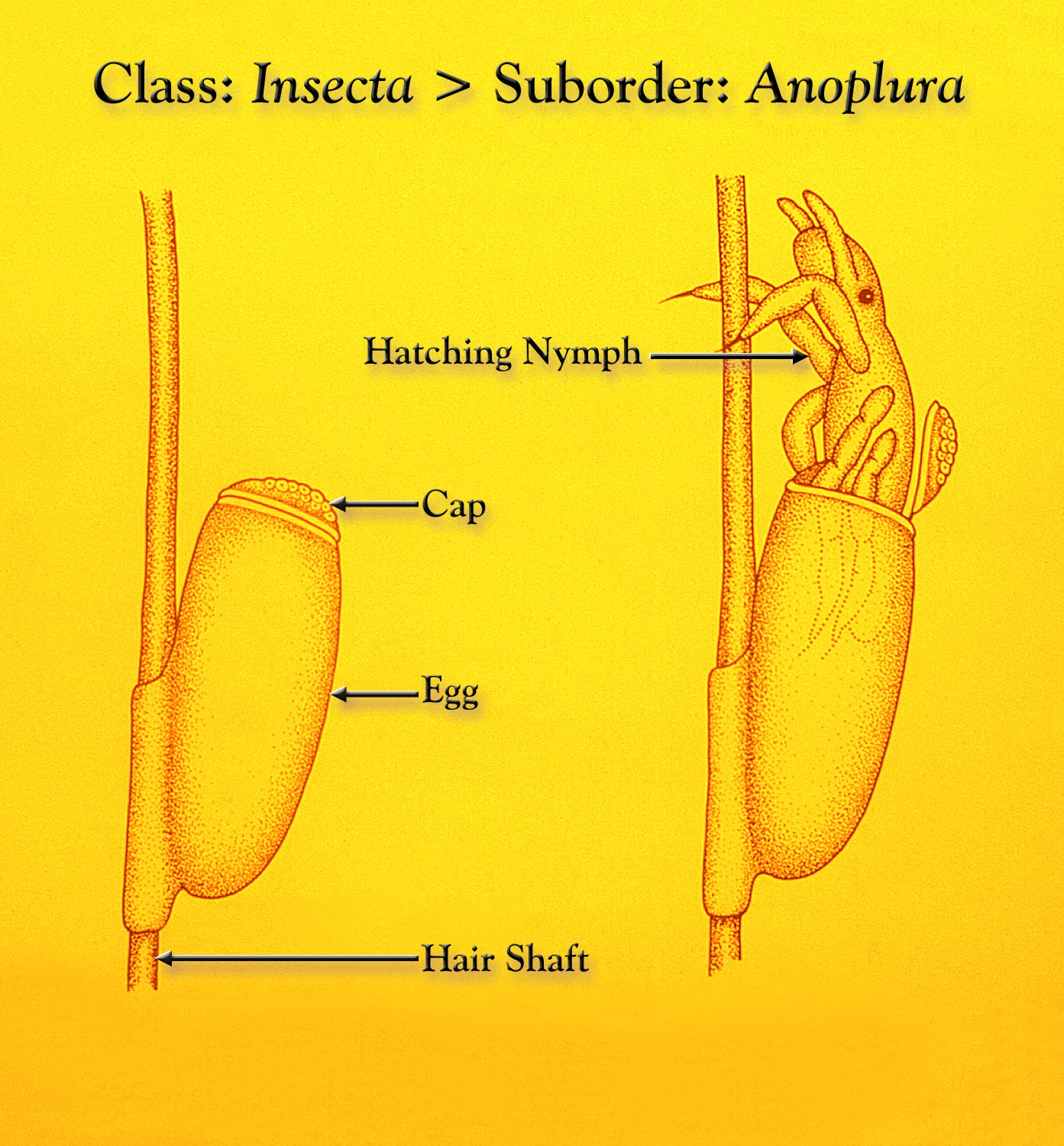
Louse hatching

In many languages, the terms used for the hatched eggs, which were obvious for all to see, have subsequently become applied to the embryonated eggs that are difficult to detect. Thus, the term "nit" in English is often used for both. However, in recent years, my colleagues and I have felt the need for some simple means of distinguishing between the two without laborious qualification. We have, therefore, come to reserve the term "nit" for the hatched and empty egg shell and refer to the developing embryonated egg as an "egg".

— Ian F. Burgess (1995)

The empty eggshell, termed a nit...

— J. W. Maunder (1983)

...nits (dead eggs or empty egg cases)...

— Kosta Y. Mumcuoglu and others (2006)

Others have retained the broad definition, while simultaneously attempting to clarify its relevance to infestation:

In the United States the term "nit" refers to any egg regardless of its viability.

— Terri Lynn Meinking (1999)

Because nits are simply egg casings that can contain a developing embryo or be empty shells, not all nits are infective.

— L. Keoki Williams and others (2001)

Head lice eggs (nits) are brown or white (empty shells) and attached to the hair

— NHS (2018)

In British and Irish slang, the term "nit" is often used across different age groups to refer to head lice themselves.

== Development and nymphs ==
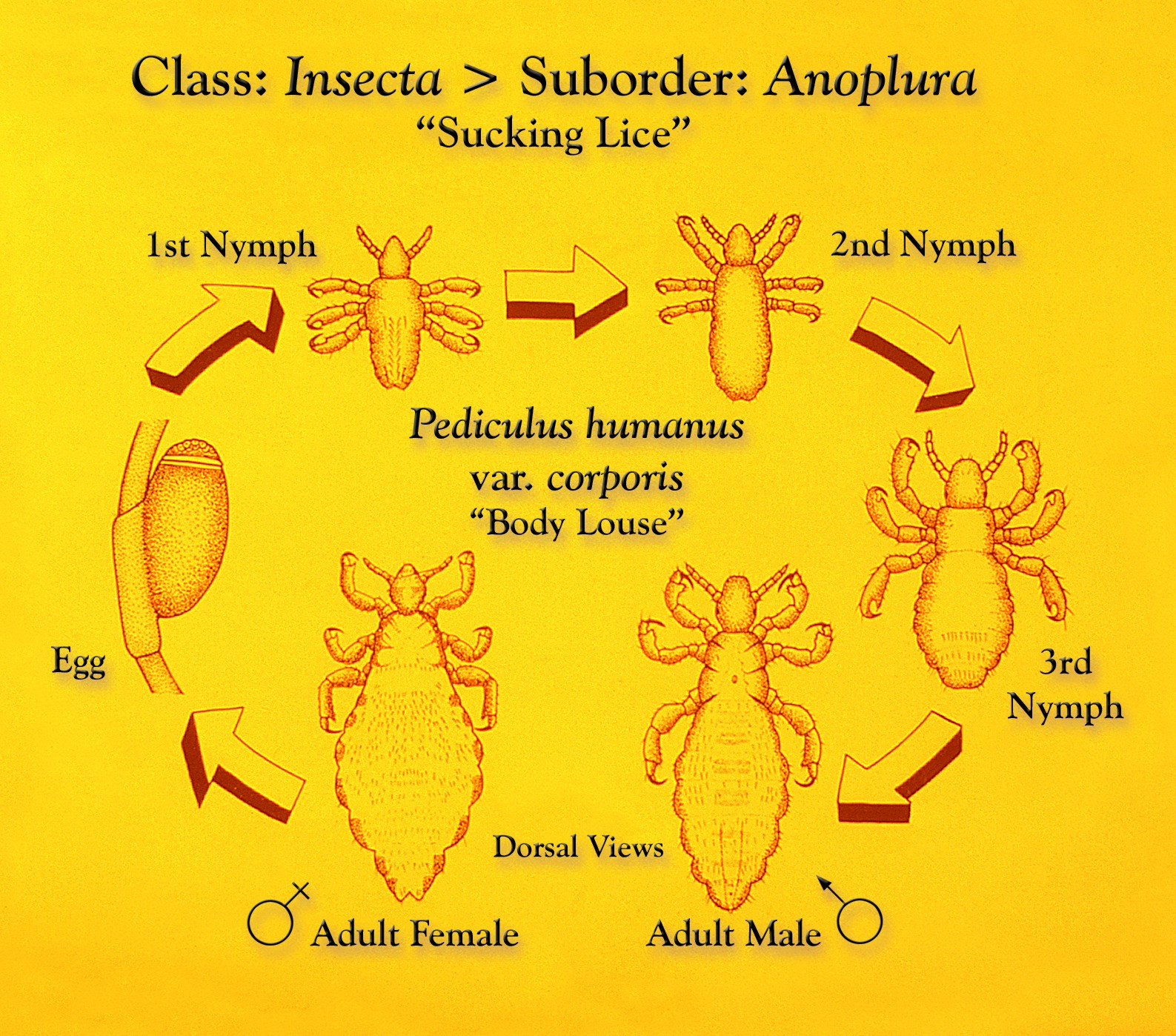
Development of Pediculus humanus humanus (body lice), which is similar to that of head lice (Pediculus humanus capitis)

Head lice, like other insects of the order Phthiraptera, are hemimetabolous. Newly hatched nymphs will moult three times before reaching the sexually mature adult stage. Thus, mobile head lice populations may contain eggs, nits, three nymphal instars, and the adults (male and female) (imago). Metamorphosis during head louse development is subtle. The only visible differences between different instars and the adult, other than size, is the relative length of the abdomen, which increases with each molt, as well as the existence of reproductive organs in the adults. Aside from reproduction, the behavior of nymphs is similar to that of adults. Like adults, nymphs feed also only on human blood (hematophagia), and cannot survive long away from a host. Outside their hosts lice cannot survive more than 24 hours. The time required for head lice to complete their nymph development to the imago lasts for 12–15 days.

Nymph mortality in captivity is about 38%, especially within the first two days of life. In the wild, mortality may instead be highest in the third instar. Nymph hazards are numerous. Failure to completely hatch from the egg is invariably fatal. Death during molting can also occur, although it is reportedly uncommon. During feeding, the nymph's gut can rupture, dispersing the host's blood throughout the insect's body. This results in death within a day or two. Whether the high mortality recorded under experimental conditions is representative of conditions in the wild is unclear.

== Reproduction and lifespan ==
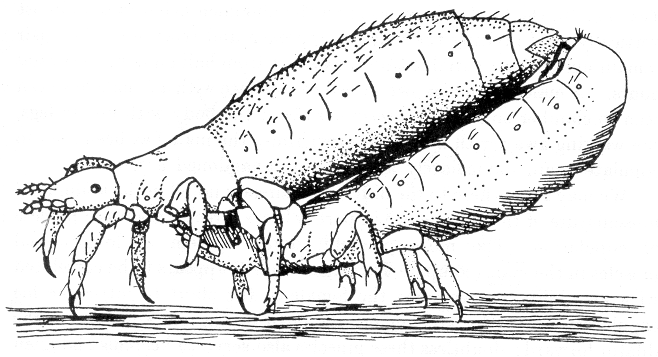
Copulation in Pediculus humanus humanus (Pediculus humanus capitis is similar), female is on top, with the male below. Dilation of the female's vagina has already occurred, and the male's dilator rests against his back (dorsal surface), out of the way. The male vesica, which contains the penis proper (not seen), is fully inserted into the vagina. Note the male's attachment with his specialized claws on the first leg pair to the specialized notch on the female's third leg pair.

Head lice reproduce sexually, and copulation is necessary for the female to produce fertile eggs. Parthenogenesis, the production of viable offspring by virgin females, does not occur in Pediculus humanus. Pairing can begin within the first 10 hours of adult life. After 24 hours, adult lice copulate frequently, with mating occurring during any period of the night or day. Mating attachment frequently lasts more than an hour. Young males can successfully pair with older females, and vice versa.

Experiments with P. h. humanus (body lice) emphasize the attendant hazards of lice copulation. A single young female confined with six or more males will die in a few days, having laid very few eggs. Similarly, death of a virgin female was reported after admitting a male to her confinement. The female laid only one egg after mating, and her entire body was tinged with red—a condition attributed to rupture of the alimentary canal during the sexual act. Old females frequently die following, if not during, copulation. During its lifespan of 4 weeks, a female louse lays 50-150 eggs. Eggs hatch within 6–9 days, each nymphal stage lasts for 4–5 days, and accordingly, the period from egg to adults lasts for 18–24 days. Adult lice live for an additional 3–4 weeks.

== Factors affecting infestation ==
The number of children per family, the sharing of beds and closets, hair washing habits, local customs and social contacts, healthcare in a particular area (e.g., school), and socioeconomic status were found to be significant factors in head louse infestation. Girls are two to four times more frequently infested than boys. Children between 4 and 14 years of age are the most frequently infested group.

== Behaviour ==
=== Feeding ===
All stages except eggs are blood-feeders and bite the skin four to five times daily to feed. They inject saliva which contains an anticoagulant and suck blood. The digested blood is excreted as dark red frass.

=== Position on host ===
Although any part of the scalp may be colonized, lice favor the nape of the neck and the area behind the ears, where the eggs are usually laid. Head lice are repelled by light and move towards shadows or dark-coloured objects in their vicinity.

=== Transmission ===
Lice have no wings or powerful legs for jumping, so they use the claws on their legs to move from hair to hair. Normally, head lice infest a new host only by close contact between individuals, making social contacts among children and parent-child interactions more likely routes of infestation than shared combs, hats, brushes, towels, clothing, beds, or closets. Head-to-head contact is by far the most common route of lice transmission.

== Distribution ==
Approximately 6–12 million people, mainly children, are treated annually for head lice in the United States alone. In the UK, it is estimated that two-thirds of children will experience at least one case of head lice before leaving primary school. High levels of louse infestations have also been reported from all over the world, including Australia, Denmark, France, Ireland, Israel, and Sweden.

== Archaeogenetics ==
Analysis of the DNA of lice found on Peruvian mummies may indicate that some diseases (such as typhus) may have passed from the New World to the Old World, instead of the other way around.

== Genome ==
The sequencing of the genome of the body louse was first proposed in the mid-2000s and the annotated genome was published in 2010. An analysis of the body and head louse transcriptomes revealed these two organisms are extremely similar genetically. Indeed, transcriptome analyses raises the possible that they differ due to phenotypic flexibility and this is "probably a result of regulatory changes, perhaps epigenetic in origin, triggered by environmental signals."

Unlike other bilateral animals, the 37 mitochondrial genes of human lice are not on a single circular chromosome but are extensively fragmented. For the head louse, and the body louse, they are on 20 minichromosomes, for the pubic louse 14 minichromosomes and the chimpanzee louse,18 minichromosomes.

== Mitochondrial clades ==
Human lice are divided into three deeply divergent mitochondrial clades known as A, B, and C. Three subclades have been identified, D (a sister clade of A), E (a sister clade of C), and F (a sister clade of B).

=== Clade A ===
- head and body: worldwide
- found in ancient Roman Judea

=== Clade D (sister of clade A) ===
- head and body: Central Africa, Ethiopia, United States

=== Clade B ===
- head only: worldwide
- found in ancient Roman Judea and a 4,000-year-old Chilean mummy

=== Clade F (sister of clade B) ===
- head and body: South America

=== Clade C ===
- head only: Ethiopia, Nepal, Thailand

=== Clade E (sister of clade C) ===
- head only: West Africa

== See also ==
- Body louse
- Crab louse
- Lindane
- List of parasites of humans
- Nitpicking
- Pediculosis
- Treatment of human head lice
