= Treatment of human lice =

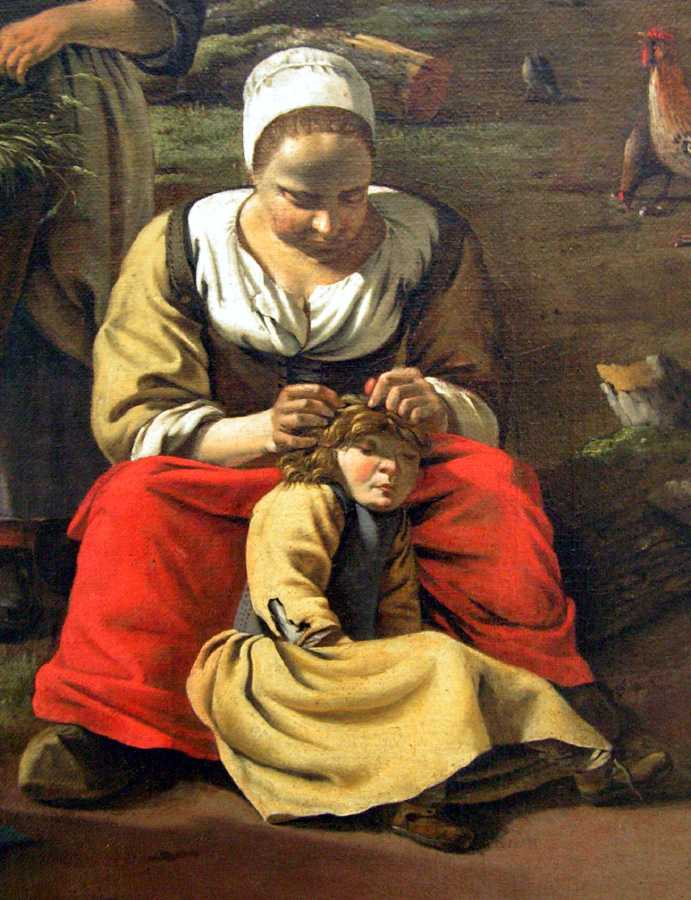
- Mother hunting for headlice, detail of a painting by Jan Siberechts
- Specialty: Infectious disease

The treatment of human lice is the removal of head lice parasites from human hair. It has been debated and studied for centuries. However, the number of cases of human louse infestations (or pediculosis) has increased worldwide since the mid-1960s, reaching hundreds of millions annually. There is no product or method that assures 100% destruction of the eggs and hatched lice after a single treatment. However, there are a number of treatment modalities that can be employed with varying degrees of success. These methods include chemical treatments, natural products, combs, shaving, hot air, and silicone-based lotions.

Treatment is recommended only after a clear diagnosis since all treatments have potential side effects. Louse eggs hatch 6–9 days after oviposition. Therefore, a common recommendation is to repeat treatment with a pediculicide at least once after 10 days, when all lice have hatched. Between the two treatments (Days 2–9) the person will still be infested with lice that hatch from eggs not killed by the anti-louse product. Between the treatments, it is advised to wet the hair and comb daily with a louse-comb to remove the hatching lice. If no living lice are found, the treatment was successful, even if nits (eggs) are visible on the hair. If living lice are still present, the treatment is repeated using an anti-louse product with a different active ingredient. This is kept in the hair for 2 hours and then rinsed out, with the head and hair cleaned before sleep. Prophylactic treatment with pediculicides is not recommended.

== Medications ==
Insecticides used for the treatment of head lice include lindane, malathion, carbaryl, pyrethrum, piperonyl butoxide, permethrin, phenothrin, bioallethrin, and spinosad.

Many of the pediculicides in the market are either not fully effective or are ineffective when they are used according to the instructions. Pediculicides may rapidly lose their efficacy because of the development of resistance. Resistance of head lice to insecticides such as lindane, malathion, phenothrin and permethrin has been reported.

A 2021 systematic review and meta-analysis found that the mean frequency of pyrethroid resistance of lice was 77% globally, and even 100% in several countries (Australia, England, Israel, and Turkey). It concluded that treatment with current insecticides may not be effective and is likely the cause of increased levels of infestations.

Ivermectin by mouth has been shown to reduce levels of louse infestation. Ivermectin is approved by the U.S. Food and Drug Administration (FDA) for pediculosis.

Agents approved by the FDA for treatment of pediculosis include abametapir, topical ivermectin lotion, lindane, malathion, permethrin, and piperonyl butoxide with pyrethrins.

== Heated air ==
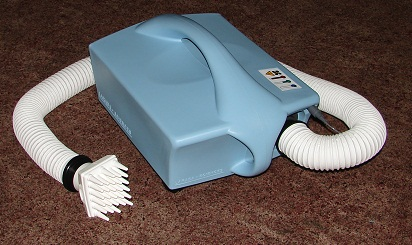
A heated air device designed by Larada Sciences to kill headlice by drying

A standard home blow dryer will kill 96.7% of eggs with proper technique. To be effective, the blow dryer must be used repeatedly (every 1 to 7 days since eggs hatch in 7 to 10 days) until the natural life cycle of the lice is over (about 4 weeks).

A number of commercial head lice treatment companies across the country offer a heated air treatment.

== Combing ==
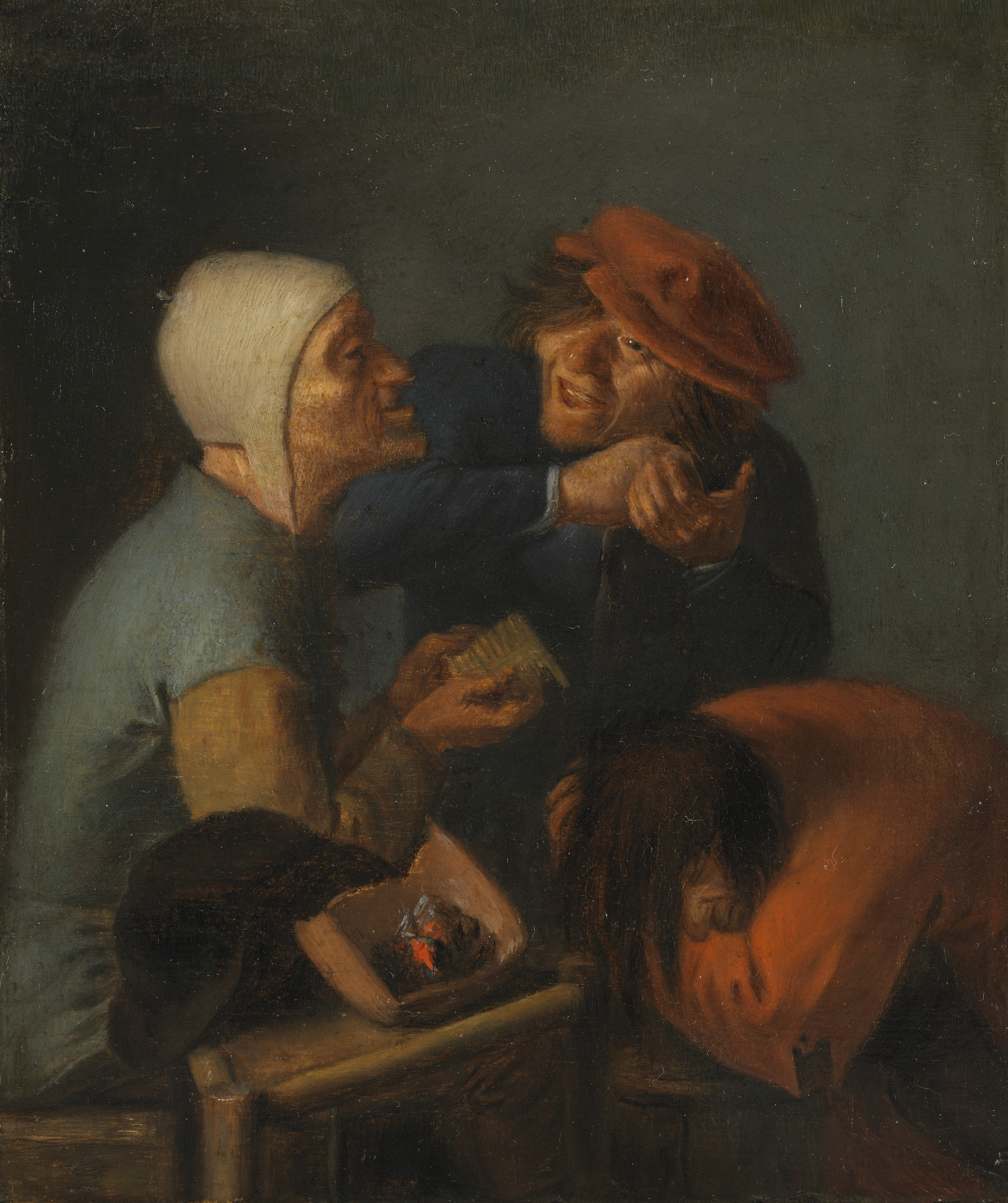
The delousing by Adriaen Brouwer

A special fine-toothed comb that can pick out lice is used. For a treatment with louse comb alone, it is recommended to comb the hair for an hour to an hour and a half (depending the length and type of the hair) daily or every second day for 14 days. Wetting the hair especially with water and shampoo or conditioner will facilitate the combing and the removal of lice, eggs and nits.

Electronic louse combs use a small electrical charge to kill lice. The metal teeth of the comb have alternating positively and negatively charged tines, which are powered by a small battery. When the comb is used on dry hair, lice make contact with multiple tines of the fine-toothed comb, thereby closing the circuit and receiving an electrical charge. A non-peer-reviewed letter has been published in a dermatology journal claiming effectiveness based on personal experience (total of 6 uses).

== Procedures ==
Shaving the head or cutting the hair extremely short can be used to control lice infestation. Short hair, baldness, or a shaven scalp are generally seen as a preventive measure against louse infestation. This will also eliminate – particularly if maintained for the length of the parasites' reproductive cycle – louse infestation.

Infestation with lice is not a serious disease and the medical symptoms are normally minimal. In any case, health providers and parents should try not to create emotional problems for children during examination and treatment.

Shaving of the area above and behind the ears and the upper part of the neck while leaving the crown of the head with hair is commonly used to prevent lice among tribes in Africa, Asia, and America (in America – Mohawk style).

== School treatment ==
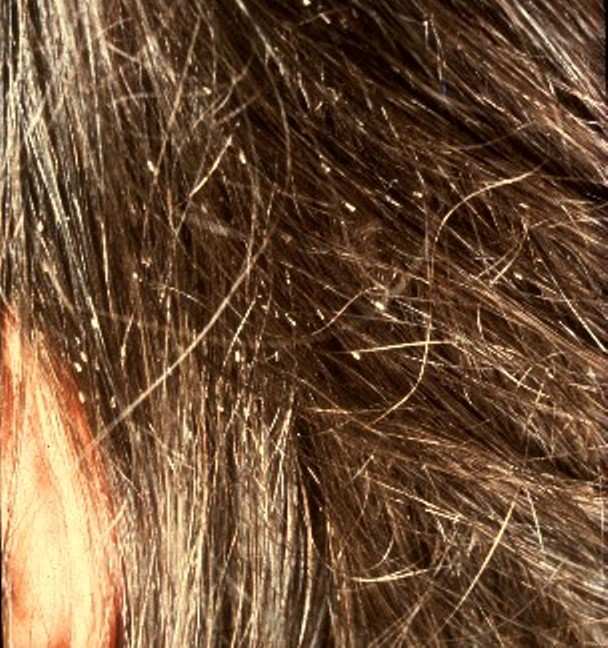
Head louse nits on human hair

Schools in the United States, Canada, and Australia commonly exclude infested students, and prevent return of those students until all lice, eggs, and nits are removed. This is the basis of the "no-nit policy". Data from a primarily American study during 1998–1999 found that no-nit policies were present at 82% of the schools attended by children suspected of louse infestation. A separate 1998 survey revealed that 60% of American school nurses felt that "forced absenteeism of any child who has any nits in their hair is a good idea."

A number of health researchers and organizations object to the no-nit policy. Opponents to the no-nit policy mention that visible nits may only be empty egg casings which pose no concern as transmission can only occur via live lice or eggs. This has led to the perception that the no-nit policy serves only to ease the workload of school nurses and punish the parents of infested children.

Proponents of the no-nit policy counter that only a consistently nit-free child can be reliably shown to be infestation-free. That is, the presence of nits serves as an indirect proxy for infestation status. Proponents argue that such a proxy is necessary because lice screening is prone to false negative conclusions (i.e., failure to find lice present on actively infested children). For example, a 1998 Israeli study found that 76% of live lice infestations were missed by visual inspection (as verified by subsequent combing methods). Although lice cannot fly or jump, they are fast and agile in their native environment (i.e., clinging to hairs near the warmth of the scalp), and will try to avoid the light used during inspection. Louse colonies are also sparse (often fewer than 10 lice), which can contribute to difficulty in finding live specimens. Further, lice populations consist predominantly of immature nymphs, which are even smaller and harder to detect than adult lice.

== Alternative medicine ==
Tea tree oil has been promoted as a treatment for head lice; however, evidence of its effectiveness is weak. A 2012 review of head lice treatment recommended against the use of tea tree oil for children because it could cause skin irritation or allergic reactions, because of contraindications, and because of a lack of knowledge about the oil's safety and effectiveness. Other home remedies such as putting vinegar, isopropyl alcohol, olive oil, mayonnaise, or melted butter in the hair have been partially disproven, The use of plastic bags may be dangerous. Similarly, the Centers for Disease Control and Prevention reports that swimming has no effect on treating lice, and can in fact harm the treatment by commercial products. Ethanol (ethyl alcohol, common alcohol) is toxic to arthropods including lice and an external application of it is harmless to humans.

=== Gasoline or kerosene ===
The use of kerosene or gasoline for prevention or treatment of lice is dangerous due to the inherent fire hazard. Since 1989, there have been at least nine cases of children being severely burned during such attempts. These cases apparently occurred because, contrary to popular belief, it is the fumes of the gasoline, rather than the liquid itself, that are flammable. These fumes can ignite due to the presence of even a small spark or open flame - such as those caused by electrical appliances, cigarette lighters, or pilot lights in stoves and water heaters. The use of gasoline to treat lice also carries a high risk of dermatitis (i.e. irritation of the scalp).

Before gasoline (Petrol) was used as fuel, it was sold in small bottles as a treatment against lice and their eggs. At that time, the word Petrol was a trade name.
