= Pediculosis =

Medical condition

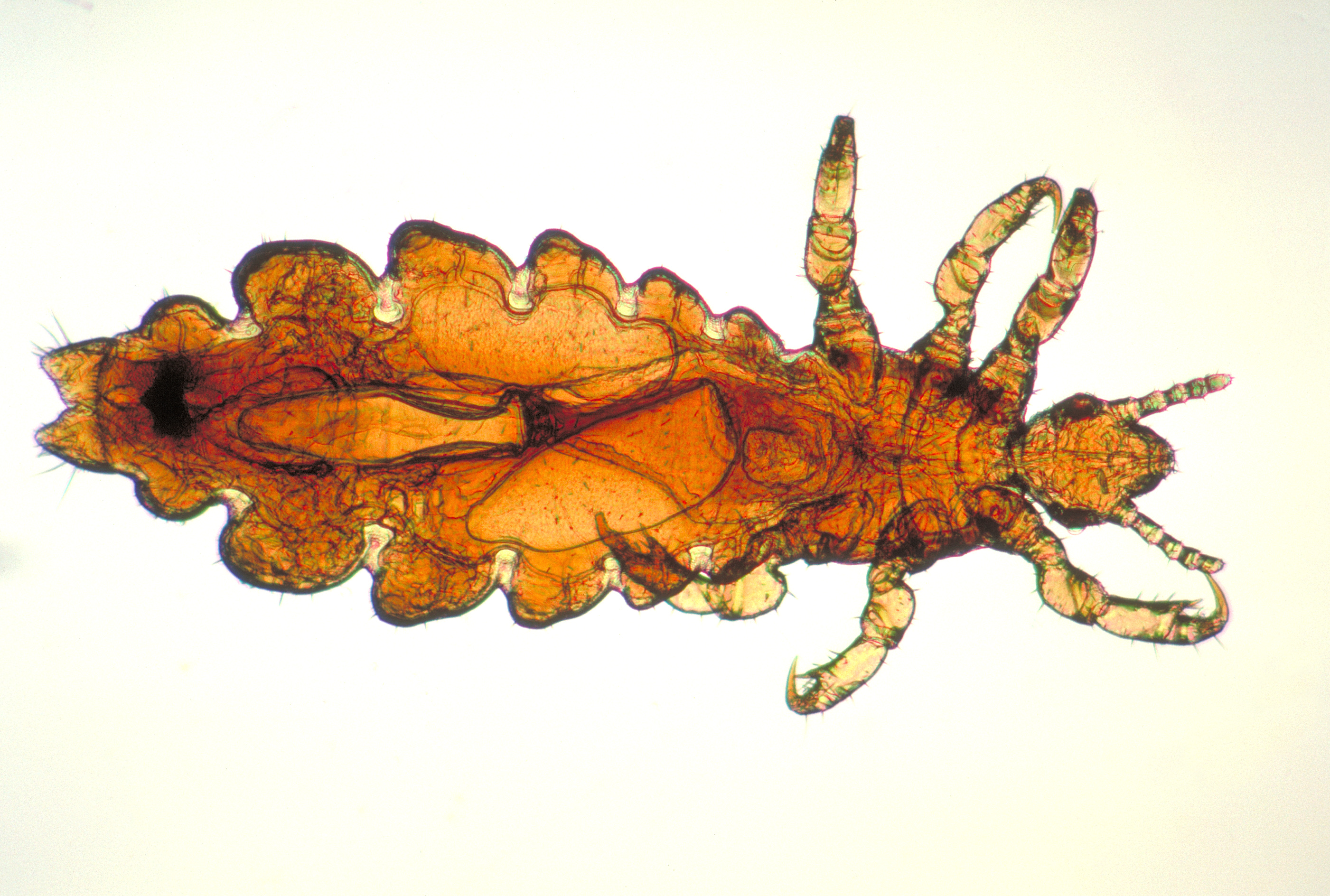
- Pediculus humanus capitis (♀)
- Specialty: Infectious disease

Pediculosis is an infestation of lice from the sub-order Anoplura, family Pediculidae. Accordingly, the infestation with head lice is named pediculosis capitis, while this with body lice, pediculosis corporis. Although pediculosis in humans may properly refer to lice infestation of any part of the body, the term is sometimes used loosely to refer to pediculosis capitis, the infestation of the human head with the specific head louse. This can typically happen in young children aged 3-11 and is spread from head to head contact.

== Classification ==
Pediculosis may be divided into the following types:

- Pediculosis capitis (Head lice infestation)
- Pediculosis corporis (Body louse infestation, also known as Pediculosis vestimenti, Vagabond's disease)
- Pediculosis pubis (Pubic louse infestation, also known as phthiriasis)

== Head lice ==
=== Presentation ===
Head louse crawling on a hairbrush

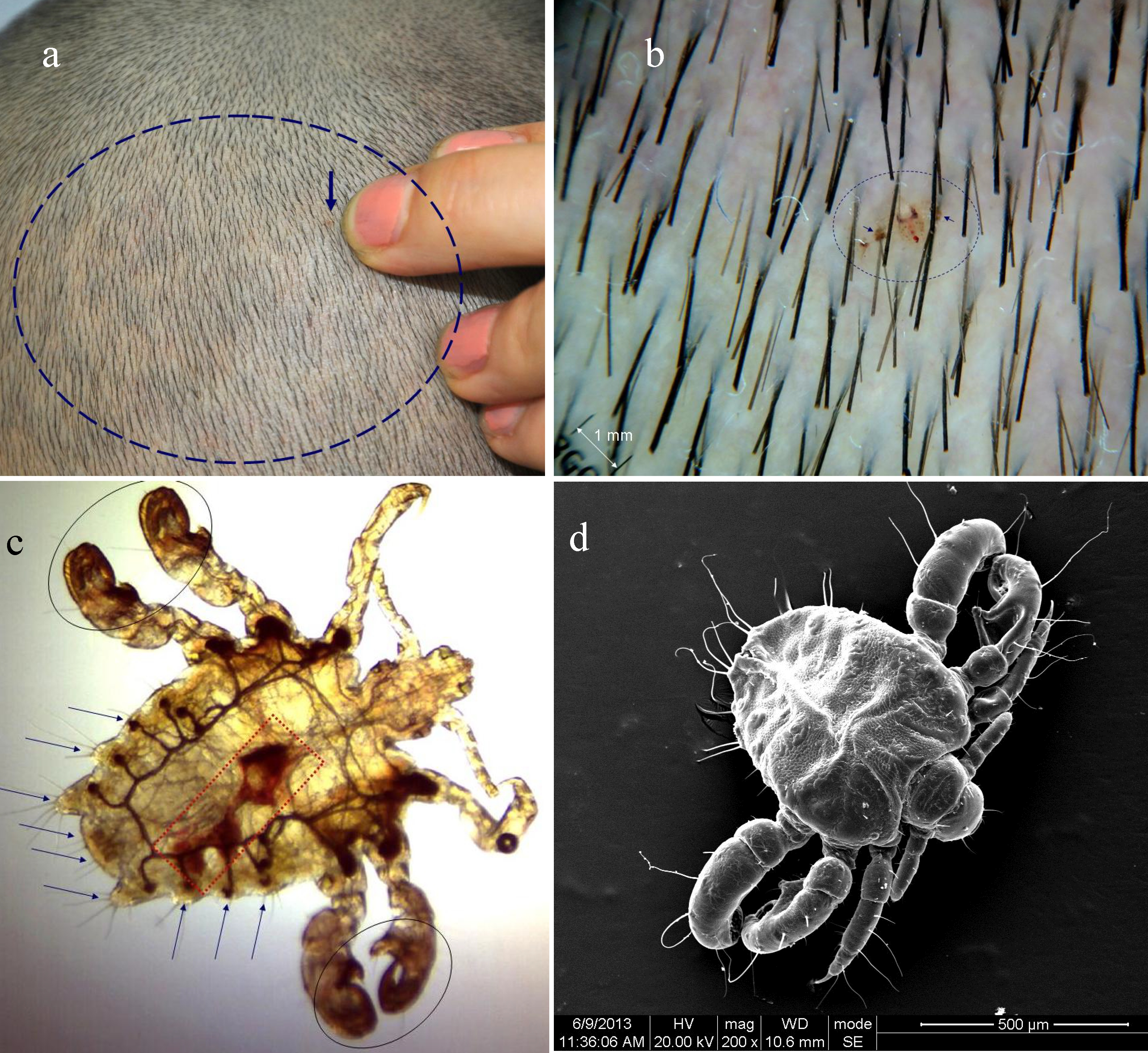
Phthiriasis in the head of a 6-year-old boy caused by phthiriasis pubis as confirmed by optical (c) and electron microscopy (d).

Head-lice infestation is most frequent on children aged 3–10 and their families. The CDC estimates that 6 to 12 million children aged 3 to 11 get lice every year. Females aged 3–12 years are most commonly infested. Those of African descent rarely experience infestation due to differences in hair texture.

The infestation is spread by close personal contact and possibly by shared combs, brushes, hats, and other personal items. Head lice are spread through direct head-to-head contact with an infested person. From each egg or "nit" may hatch one nymph that will grow and develop to the adult louse. Lice feed on blood once or more often each day by piercing the skin with their tiny needle-like mouthparts. While feeding they excrete saliva, which irritates the skin and causes itching. Lice cannot burrow into the skin.

=== Diagnosis ===
To diagnose infestation, the entire scalp should be combed thoroughly with a louse comb and the teeth of the comb should be examined for the presence of living lice after each time the comb passes through the hair. The use of a louse comb is the most effective way to detect living lice.

The most characteristic symptom of infestation is pruritus (itching) on the head that normally intensifies 3 to 4 weeks after the initial infestation. The bite reaction is very mild and it can be rarely seen between the hairs. Excessive scratching of the infested areas can cause sores, which may become infected.

=== Treatment ===
The number of diagnosed cases of human louse infestations (or pediculosis) has increased worldwide since the mid-1960s, reaching hundreds of millions annually. There is no product or method that assures 100% destruction of the eggs and hatched lice after a single treatment. However, there are a number of treatment methods that can be employed with varying degrees of success. These methods include chemical treatments, natural products, combs, shaving, hot air, silicone-based lotions, and ethanol (ethyl alcohol).

Pediculosis is commonly treated with permethrin lotion. FDA-approved products include permethrin for children 2 months and older, ivermectin (Sklice) for age 6 months and older, and pyrethrins for age two and older. These products should be applied twice, a week or so apart. Occlusive agents like petrolatum (Vaseline) can kill lice but are not well-studied. Combing with a fine-tooth metal comb is the only way to remove eggs, repeating every two to three days for 2 weeks.

=== Epidemiology ===
About 14 million people, mainly children, are treated annually for head lice in the United States alone. Only a small proportion of those treated, however, may have objective evidence of an extant infestation. High levels of louse infestations have also been reported from all over the world including Denmark, Sweden, U.K., France and Australia. Normally head lice infest a new host only by close contact between individuals, making social contacts among children and parent–child interactions more likely routes of infestation than shared combs, brushes, towels, clothing, beds or closets. Head-to-head contact is by far the most common route of lice transmission.

The United Kingdom's National Health Service, and many American health agencies, report that lice "prefer" clean hair, because it's easier to attach eggs and to cling to the strands.

Head lice (Pediculus humanus capitis) are not known to be vectors of diseases, unlike body lice (Pediculus humanus humanus), which are known vectors of epidemic or louse-borne typhus (Rickettsia prowazekii), trench fever (Rochalimaea quintana) and louse-borne relapsing fever (Borrelia recurrentis).

== Body lice ==
This condition is caused by body louse (Pediculus humanus humanus, sometimes called Pediculus humanus corporis), a louse that infests humans and is adapted to lay eggs in clothing, rather than at the base of hairs, and is thus of recent evolutionary origin.

== Other animals ==
Pediculosis is more common in cattle than any other type of domesticated animal. This is a significant problem, as it can cause weight loss of 55 to 75 pounds per animal. Some species of lice infesting cattle include the cattle biting louse (Bovicola bovis), the shortnosed cattle louse (Haematopinus eurysternus), the longnosed cattle louse (Linognathus vituli), and the little blue cattle louse (Solenopotes capillatus).

== History ==
In the 19th century, topical mercury treatment was used to treat pediculosis.

== See also ==
- Nitpicking
