= Vagabond's leukomelanoderma =

- Specialty: Dermatology

Vagabond's leukomelanoderma is a skin disorder found in the elderly with a combination of dietary deficiency and lack of hygiene, resulting in an infestation of Pediculus humanus. It presents with hypomelanosis related to scratching superimposed on background of diffuse hypermelanosis especially of the ankles, axillae, groin, inner thighs and the back of the neck.

== See also ==
- Vagabond's disease
- List of cutaneous conditions
