= Touching heads =

Human emotional expression

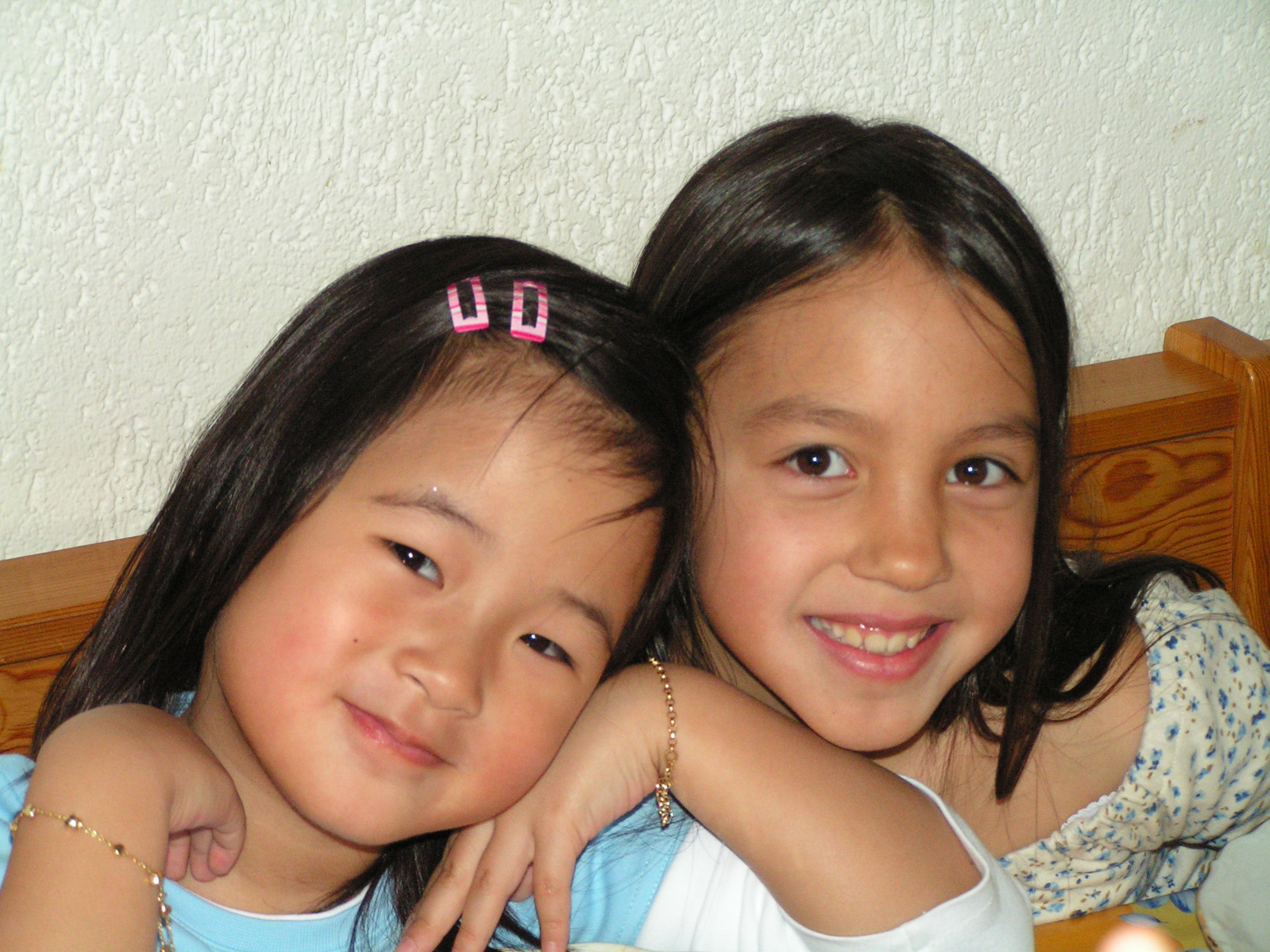
A bodily expression of positive emotions

Touching heads is an emotional expression.

It is absent in other apes, though they tend to use the same bodily expressions of emotions like humans. A 2012 study claimed that this behavior likely evolved in humans to share head lice among friends and relatives. Head lice infestations might serve as a protection against body lice by inducing cross-resistance. This can be adaptive because only the latter type of lice transmit potentially lethal human pathogens.
