= Pediculosis corporis =

- Other names: Pediculosis vestimenti, Vagabond's disease
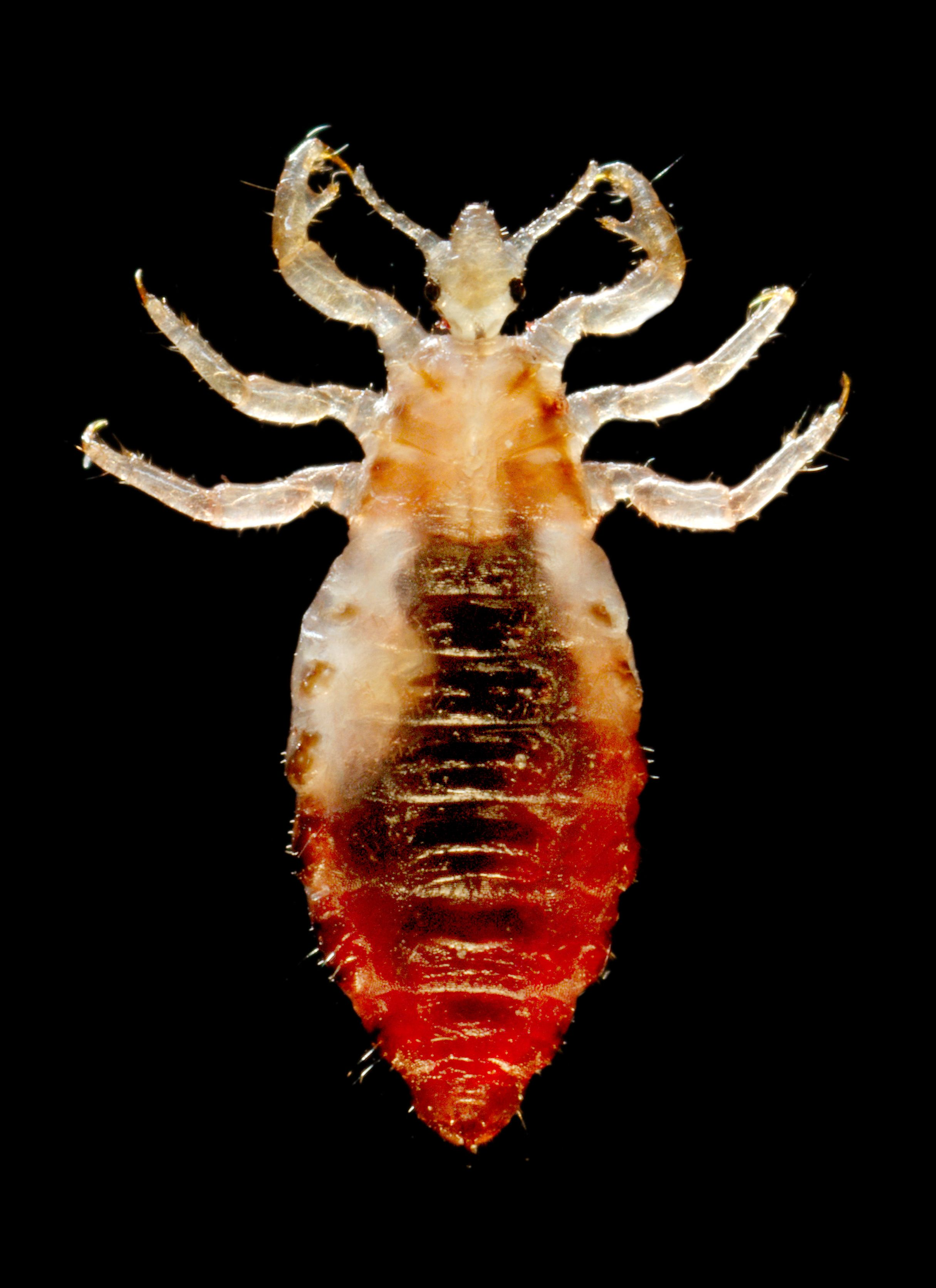
- Pediculosis corporis is caused by the body louse, Pediculus humanus humanus (syn. Pediculus corporis). The dark mass depicted inside the abdomen is a previously ingested blood meal.
- Specialty: Dermatology
- Symptoms: Itching
- Complications: epidemic typhus, relapsing fever, trench fever, Vagabond's leukomelanoderma
- Causes: Body louse
- Risk factors: Nearby people with body lice, poor hygiene
- Prevention: Regular cleaning of bedding and clothing, personal hygiene
- Treatment: Washing contaminated bedding and clothing in hot or boiling water, personal hygiene, pediculicide

Pediculosis corporis or Vagabond's disease is a cutaneous condition caused by body lice (Pediculus humanus humanus) that lay their eggs on clothing and to a lesser extent on human hairs.

== Signs and symptoms ==
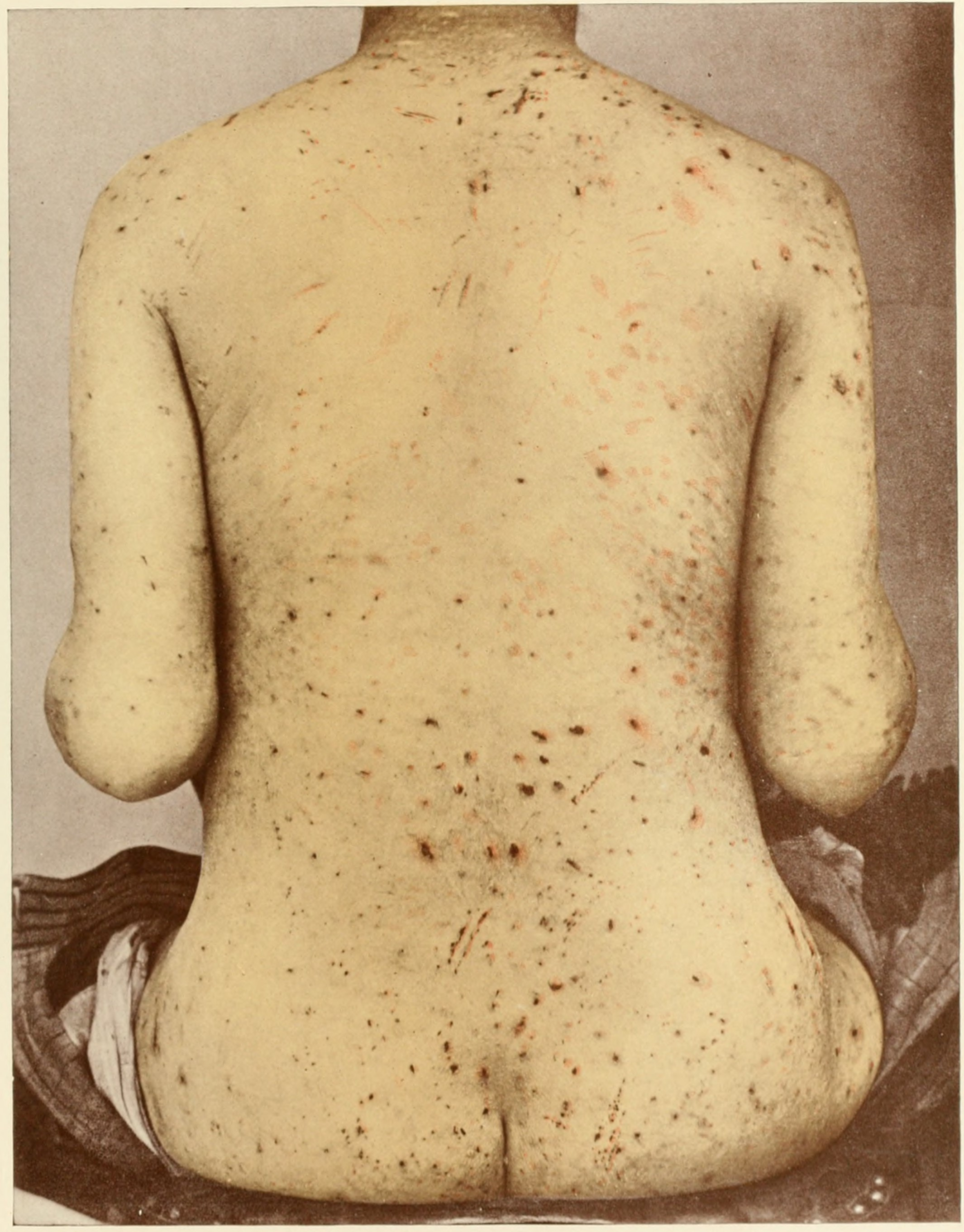
Back of patient with pediculosis corporis

Body lice bites can cause intense itching as a result of an allergic reaction to the saliva of the lice. Scratching the skin can create skin lesions, which allow bacteria and other pathogens to enter the body and cause secondary infections.

Symptoms tend to be concentrated in areas that come into contact with clothing seams, such as the neck, shoulders, armpits, waist and groin.

== Risk factors ==
Body lice are spread through prolonged direct physical contact with a person who has them or with that person's clothing, bed linens or towels. In the United States, body lice infestations are rare, typically found mainly in homeless people who do not have access to bathing and regular changes of clean clothes. Infestation is unlikely to persist on anyone who bathes regularly and who has at least weekly access to freshly laundered clothing and bedding.

Although louse-borne typhus is no longer widespread, outbreaks of this disease still occur in conditions where people live together in unsanitary conditions, such as prisons, blockades, disasters, civil unrest and war. This applies to all places where climate, poverty or war prevent regular changes and laundering of clothing.

== Pathophysiology ==
Body lice frequently lay their eggs on or near the seams of clothing. They must feed on blood and usually only move to the skin to feed. They exist worldwide and infest people of all races. They can spread rapidly under crowded living conditions where hygiene is poor (homeless, refugees, victims of war or natural disasters).

Body lice can also transmit other pathogens, especially those causing epidemic typhus, trench and relapsing fevers. They transmit these diseases as when they eat, they often release feces which contains the trench fever and epidemic typhus diseases. relapsing fever is spread when a louse is crushed and the bacteria inside its body spread to the person who crushed it.

Body lice have also been found to carry Salmonella typhi, Serratia marcescens and Acinetobacter baumannii. They have also been found to contain the DNA of Yersinia pestis, which has led to the belief that they may act as vectors for plague.

== Treatment ==
A body lice infestation is treated by improving the personal hygiene of the infested person, including assuring a regular (at least weekly) change of clean clothes. Clothing, bedding, and towels used by the infested person should be laundered using hot water (at least 130 °F or 54 °C) and machine dried using the hot cycle.

Delousing can also be practically achieved by boiling all clothes and bedding, or washing them at a high temperature. A temperature of 130 °F (54 °C) for 5 minutes will kill most of the adults and prevent eggs from hatching. Leaving the clothes unwashed, but unworn for a full week, also results in the death of lice and eggs.

Where this is not practical or possible, powder dusting with 10% DDT, 1% malathion or 1% permethrin is also effective. Oral ivermectin at a dose of 12 mg on days 0, 7 and 14 has been used in a small trial of 33 people in Marseille, but did not result in complete eradication, although there was a significant fall in the number of parasites and proportion of people infected.

Sometimes the infested person also is treated with a pediculicide (a medicine that can kill lice). However, a pediculicide generally is not necessary if hygiene is maintained and items are laundered appropriately at least once a week. A pediculicide should be applied exactly as directed on the bottle or by a physician.

Medication, insecticide or burning of clothing and bedding is usually not necessary, as the problem normally goes away with daily bathing, and at least weekly hot laundering or drying of clothing, bedding and towels.

== See also ==
- Vagabond's leukomelanoderma
- Pediculosis
- Pulicosis
- Cimicosis
- Scabies
- Flea-borne typhus
- List of cutaneous conditions
- List of human skin parasites
