= Nitpicking =

Meticulously looking for trivial errors

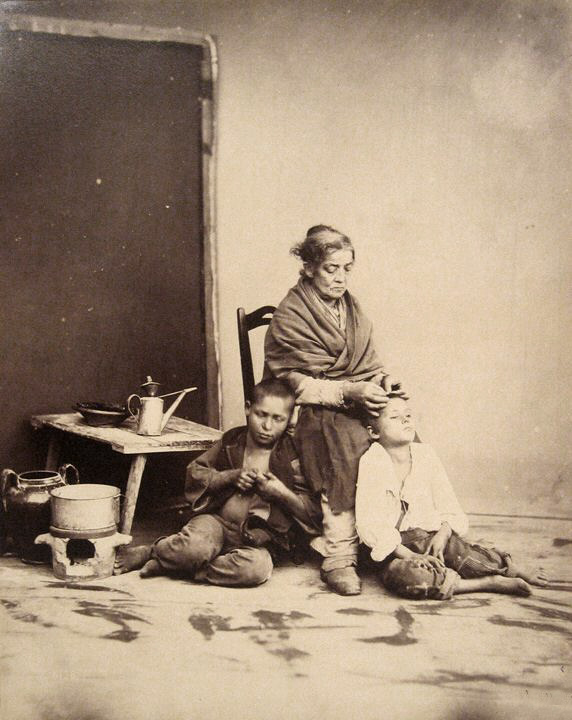
Photograph by Giorgio Sommer (1834–1914); Famille napolitaine — a Neapolitan mother searching for lice in her son's hair.

Nitpicking, a term first attested in 1956, is the action of giving too much attention to unimportant detail. A person who nitpicks is termed as a nitpicker.

The terminology originates from the common act of manually removing nits (the eggs of lice, generally head lice) from another person's hair.

As nitpicking inherently requires fastidious attention to detail, the term has become appropriated to describe the practice of meticulously searching for minor, even trivial errors in detail.

Nitpicking has been used to describe dishonest insurers and bullying employers, or even bullying family members.
