= Head lice infestation =

- Other names: Pediculosis capitis, nits, cooties
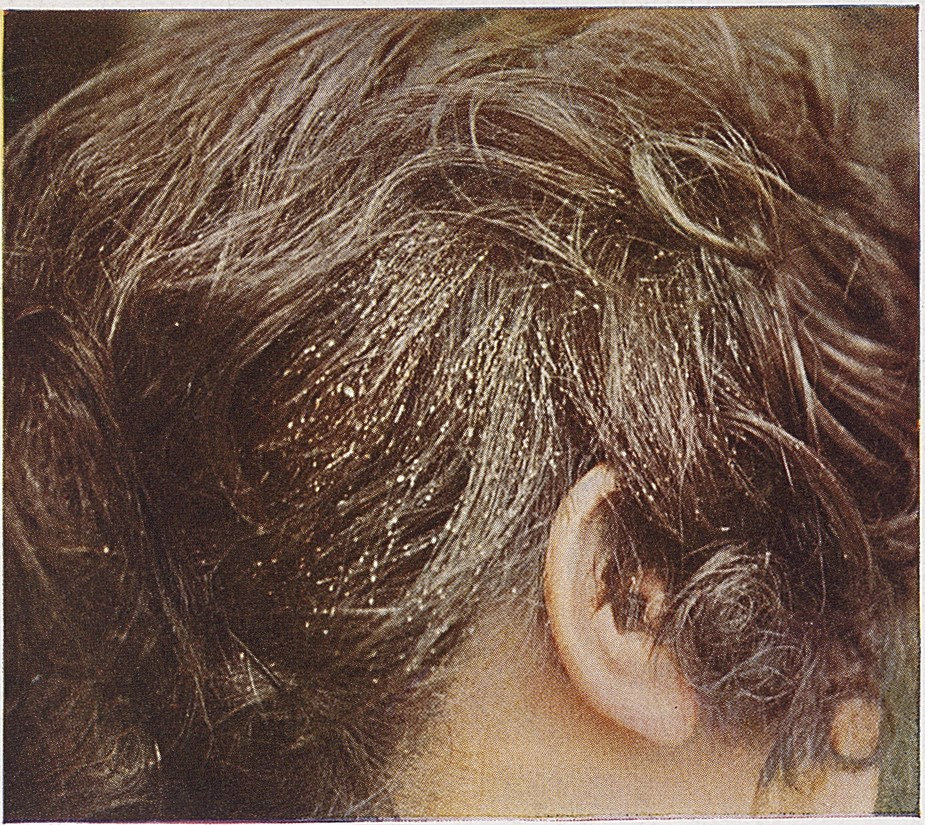
- Head lice on long hair
- Specialty: Pediatrics, infectious disease
- Symptoms: Itching that can result in trouble sleeping
- Usual onset: Up to six weeks from infestation
- Causes: Head louse spread by direct contact
- Diagnostic method: Finding live lice
- Treatment: Combing the hair with a fine-tooth comb, shaving the head, medications
- Medication: Malathion, ivermectin, dimethicone
- Prognosis: Not serious
- Frequency: Common

Head lice infestation, also known as pediculosis capitis, is the infection of the head hair and scalp by the head louse (Pediculus humanus capitis). Itching from lice bites is common. During a person's first infection, the itch may not develop for up to six weeks. If a person is infected again, symptoms may begin much more quickly. The itch may cause problems with sleeping. Generally, however, it is not a serious condition. Although body lice are established vectors of several bacterial diseases, the role of head lice in disease transmission remains uncertain. Studies have detected bacterial pathogens in head lice, but detection alone does not prove that head lice can transmit infection to humans.

Head lice are spread by direct contact with the hair of someone who is infected. The cause of head lice infestations in children is not related to cleanliness. Other animals, such as cats and dogs, do not play a role in transmission. Head lice feed only on human blood and are only able to survive on human head hair. When adults, they are about 2 to 3 mm long. When not attached to a human, they are unable to live beyond three days. Humans can also become infected with two other lice – the body louse and the crab louse. To make the diagnosis, live lice must be found. Using a comb can help with detection. Empty eggshells (known as nits) are not sufficient for the diagnosis.

Possible treatments include combing the hair frequently with a fine-tooth comb or shaving the head completely. Several topical medications are also effective, including malathion, ivermectin, and dimethicone. Dimethicone, which is a silicone oil, is often preferred due to the low risk of side effects. Pyrethroids such as permethrin have been commonly used; however, they have become less effective due to increasing pesticide resistance. There is little evidence for alternative medicines.

Head-lice infestations are common, especially in children. In Europe, they infect between 1 and 20% of different groups of people. In the United States, between 6 and 12 million children are infected each year. They occur more often in girls than boys. It has been suggested that historically, head lice infection was beneficial, as they protected against the more dangerous body louse. Infestations may cause stigmatization of the infected individual.

== Signs and symptoms ==
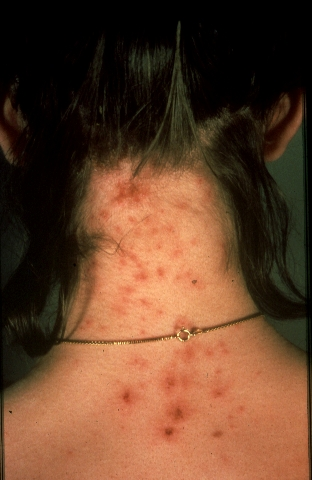
Head lice bites on the back of the neck

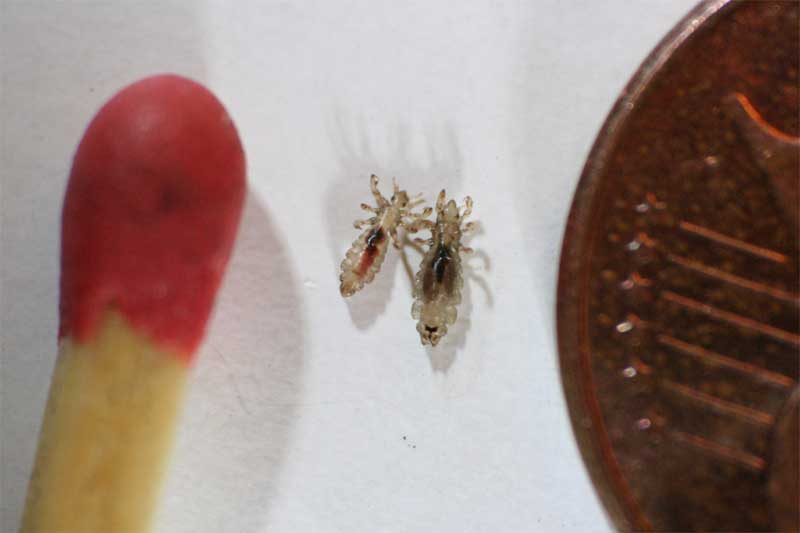
Adult male (left) and female (right) head lice

Head lice are generally uncomfortable, but typically do not constitute a serious condition. The most common symptom is itching of the head, which normally worsens 3 to 4 weeks after the initial infestation. The bite reaction is very mild and can rarely be seen between the hairs. Bites can be seen, especially on the neck of long-haired individuals, when the hair is pushed aside. Swelling of the local lymph nodes and fever are rare. Itching may cause skin breakdown and uncommonly result in a bacterial infection. Many individuals do not experience symptoms. Itching may take 2–6 weeks to develop upon first infestation, and sooner in subsequent infestations.

=== Role as a disease vector ===
Body lice are known to spread several bacterial diseases, including epidemic typhus, trench fever, and louse-borne relapsing fever. The role of head lice in disease transmission is less clear. Studies have detected bacterial pathogens in head lice, including Bartonella quintana, Borrelia recurrentis, Coxiella burnetii, Rickettsia prowazekii, Yersinia pestis, and several Acinetobacter species. These bacteria have been found in head lice collected from different populations, including schoolchildren, rural communities, refugees, people experiencing homelessness, and patients in areas where louse-borne diseases occur. However, finding bacteria in head lice does not prove that head lice can spread disease to humans. To be considered a disease vector, the louse would need to carry the pathogen and transmit it to a person under natural conditions. Current evidence suggests that head lice may have some vector potential, but further experimental and epidemiological studies are needed to determine whether they can actively transmit bacterial pathogens.

== Transmission ==
Head lice spread through direct contact of the head of an infested person with the head of a non-infested person. The presence of live lice indicates an active infestation, while the presence of nits indicates a past or currently inactive infection with the potential to become active. Head lice do not leap or spring as a means to transfer to their hosts; instead, they move by crawling. Transmission by indirect contact (e.g. sharing bedding, clothing, headwear, the same comb) is much less common. The cause of head lice infestations is not related to cleanliness. Neither hair length nor how often the hair is brushed affects the risk of infection. Pets are not vectors for head lice.

Other lice that infest humans are the body louse and the crab louse (aka pubic lice). The claws of these three species are adapted to attach to specific hair diameters. Pubic lice are most often spread by sexual contact with an infested person. Body lice can be found on clothing and they are not known to burrow into the skin.

== Diagnosis ==
Head louse crawling on a hairbrush

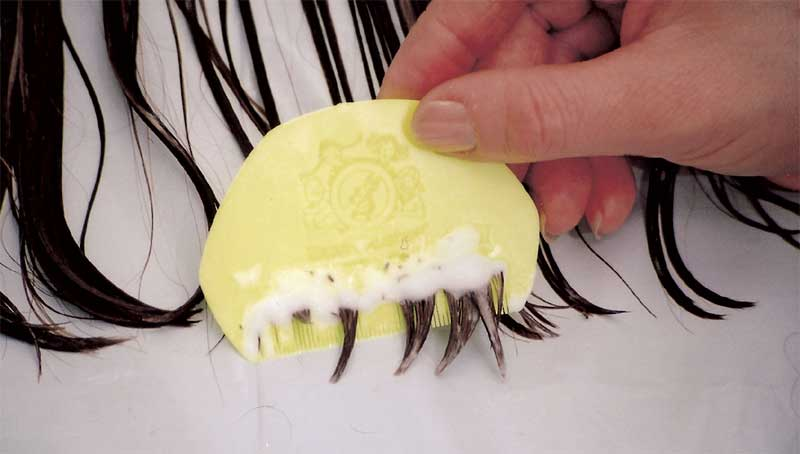
Lice comb (Bug Buster) wet combing with conditioner for diagnosis and treatment. Head lice can be seen in foam.

The condition is diagnosed by finding live lice and unhatched eggs in the hair. Finding empty eggs is not enough. Dandruff, lint, sand, hair casts, and dried hairspray can be mistaken for eggs and nits. This is made easier by using a magnifying glass or running a comb through the child's wet hair, the latter of which is the most assured method of diagnosis and can be used to monitor treatment. In questionable cases, a child can be referred to a health professional. However, head lice infestation is commonly overdiagnosed, with extinct infestations being mistaken for active ones. Infestations are only considered extinct if nits are more than 0.25 inches away from the scalp and nymphs and adult lice are absent. As a result, lice-killing treatments are more often used on non-infested than infested children. The use of a louse comb is the most effective way to detect living lice. With both methods, special attention should be paid to the area near the ears and the nape of the neck.

The presence of nits alone, however, is not an accurate indicator of an active head louse infestation. Generally, white nits are empty egg casings, while brown nits may still contain viable louse larvae. One way to determine the nit is to squeeze it between two fingernails; it produces a characteristic snapping sound as the egg bursts. Children with nits on their hair have a 35–40% chance of also being infested with living lice and eggs. If lice are detected, the entire family needs to be checked (especially children up to the age of 13 years) with a louse comb, and only those who are infested with living lice should be treated. As long as no living lice are detected, the child should be considered negative for head louse infestation. Accordingly, a child should be treated with a pediculicide only when living lice are detected on their hair (not because they have louse eggs/nits on their hair and not because the scalp is itchy).

== Prevention ==
Head lice prevention focuses on limiting direct hair-to-hair contact, which is the main way lice spread. This is especially relevant in schools, camps, sports, sleepovers, and other settings where children are in close contact. Sharing items that touch the head or hair, such as hats, scarves, hair accessories, combs, brushes, and towels, is also discouraged. Combs and brushes used by an affected person can be soaked in hot water of at least 130°F for 5 to 10 minutes. Clothing, towels, bedding, and other washable items used during the two days before treatment can be washed in hot water at 130°F and dried on high heat. Fabric or household items that cannot be washed or dry cleaned can be sealed in a plastic bag for two weeks. Extensive household cleaning is not usually needed. Vacuuming areas where the affected person sat or lay may help, but fumigant sprays and foggers are not recommended because they are unnecessary and may be harmful.

== Treatment ==
There are several treatments effective for head lice. These methods include combs, shaving, medical creams, and hot air. Medical creams usually require two treatments a week apart. Head lice are not justification to keep children home from school as the risk of spread is low.

=== Mechanical measures ===
Wet combing (mechanical removal of lice through combing wet hair) can be used as a treatment measure for individuals who are too young for pediculicide treatment, which is intended for use in individuals 6 years of age or older. Wet combing a few times a day for a few weeks may also eliminate the infestation in half of the people. This requires the use of a special lice comb with extra fine teeth. This is the recommended method for infants and pregnant women. Shaving the head can also effectively treat lice.

Another treatment is the use of heated air applied by a hair dryer. This can be particularly useful in the early stages of an infestation, as it has a very high mortality rate for eggs.

=== Medications ===
Many medications can kill lice. Dimethicone is between 70% and 97% effective, with a low rate of side effects, and is thus considered the preferred treatment. Dimethicone is a silicone oil with a low surface tension and the propensity to coat surfaces perfectly. It is thought to work not by suffocation or poisoning, but by blocking water excretion, which causes insects to die from physiological stress either through prolonged immobilization or disruption of internal organs such as the gut. There is no evidence of pesticide resistance.

Ivermectin is around 80% effective, but can cause local skin irritation. Malathion has an effectiveness of around 90%, but there's the possibility of toxicity. Pyrethroids such as permethrin, while commonly used, have lower rates of effectiveness due to the resistance among lice. Effectiveness varies from 10 to 80%, depending on the population studied. Medications within a lotion appear to work better than those within a shampoo. Benzyl alcohol appears effective, but it is unclear if it is better than standard treatments. Abametapir was approved for medical use in the United States in July 2020.

Resistance to several commonly used treatments is increasing worldwide, with patterns of resistance varying by region. Head lice have demonstrated resistance to permethrin, malathion, phenothrin, and carbaryl in several countries around the world. A previous method used to delay resistance included utilizing a rotating list of recommended insecticides by health authorities. The mosaic model is the current recommendation, in which it is advised to use one product for a treatment course, followed by a different insecticide from another substance class if the first treatment fails.

=== Home remedies ===
Tea tree oil has been promoted as a treatment for head lice; however, there is no clear evidence of its effectiveness. A 2012 review of head lice treatment recommended against the use of tea tree oil for children because it could cause skin irritation or allergic reactions, because of contraindications, and because of a lack of knowledge about the oil's safety and effectiveness. Other home remedies, such as putting vinegar, isopropyl alcohol, olive oil, mayonnaise, or melted butter under a shower cap, have been disproven. The CDC states that swimming has no effect on drowning lice, and can decrease the effectiveness of some treatments.

=== Environment ===
After treatment, people are often instructed to wash all bedding and vacuum all areas the head may have been, such as car seats, coat hoods, and sofas, but this is not always necessary, since adult lice will die within 2 days without a blood meal, and newly hatched lice die within minutes of hatching. Combs and brushes may be deloused in boiling water for 5–10 minutes. Items may also be frozen for 24 hours at a temperature well below the freezing point of water to ensure that ice crystals form within the cells of the lice.

=== Outbreak management ===
In addition to environmental management, an outbreak of head lice infestation requires synchronous treatment of all individuals who are infested and evaluation of those who have been exposed or are suspected of having head lice. Synchronous ovoidal dimethicone treatment has been shown to manage and terminate outbreaks effectively, and a single treatment is likely sufficient. Other treatment methods can be repeated 8–10 days after the initial treatment and may sometimes require a third treatment. Outbreak status and treatment effectiveness can be monitored using the wet combing method.

== Epidemiology ==
In the United States, head lice infestation occurs most frequently among children aged 3–11 years. The Centers for Disease Control and Prevention (CDC) estimates that 6–12 million infestations occur annually among children in this age group. Accurate national incidence and prevalence data are limited because head lice infestation is not a nationally reportable condition. Some studies have reported higher infestation rates among girls than boys, which may be related to differences in patterns of head-to-head contact.

Head lice infestations are common among school-aged children in low- and middle-income countries, with an estimated prevalence of 19.96% among primary school children. Higher infestation rates have been reported among girls, children with a previous history of infestation, and those living in larger households.

In Africa, prevalence estimates range from 0.6% to 79% across 27 countries, demonstrating considerable variation between regions and populations. Differences in infestation rates may be influenced by factors such as overcrowding, economic conditions, access to healthcare, and local cultural practices. Head lice infestations are especially common among children in low- and middle-income settings and may negatively affect well-being, school attendance, and academic performance. Despite their widespread occurrence, surveillance and reporting remain limited in many African countries. Growing resistance to commonly used treatments has also emerged as a challenge in some regions.

== Public-health implications ==
=== Stigma ===
Head lice infestations are notably common, as is the stigma associated with those who experience infestations. Such stigma is even evidenced in the English language as the term "lousy", an adjective that describes something as very poor, bad, or disgusting. Misperceptions of those infected with head lice include that it is associated with low socioeconomic status, poor hygiene, unhealthiness, immigration status, and homelessness. Though these negative beliefs are unfounded, they can lead to consequences for both the caregivers and the affected individual, such as social exclusion and isolation from peers, victim-blaming, caregiver strain, inappropriate or unsafe treatment practices, and missed work or school.

==== No-nit policies ====
Evidence-based guidelines from the CDC, American Academy of Pediatrics (AAP) and National Association of School Nurses (NASN) all recommend discontinuing "no-nit" policies in schools (meaning that a child does not need to be free of nits before returning to school), 80 percent of schools in the United States still maintain stringent policies that prevent children with infestations from attending. Thus, to foster a return to school in a timely fashion, these policies can encourage unsafe or harsh treatment practices, including chemicals like bleach or kerosene. Similarly, over-treatment of head-lice using pesticide-based pediculicides has been linked to increased resistance and declining efficacy of these treatments.

== Society and culture ==
- "To a Louse" (on a lady's bonnet). Perhaps the most widely known cultural reference to pediculosis capitis is in a noted poem by Robert Burns.

== Host Specificity ==
Lice infestation in general is known as pediculosis, and occurs in many mammalian and bird species. Lice infesting other host species are not the same organism as that which causes head lice infestations in humans, nor do the three louse species which infest humans infest any other host species.
