= Pesticide toxicity to bees =

Effects of pesticide on bees

Pesticides vary in their effects on bees. Contact pesticides are usually sprayed on plants and can kill bees when they crawl over sprayed surfaces of plants or other areas around it. Systemic pesticides, on the other hand, are usually incorporated into the soil or onto seeds and move up into the stem, leaves, nectar, and pollen of plants.

Of contact pesticides, dust and wettable powder pesticides tend to be more hazardous to bees than solutions or emulsifiable concentrates. When a bee comes in contact with pesticides while foraging, the bee may die immediately without returning to the hive. In this case, the queen bee, brood, and nurse bees are not contaminated and the colony survives. Alternatively, the bee may come into contact with an insecticide and transport it back to the colony in contaminated pollen or nectar or on its body, potentially causing widespread colony death.

Actual damage to bee populations is a function of toxicity and exposure of the compound, in combination with the mode of application. A systemic pesticide, which is incorporated into the soil or coated on seeds, may kill soil-dwelling insects, such as grubs or mole crickets as well as other insects, including bees, that are exposed to the leaves, fruits, pollen, and nectar of the treated plants.

Pesticides, especially neonicotinoids, have been investigated in relation to risks for bees such as Colony Collapse Disorder. A 2018 review by the European Food Safety Authority (EFSA) concluded that most uses of neonicotinoid pesticides such as clothianidin represent a risk to wild bees and honeybees. Neonicotinoids have been banned for all outdoor use in the entire European Union since 2018, but has a conditional approval in the U.S. and other parts of the world, where it is widely used.

== Classification ==
Insecticide toxicity is generally measured using acute contact toxicity values LD_{50} – the exposure level that causes 50% of the population exposed to die. Toxicity thresholds are generally set at

- highly toxic (acute LD50 < 2μg/bee)
- moderately toxic (acute LD50 2 – 10.99 μg/bee)
- slightly toxic (acute LD50 11 – 100 μg/bee)
- nontoxic (acute LD50 > 100 μg/bee) to adult bees.

== Pesticide toxicity ==
=== Acute toxicity ===
The acute toxicity of pesticides on bees, which could be by contact or ingestion, is usually quantified by LD_{50}. Acute toxicity of pesticides causes a range of effects on bees, which can include agitation, vomiting, wing paralysis, arching of the abdomen similar to sting reflex, and uncoordinated movement. Acute toxicity may depend on the mode of exposure, for instance, many pesticides cause toxic effects by contact while neonicotinoids are more toxic when consumed orally. The acute toxicity, although more lethal, is less common than sub-lethal toxicity or cumulative effects.

=== Sublethal and chronic effects ===
Field exposure to pesticides, especially with relation to neonicotinoids, may lead to multiple physiological and/or behavioral sublethal effects in exposed bees. Sublethal effects to honey bees can include disruptions to behavioral and motor functions, compromised immunity, and delayed development.

== Colony collapse disorder ==
Colony collapse disorder (CCD) is a syndrome that is characterized by the sudden loss of adult bees from the hive. Many possible explanations for it have been proposed, but no one primary cause has been found. The US Department of Agriculture indicated in a 2010 report to Congress that a combination of factors could be causing colony collapse disorder, including pesticides, pathogens, and parasites. Although pesticides were suspected to be part of the problem, a survey of healthy and CCD-affected colonies revealed similar levels of pesticides in wax and pollen.

== Bee kill rate per hive ==
The kill rate of bees in a single bee hive can be classified as:

< 100 bees per day – normal die off rate
200–400 bees per day – low kill
500–900 bees per day – moderate kill
1000+ bees per day – high kill

== Pesticides ==
All substances listed are insecticides, except for 2,4-D, which is an herbicide. Some substances are arachnicides too.

Common name (ISO)	Examples of Brand names	Pesticide Class	length of residual toxicity	Comments	Bee toxicity
Aldicarb	Temik	Carbamate		apply 4 weeks before bloom	Relatively nontoxic
Carbaryl	Sevin, (b) Sevin XLR	Carbamate	High risk to bees foraging even 10 hours after spraying; 3 – 7 days (b) 8 hours @ 1.5 lb/acre (1681 g/Ha) or less.	Bees poisoned with carbaryl can take 2–3 days to die, appearing inactive as if cold. Sevin should never be sprayed on flowering crops, especially if bees are active and the crop requires pollination. Less toxic formulations exist.	Highly toxic
Carbofuran	Furadan	Carbamate	7 – 14 days	U.S. Environmental Protection Agency ban on use on crops grown for human consumption (2009) carbofuran (banned in granular form)	Highly toxic
Methomyl	Lannate, Nudrin	Carbamate	2 hours	Should never be sprayed on flowering crops especially if bees are active and the crop requires pollination.	Highly toxic
Methiocarb	Mesurol	Carbamate			Highly toxic
Mexacarbate	Zectran	Carbamate			Highly toxic
Pirimicarb	Pirimor, Aphox	Carbamate			Relatively nontoxic
Propoxur	Baygon	Carbamate		Propoxur is highly toxic to honey bees. The LD50 for bees is greater than one ug/honey bee.	Highly toxic
Acephate	Orthene	Organophosphate	3 days	Acephate is a broad-spectrum insecticide and is highly toxic to bees and other beneficial insects.	Moderately toxic
Azinphos-methyl	Guthion, Methyl-Guthion	Organophosphate	2.5 days	Banned in EU since 2006.	Highly toxic
Chlorpyrifos	Dursban, Lorsban	Organophosphate		Banned in US for home and garden use. Should never be sprayed on flowering crops especially if bees are active and the crop requires pollination.	Highly toxic
Coumaphos	Checkmite	Organophosphate		This is an insecticide that is used inside the beehive to combat varroa mites and small hive beetles, which are parasites of the honey bee. Overdoses can lead to bee poisoning.	Relatively nontoxic
Demeton	Systox	Organophosphate	<2 hours		Highly toxic
Demeton-S-methyl	Meta-systox	Organophosphate		Banned worldwide for toxicity to humans	Moderately toxic
Diazinon	Spectracide	Organophosphate		Sale of diazinon for residential use was discontinued in the U.S. in 2004. Should never be sprayed on flowering crops especially if bees are active and the crop requires pollination.	Highly toxic
Dicrotophos	Bidrin	Organophosphate		Dicrotophos toxicity duration is about one week.	highly toxic
Dichlorvos	DDVP, Vapona	Organophosphate			Highly toxic
Dimethoate	Cygon, De-Fend	Organophosphate	3 days	Should never be sprayed on flowering crops especially if bees are active and the crop requires pollination.	Highly toxic
Fenthion	Entex, Baytex, Baycid, Dalf, DMPT, Mercaptophos, Prentox, Fenthion 4E, Queletox, Lebaycid	Organophosphate		Should never be sprayed on flowering crops especially if bees are active and the crop requires pollination.	Highly toxic
Fenitrothion	Sumithion	Organophosphate			Highly toxic
Fensulfothion	Dasanit	Organophosphate			Highly toxic
Fonofos	Dyfonate EC	Organophosphate	3 hours	List of Schedule 2 substances (CWC)	Highly toxic
Malathion	Malathion USB, ~ EC, Cythion, maldison, mercaptothion	Organophosphate	>8 fl oz/acre (58 L/km^{2}) ⇒ 5.5 days	Malathion is highly toxic to bees and other beneficial insects, some fish, and other aquatic life. Malathion is moderately toxic to other fish and birds, and is considered low in toxicity to mammals.	Highly toxic
Methamidophos	Monitor, Tameron	Organophosphate		Should never be sprayed on flowering crops especially if bees are active and the crop requires pollination.	Highly toxic
Methidathion	Supracide	Organophosphate		Should never be sprayed on flowering crops especially if bees are active and the crop requires pollination.	Highly toxic
Methyl parathion	Parathion, Penncap-M	Organophosphate	5–8 days	It is classified as a UNEP persistent organic pollutant and WHO Toxicity Class, "Ia, Extremely Hazardous".	Highly toxic
Mevinphos	Phosdrin	Organophosphate			highly toxic
Monocrotophos	Azodrin	Organophosphate		Should never be sprayed on flowering crops especially if bees are active and the crop requires pollination.	Highly toxic
Naled	Dibrom	Organophosphate	16 hours		Highly toxic
Omethoate		Organophosphate		Should never be sprayed on flowering crops especially if bees are active and the crop requires pollination.	Highly toxic
Oxydemeton-methyl	Metasystox-R	Organophosphate	<2 hours		Highly toxic
Phorate	Thimet EC	Organophosphate	5 hours		Highly toxic
Phosmet	Imidan	Organophosphate		Phosmet is very toxic to honeybees.	Highly toxic
Phosphamidon	Dimecron	Organophosphate			Highly toxic
Pyrazophos	Afugan	Organophosphate	Fungicide		Highly toxic
Tetrachlorvinphos	Rabon, Stirofos, Gardona, Gardcide	Organophosphate			Highly toxic
Trichlorfon, Metrifonate	Dylox, Dipterex	Organophosphate		3 – 6 hours	Relatively nontoxic
Bifenthrin	Agri-Medk, Abamectin, Talstar, Bifenthrine, Brigade, Capture, FMC 54800, OMS3024, Torant (with Clofentezine), and Zipak (with Amitraz)	Pyrethroid	< 1 day RT > 1 day ERT		Highly toxic
Permethrin	Ambush, Pounce	Pyrethroid	1 – 2 days	Safened by repellency under arid conditions. Permethrin is also the active ingredient in insecticides used against the Small hive beetle, which is a parasite of the beehive in the temperate climate regions.	Highly toxic
Cypermethrin	Ammo, Demon, Raid, Viper	Pyrethroid	Less than 2 hours	Cypermethrin is found in many household ant and cockroach killers, including Raid and ant chalk.	Highly toxic
Fenvalerate	Asana, Pydrin	Pyrethroid	1 day	Safened by repellency under arid conditions	Highly toxic
Resmethrin	Black Flag Mosquito Fog Solution, Chrysron, Crossfire, Pynosect, Raid Flying Insect Killer, Scourge, Sun-Bugger #4, SPB-1382, Synthrin, Syntox, Vectrin, Whitmire PT-110	Pyrethroid		Resmethrin is highly toxic to bees, with an LD50 of 0.063 ug/bee.	Highly toxic
Methoxychlor	DMDT, Marlate	Chlorinated cyclodiene	2 hours	available as a General Use Pesticide	Highly toxic
Endosulfan	Thiodan	Chlorinated cyclodiene	8 hours	Banned in EU (2007?), Banned in NZ (2009)	Moderately toxic
Clothianidin	Poncho	Neonicotinoid		Banned in EU for outdoor use since 2018.	Highly Toxic
Thiamethoxam	Actara	Neonicotinoid		Banned in EU for outdoor use since 2018.	Highly Toxic
Imidacloprid	Confidor, Gaucho, Kohinor, Admire, Advantage, K9 Advantix, Merit, Confidor, Hachikusan, Amigo, SeedPlus (Chemtura Corp.), Monceren GT, Premise, Prothor, Winner	Neonicotinoid		Banned in France since 1999. Banned in EU for outdoor use since 2018.	Highly toxic
Fipronil	Regent, Goliath, Nexa, Adonis, Termidor, Ultrathor, Fipforce, Taurus, Combat Ant-Rid, Anthem, Clearout, Radiate	Phenylpyrazole		Banned in EU for use on maize and sunflowers since 2014.	Highly toxic
Sulfoxaflor		Sulfoximine			
Dicofol		Acaricide			Relatively nontoxic
Petroleum oils					Relatively nontoxic
2,4-D	Weed B Gon (also contains dicamba), ingredient in over 1,500 products	Synthetic auxin herbicide			Relatively nontoxic

=== Highly toxic and banned in the US ===
- Aldrin Banned by US EPA in 1974.
- Dieldrin Banned by US EPA in 1974.
- Heptachlor
- Lindane, BHC Banned in California. Banned for agricultural use in the US by the EPA in 2006.

== Regulatory policy ==
Based on a risks to bee health as identified by the European Food Safety Authority (EFSA), in April 2013 the EU decided to restrict the use of the neonicotinoids thiamethoxam, clothianidin, and imidacloprid. Fipronil was also banned for use on maize and sunflowers.

In 2015, the US Environmental Protection Agency (EPA) proposed to prohibit the application of certain pesticides and herbicides that are known to be toxic to bees during pollination periods when crops are in bloom. Seed treatments were not considered to present a risk to bee health. A modified form of these proposals was adopted as EPA policy in January 2017.

In April 2018, member states of the European Union agreed upon a total ban on neonicotinoid insecticide use, except within closed greenhouses. The vote on the proposed ban followed a February 2018 report from the EFSA which concluded that neonicotinoids posed a high risk to both domestic and wild bees. The ban had strong public support, but faced criticism from the agrochemical industry, and from certain farmers' groups.

In 2020, the EPA supplemented its policy with a proposal to restrict the use of neonicotinoids on residential lawns and turf, but otherwise confirmed that they would remain in use in the US.

== General measures to prevent pesticide bee kills ==
=== Application of pesticides at evening or night ===
Avoiding the application of pesticides directly to blooming flowers can help limit the exposure of honeybees to toxic materials. If blooming flowers must be sprayed with pesticides for any reason, they should be sprayed in the evening or night hours when bees are not in the field. The usual foraging hours of honeybees are during the daytime when the temperature is above 55–60 °F (13–16 °C).

== See also ==
- Bees and toxic chemicals
- Colony collapse disorder
- Endangered arthropod
- Fipronil
- Honey bee starvation
- Imidacloprid effects on bees
- Neonicotinoids
- Pesticide misuse
- Pesticides
- Pollination
- Pollinator decline
- United States Environmental Protection Agency
