= Sulfoxaflor =

Systemic insecticide and neurotoxin

Names
- IUPAC name [Methyl(oxo){1-[6-(trifluoromethyl)-3-pyridyl]ethyl}-λ^{6}-sulfanylidene]cyanamide

Identifiers
CAS Number	946578-00-3
3D model (JSmol)	Interactive image
ChEBI	CHEBI:133305
ChEMBL	ChEMBL2230078
ChemSpider	17626728
ECHA InfoCard	100.234.961
EC Number	807-366-8
PubChem CID	16723172
UNII	671W88OY8K
CompTox Dashboard (EPA)	DTXSID0074687
- InChI: InChI=1S/C10H10F3N3OS/c1-7(18(2,17)16-6-14)8-3-4-9(15-5-8)10(11,12)13/h3-5,7H,1-2H3 Key: ZVQOOHYFBIDMTQ-UHFFFAOYSA-N
- SMILES: CC(c1ccc(nc1)C(F)(F)F)S(=NC#N)(=O)C

Properties
Chemical formula	C_{10}H_{10}F_{3}N_{3}OS
Molar mass	277.27 g·mol^{−1}

Hazards
- GHS labelling
Pictograms	(GHS07: Exclamation mark) (GHS09: Environmental hazard)
Signal word	Warning
Hazard statements	H302, H410
Precautionary statements	P264, P270, P273, P301+P317, P330, P391, P501
- Except where otherwise noted, data are given for materials in their standard state (at 25 °C [77 °F], 100 kPa). Infobox references

Sulfoxaflor, also marketed as Isoclast, is a systemic insecticide that acts as an insect neurotoxin. A pyridine and a trifluoromethyl compound, it is a member of a class of chemicals called sulfoximines, which act on the central nervous system of insects.

== Mechanism of action ==
Sulfoxaflor is a systemic insecticide, acts as a neurotoxin to affected insects, and kills through contact or ingestion.

Sulfoxaflor is classified for use against sap-feeding insects as a sulfoximine, which is a sub-group of insecticides that act as nicotinic acetylcholine receptor (nAChR) competitive modulators. Sulfoxaflor binds to nAChRs in place of acetylcholine. Sulfoxaflor binding causes uncontrolled nerve impulses resulting in muscle tremors followed by paralysis and death.

Other nAChR competitive modulator sub-groups that bind differently on the receptor than sulfoximines include neonicotinoids, nicotine, and butenolides.

Because sulfoxaflor binds much more strongly to insect neuron receptors than to mammal neuron receptors, this insecticide is selectively more toxic to insects than mammals.

=== Off-target effects ===
Application is only recommended when pollinators are not likely to be present in an area as sulfoxaflor is highly toxic to bees if they come into contact with spray droplets shortly after application; toxicity is reduced after the spray has dried.

== Registration ==
On May 6, 2013, the United States Environmental Protection Agency (EPA) approved the first two commercial pesticide products that contain sulfoxaflor, marketed under the brand names "Transform" and "Closer", to the Dow Chemical Corporation.

On September 10, 2015 the U.S. 9th Circuit Court of Appeals overturned the EPA's approval of sulfoxaflor, citing insufficient evidence from studies regarding bee health to justify how sulfoxaflor was approved. Beekeepers and environmental groups supported the decision, saying that the EPA must assess the health of entire hives, not just individual bees.

On October 14, 2016, the United States Environmental Protection Agency (EPA) approved new registrations for sulfoxaflor, "Transform" and "Closer", to the Dow Chemical Corporation.

Previously, the Dow Chemical Corporation owned and sold these products. However, as of June, 2019, the agricultural wing of the Dow Chemical Corporation was split into an independent public corporation called Corteva Agriscience, who now sells the sulfoxaflor-based pesticides.

On July 12, 2019, the EPA announced it will allow the use of sulfoxaflor, citing new studies that show lower harm levels to bees than other available pesticides. The EPA concluded that sulfoxaflor would lessen the danger to bees since industry-backed studies assessed it dissipated more quickly and required few applications than other pesticides. On December 21, 2022, the US 9th Circuit Court of Appeals ruled that the EPA broke the law in allowing new uses of sulfoxaflor because it failed to assess its risks to endangered species nor give the public a chance to comment on the decision. The court then ordered the EPA to allow the public 180 days to comment on expanding the uses of sulfoxaflor.

The California registration for sulfoxaflor was overturned following a lawsuit filed in 2020 against the state's Department of Pesticide Regulation by beekeepers and environmental groups.

Sulfoxaflor is currently registered in 47 countries, including US, Canada, Mexico, Argentina, Chile, India, China and Australia. The registration of Closer and Transform in France was overturned by a court decision in November, 2017.

== See also ==
- Imidacloprid effects on bees
- Insecticide
- Neonicotinoid
- Pesticide toxicity to bees
