= Roach bait =

Form of pest control against cockroaches

Roach bait is a pest control method used for the extermination of cockroaches in indoor locations. This method of pest control exploits the cannibalistic and coprophagic tendencies of cockroaches.

== Cockroach infestations ==
=== Secondary transmission of toxic baits ===
Cockroaches eat the feces of other roaches and they feed on each other. After consuming a lethal dose of a residual bait insecticide known to have delayed toxicant activity, cockroaches return to the harborage where they excrete feces. The insecticide-laden feces, fluids and eventual carcass, can contain sufficient residual pesticide to kill others in the same nesting site. As the roach staggers around for hours or even days, it infects other roaches in the nest, with toxicant transfer through feces, which then go on to infect others. This secondary transmission occurs through direct contact with, or ingestion of, traces of baits dispersed in the environment by contaminated cockroaches. These traces were either deposited by “trampling” in the environment or on dead contaminated cockroaches. The cascading effect goes on to wipe out whole colonies from indirect exposure by contact with the corpses, feces, or harborages of cockroaches previously exposed.

Such nests, when contaminated with sufficient residual pesticide via feces, secretions, exuviae, or corpses provide an important reservoir of pesticide, which would be available to infect other species. Residual pesticides by virtue of their efficacy against cockroaches, their deployment in secure bait stations, and the way in which the active toxicant is transmitted to cockroaches that have not fed on the baits, offer an effective and environmentally compatible way of controlling cockroaches.

=== Active ingredients ===
An active ingredient (AI) is the substance in a pesticide that is biologically active. To control colonies the roach bait may contain the active ingredients Fipronil .05% or Hydramethylnon 2%. Also there are indoxacarb versions. Residual pesticides turn the infected cockroaches and their fluids into bait themselves. These slow-acting poisons, when mixed with a bait, allow the poisoned insect time to return to the colony or harborage and infect others.

==== Fipronil ====
The active ingredient Fipronil .05% disrupts the insect central nervous system, leading to the cockroach’s death in 6 to 24 hours. Cockroaches nestling together transfer insecticide to one another by touch. Fipronil acts as an insecticide with contact, and stomach action. It is sparingly soluble in water and is stable at normal temperatures for one year. Fipronil is an extremely active molecule and is a potent disruptor of the insect central nervous system.

Fipronil bait is more effective and kills faster than Hydramethylnon. Mortality rates caused by secondary transmission are higher for Fipronil bait than for Hydramethylnon bait. Fipronil is a "Group C - possible human carcinogen" and has caused tumors in rats, particularly thyroid tumors.

==== Hydramethylnon ====
The active ingredient Hydramethylnon 2% used as an insecticide in the form of bait for cockroaches leading to death in 2–4 days. Hydramethylnon inhibits mitochondrial energy production and has delayed action, with death generally not occurring for at least 24 hrs after consumption of the bait. After a single feeding, there are no immediate symptoms of poisoning, but within a few hours, the insects become lethargic and stop eating. This condition progresses until the insects die within 24 to 72 hours.

Hydramethylnon kills insects by disrupting energy production in their cells. Hydramethylnon is a slow-acting stomach poison (delayed toxicity) that does not need to be eaten to be effective. It is toxic to cockroaches both by topical application and by ingestion. Hydramethylnon residues are much less active against cockroaches by contact than by ingestion. A slow-acting poison is desirable, so they live long enough to return to the colony to share it with other cockroaches. In this way cockroaches that have eaten Hydramethylnon infect other cockroaches that have not had direct exposure to the baits. Hydramethylnon is known to cause cancer in rats, particularly uterine and adrenal tumours and lung cancer.

==== Indoxacarb ====
The Indoxacarb pesticide while slightly more toxic, is professional grade and more effective than previously mentioned roach baits.

=== Boric acid ===
Boric acid is not a bait in the dry form, but rather broadcast as a dust, that is both a toxin and a desiccant. Boric acid is often formulated into a paste. Roach attractants are mixed with the boric acid. It is similar in consistency to toothpaste.

Boric acid roach baits consist of a proprietary blend of attractants. These products are often sold at exterminator or pest supply houses. They are sold at most hardware stores and some big box home improvement or retail stores. Boric acid is harmful if taken in large quantities to humans, children and pets.

== Bait placement ==
Cockroaches tend to live in groups with fellow cockroaches in the darkest shelters available. They instinctively choose darker over more illuminated areas. Cockroaches will settle in if a place is dimly lit and well populated, and will use their antennae to feel whether other cockroaches are present.

The best way to determine the extent of cockroach activity, and hiding places is to look for them at night. Cockroaches are nocturnal, the few that are seen by day were likely forced out by overcrowding; a possible sign of severe infestation. As such, it is more likely to come across cockroach feces (which look similar to black pepper) than actual cockroaches themselves. Roaches prefer crowds and darkness. Simple minded, they use just two pieces of information to decide where to go. They go where the most cockroaches are, and where it is darkest. They act as a group, and they tend to stay together.

For baiting to be effective, proper placement and techniques are a must. Baits should be used as close to the nest as possible. A bait just 50 cm further away from a nest can reduce the amount of bait eaten by half. If the same amount of bait is used to cover two areas, the area with the greater number of traps will have most bait eaten. One should avoid spraying insecticides in baited areas, as that can cause the bait to become contaminated, thus the roaches would likely avoid consuming it. Baits, gels and Insect Growth Regulators can be useful in many cases.

Bait placed in the open, away from a wall, is essentially non-effective because cockroaches are less likely to locate it. Twice as much food per day was consumed when it was next to a nest rather than 50 cm away. A small quantity of bait in many locations provides better control than large quantities in a few locations.
