= Dimethoate =

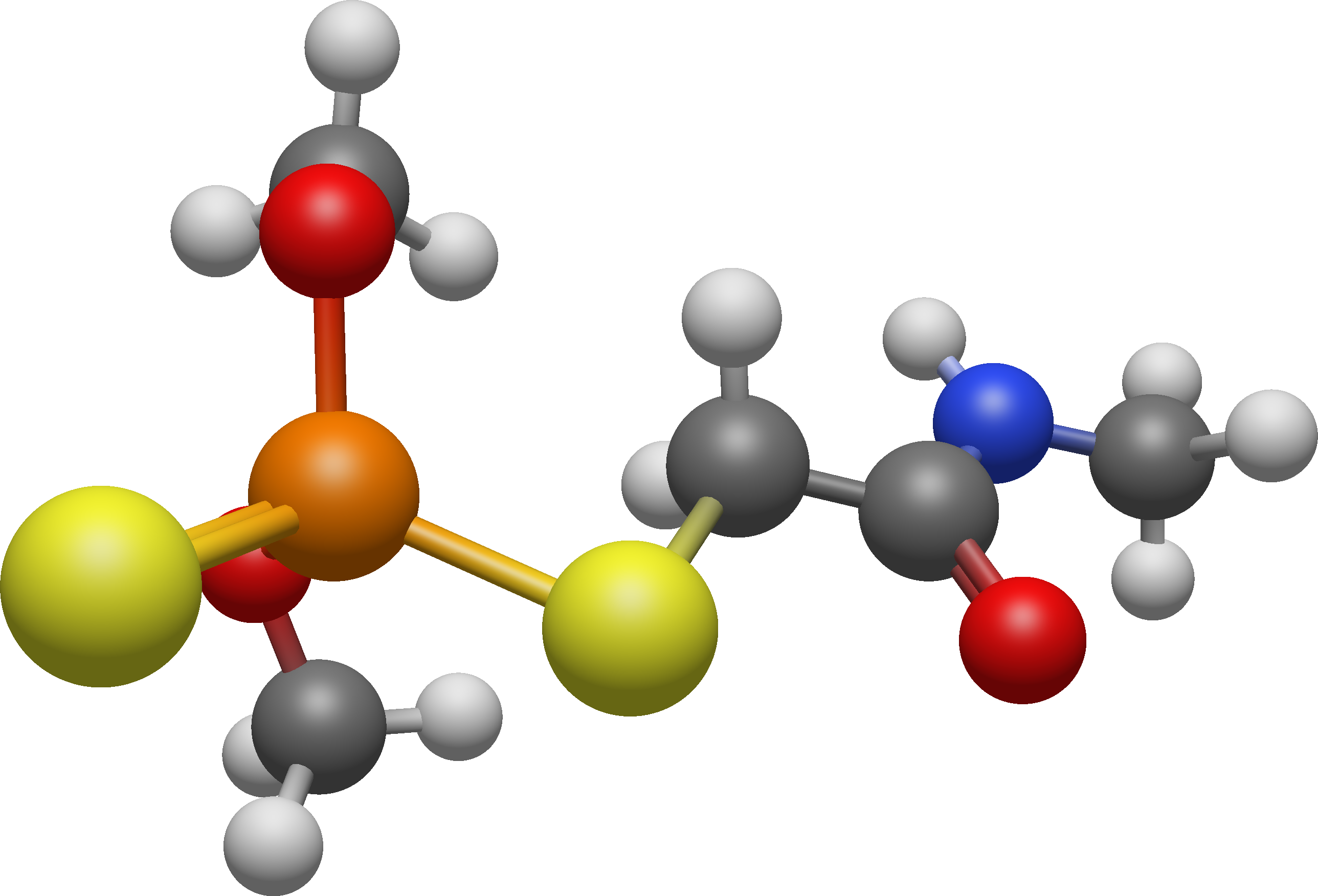

Names
- Preferred IUPAC name O,O-Dimethyl S-[2-(methylamino)-2-oxoethyl] phosphorodithioate
- Other names O,O-dimethyl S-methylcarbamoylmethyl phosphorodithioate Phosphorodithioic acid, O,O-Dimethyl S-(2-(methylamino)-2-oxoethylyl)ester

Identifiers
CAS Number	60-51-5
3D model (JSmol)	Interactive image
ChEBI	CHEBI:34714
ChEMBL	ChEMBL993408
ChemSpider	2973
ECHA InfoCard	100.000.437
KEGG	C14326
PubChem CID	3082
UNII	W6U08B045O
CompTox Dashboard (EPA)	DTXSID7020479
- InChI: InChI=1S/C5H12NO3PS2/c1-6-5(7)4-12-10(11,8-2)9-3/h4H2,1-3H3,(H,6,7) Key: MCWXGJITAZMZEV-UHFFFAOYSA-N; InChI=1/C5H12NO3PS2/c1-6-5(7)4-12-10(11,8-2)9-3/h4H2,1-3H3,(H,6,7) Key: MCWXGJITAZMZEV-UHFFFAOYAB
- SMILES: O=C(NC)CSP(=S)(OC)OC

Properties
Chemical formula	C_{5}H_{12}NO_{3}PS_{2}
Molar mass	229.26 g/mol
Appearance	Grey-white crystalline solid
Density	1.3 g/cm^{3}, solid
Melting point	43 to 45 °C (109 to 113 °F; 316 to 318 K)
Boiling point	117 °C (243 °F; 390 K) at 10 Pa
Solubility in water	2.5 g/100 ml

Hazards
- Occupational safety and health (OHS/OSH)
Main hazards	Highly toxic
- GHS labelling
Pictograms	(GHS07: Exclamation mark)
Hazard statements	H302, H312
Precautionary statements	P280
Flash point	107 °C (225 °F; 380 K)
Safety data sheet (SDS)	External MSDS

Related compounds
Related organophosphates	malathion
- Except where otherwise noted, data are given for materials in their standard state (at 25 °C [77 °F], 100 kPa). verify (what is ?) Infobox references

Dimethoate is a widely used organophosphate insecticide and acaricide. It was patented and introduced in the 1950s by American Cyanamid. Like other organophosphates, dimethoate is an acetylcholinesterase inhibitor which disables cholinesterase, an enzyme essential for central nervous system function. It acts both by contact and through ingestion. It is readily absorbed and distributed throughout plant tissues, and is degraded relatively rapidly. One of the breakdown products of dimethoate is omethoate, a potent cholinesterase inhibitor, is ten times more toxic than its parent compound.

== Uses ==
Dimethoate is a general use insecticide for combatting insects such as aphids, mites, beetles, weevils, and leafhoppers. Dimethoate is formulated as emulsifiable concentrates or wettable powders to be applied primarily as foliar sprays. The majority of the approximately 800.000 kg (1.8 million pounds) of dimethoate used annually in the U.S. is accounted for by applications on alfalfa, wheat, cotton, and corn crops. In 2005, dimethoate usage was cancelled in the U.S. for use on apples, broccoli raab, cabbage, collards, grapes, head lettuce, and spinach due to being identified as significant dietary risk contributors. Dimethoate also has applications as a form of botfly and mite control in livestock. As of 2000, dimethoate is cancelled for usage in residential and non-agriculture applications in the U.S

== Environment ==
Dimethoate is relatively non-persistent, but highly mobile in the environment due to its high solubility in water and low adsorption in soil. The half-life of dimethoate in soil has been shown to range from 2.5 to 31 days depending on the type of soil and its moisture content. The half-life of dimethoate is shorter in moist soil due the action of microbial degradation. Breakdown of dimethoate by hydrolysis in water is highly dependent on temperature and pH, with the half-life ranging from 12 to 423 days.

== Health effects ==
=== Routes of exposure ===
Exposure of the general population to dimethoate and its breakdown product omethoate can happen through consumption of contaminated food or water. Workers involved in the application or manufacture of dimethoate are typically exposed through contact with skin, or through inhalation of aerosols and dust.

=== Acute exposure in humans ===
In mammals, dimethoate has an LD50 of 150 mg/kg bodyweight in mice and 400 mg/kg bodyweight in rats. Acute exposure through oral, dermal, or inhalation routes can cause symptoms such as diarrhea, nausea, sweating, blurred vision, difficulty breathing, and slowed heartbeat. Relapse situations where the patient appears to have stabilized before getting worse have been associated with higher exposure doses. Respiratory ailments, cholinesterase inhibitor exposure, impaired cholinesterase production, or liver malfunction can play a role in potentiating toxicity.

=== Chronic exposure in humans ===
Chronic exposure to dimethoate can result in symptoms such as disorientation, irritability, impaired memory and concentration, nightmare, and speech difficulties. Chronic exposure as also been associated with nausea, loss of appetite, and malaise. Under normal conditions the chances of teratogenic, mutagenic, or carcinogenic effects from chronic exposure are low.

== Fruit fly control efforts ==
The Queensland fruit fly, or Bactrocera tryoni, is a tephritid fly species that has caused more than $28.5 million a year in damage to Australian fruit crops. In order to combat infestation, farmers treated crops with dimethoate and fenthion. In 2011 the Australian Pesticides and Veterinary Medicines Authority (APVMA) banned the use of dimethoate containing products on food producing plants in home gardens, as well as on a variety of fruits, berries, cucurbits, and vegetables. In September 2023, due to concerns that dimethoate and omethoate levels were exceeding acceptable maximum residue limits on avocados and mangoes, the APVMA issued a 12-month suspension notice on the use of dimethoate containing compounds as a post-harvest dip to control fruit flies on certain tropical fruits, including avocados and mangoes.

== Trade names ==
Dimethoate is sold under various trade names, including Cygon, De-fend, Destan, Rogor, Rogodan, Rogodial, Roxion, Dimetate, Devigon, Dicap, Dimet, and B-58.

== Poisoning incidents ==
In late October 2020 a Bulgarian farmer, a previous jackpot winner of the national 'toto' lottery drank a glass of the Russian B-58 brand, as of early November 2020 he is hospitalised in a comatose condition, he has a history of psychiatric issues but it is currently unknown whether the incident was accidental or intentional.
