= Cymiazole =

Names
- IUPAC name N-(2,4-Dimethylphenyl)-3-methyl-1,3-thiazol-2(3H)-imine
- Other names Cymiazol; Tifatol; Xymiazole

Identifiers
CAS Number	61676-87-7
3D model (JSmol)	Interactive image
ChemSpider	39837
ECHA InfoCard	100.057.155
PubChem CID	43714
UNII	7XR6MQQ6BK
CompTox Dashboard (EPA)	DTXSID5058143
- InChI: InChI=1S/C12H14N2S/c1-9-4-5-11(10(2)8-9)13-12-14(3)6-7-15-12/h4-8H,1-3H3/b13-12- Key: YUAUPYJCVKNAEC-SEYXRHQNSA-N; InChI=1/C12H14N2S/c1-9-4-5-11(10(2)8-9)13-12-14(3)6-7-15-12/h4-8H,1-3H3/b13-12- Key: YUAUPYJCVKNAEC-SEYXRHQNBI
- SMILES: N(/c1c(cc(cc1)C)C)=C2/S\C=C/N2C

Properties
Chemical formula	C_{12}H_{14}N_{2}S
Molar mass	218.32 g·mol^{−1}

Pharmacology
ATCvet code	QP53AA02 (WHO)
- Except where otherwise noted, data are given for materials in their standard state (at 25 °C [77 °F], 100 kPa). Infobox references

Cymiazole is a veterinary drug used as an ectoparasiticide. It is also used to control Varroa mites in honeybees.
