= Pyriprole =

Chemical compound

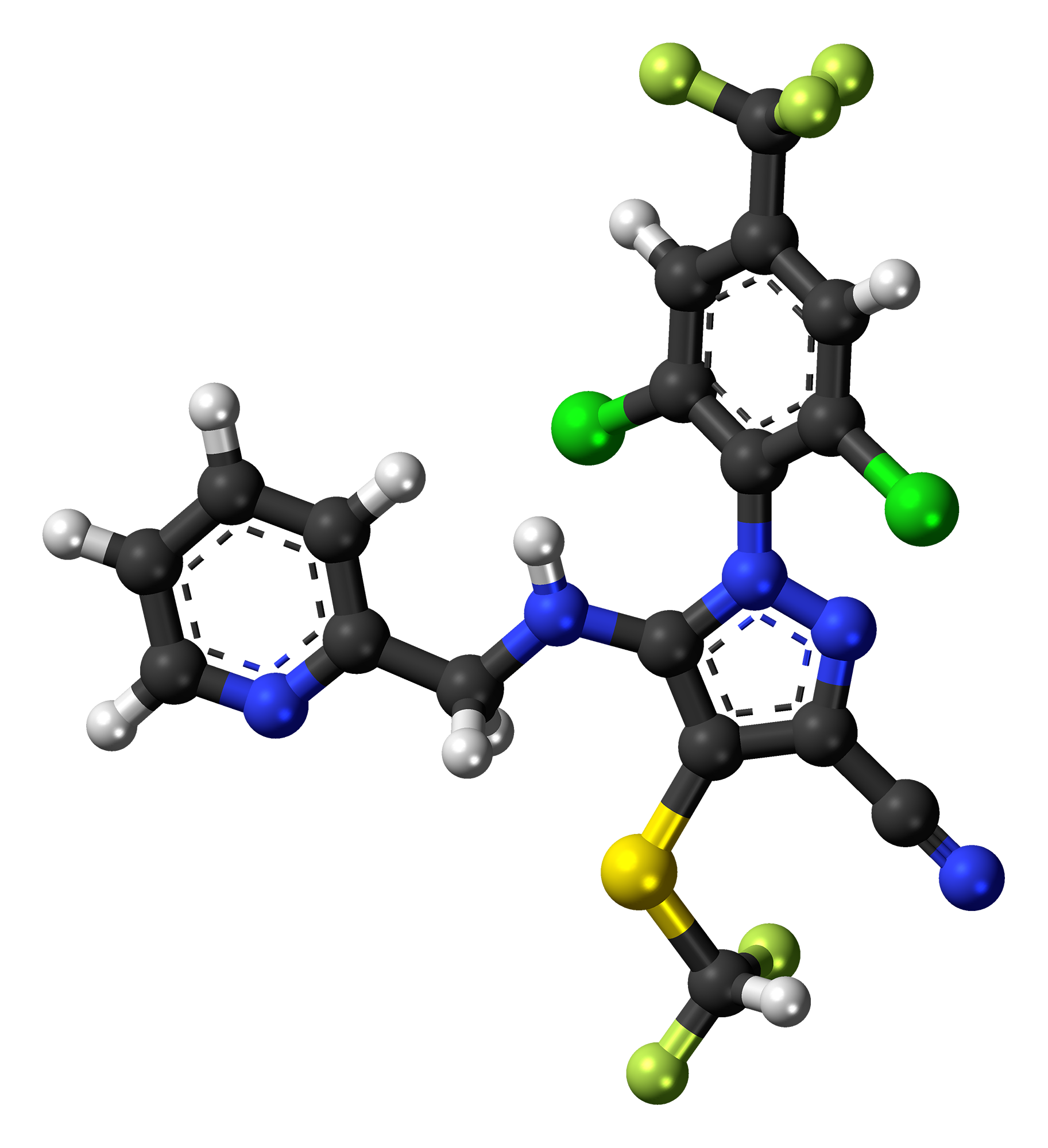

Clinical data
- Trade names: Prac-tic
- Routes of administration: Topical
- Drug class: Ectoparasiticide
- ATCvet code: QP53AX26 (WHO)

Legal status
- Legal status: EU:

Identifiers
- IUPAC name: 1-[2,6-dichloro-4-(trifluoromethyl)phenyl]-4-[(difluoromethyl)thio]-5-[(2-pyridinylmethyl)amino]-1H-pyrazole-3-carbonitrile
- CAS Number: 394730-71-3
- PubChem CID: 12056859
- ChemSpider: 11677344
- UNII: 69OX73ZVJN
- KEGG: C18580
- ChEBI: CHEBI:81845
- CompTox Dashboard (EPA): DTXSID20192613

Chemical and physical data
- Formula: C_{18}H_{10}Cl_{2}F_{5}N_{5}S
- Molar mass: 494.27 g·mol^{−1}
- 3D model (JSmol): Interactive image
- SMILES: Clc2cc(C(F)(F)F)cc(Cl)c2-n(nc(C#N)c1SC(F)F)c1NCc3ncccc3
- InChI: InChI=1S/C18H10Cl2F5N5S/c19-11-5-9(18(23,24)25)6-12(20)14(11)30-16(28-8-10-3-1-2-4-27-10)15(31-17(21)22)13(7-26)29-30/h1-6,17,28H,8H2; Key:MWMQNVGAHVXSPE-UHFFFAOYSA-N

Pyriprole, sold under the brand name Prac-tic, is a veterinary medication used for dogs against external parasites such as fleas and ticks.

Pyriprole is a phenylpyrazole derivative similar to fipronil. Introduced in the 2000s and under patent protection as an insecticide, It is only approved in the EU and a few other countries for use on dogs specifically.

Pyriprole applied as a spot-on is highly effective against fleas and several tick species. Efficacy against fleas is comparable to that of other modern insecticidal active ingredients such as fipronil, imidacloprid or spinosad. As with most flea spot-ons it controls existing flea and tick infestations in about 1 to 2 days, and provides about 4 weeks protection against re-infestations.

== Mechanism of action ==
Pyriprole is an insecticide and acaricide. It inhibits γ-aminobutyric acid (GABA)-gated chloride channels (GABAA receptors) resulting in uncontrolled hyperactivity of the central nervous system of fleas and ticks.

Parasites are killed through contact rather than by systemic exposure. Following topical administration pyriprole is rapidly distributed in the hair coat of dogs within one day after application. It can be found in the hair coat throughout the treatment interval. Insecticidal efficacy duration against new infestations with fleas persists for a minimum of four weeks. The substance can be used as part of a treatment strategy for the control of flea allergy dermatitis (FAD).
