= Phosmet =

Organophosphate non-systemic insecticide

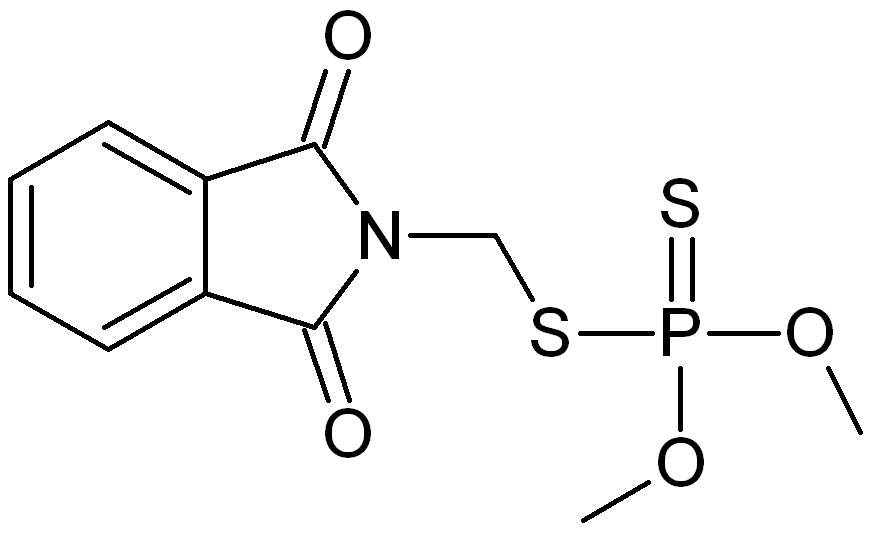

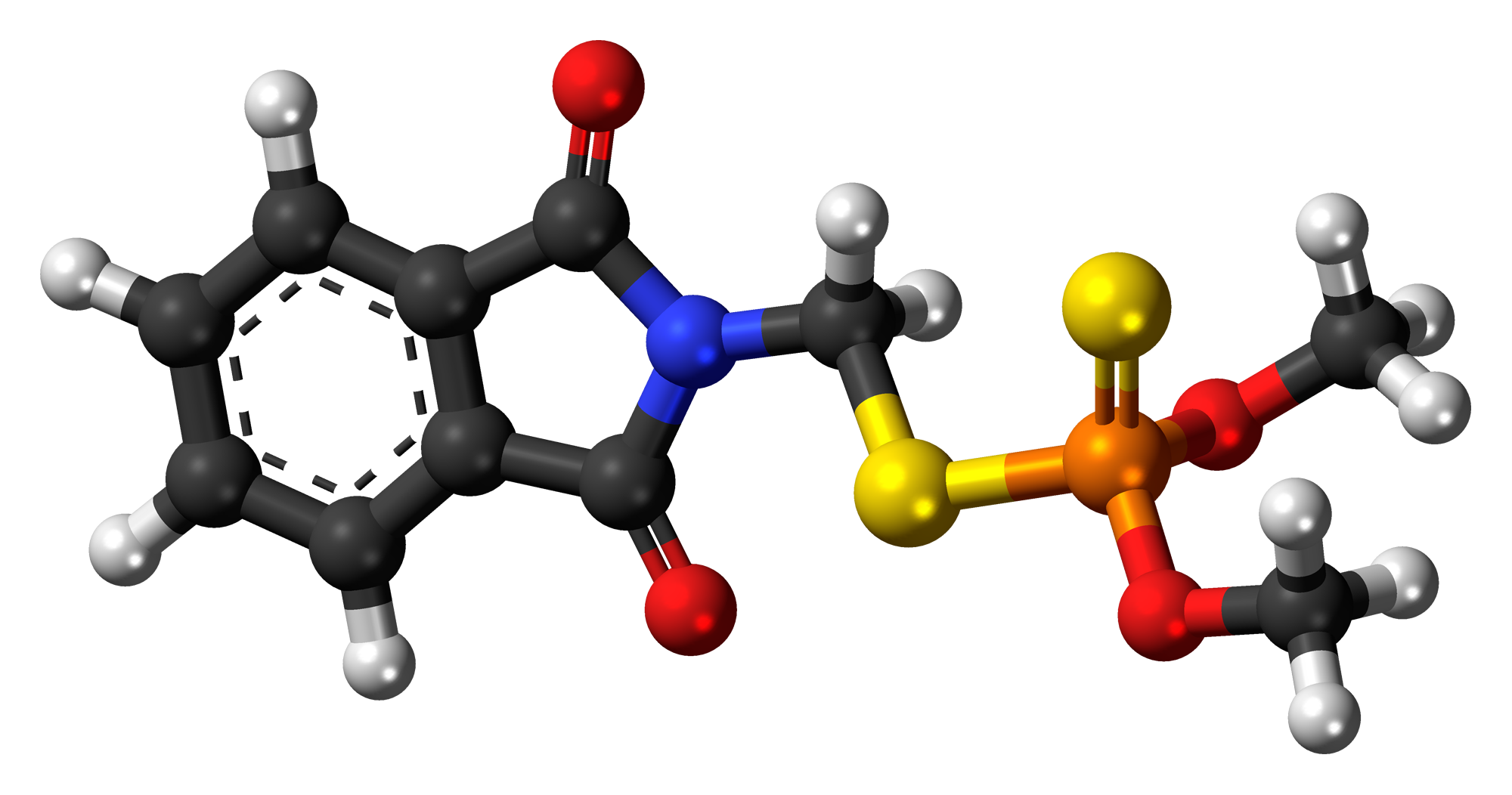

Names
- Preferred IUPAC name S-[(1,3-Dioxo-1,3-dihydro-2H-isoindol-2-yl)methyl] O,O-dimethyl phosphorothioate
- Other names Fosmet; Decemthion; Imidathion; Imidan; Phthalophos

Identifiers
CAS Number	732-11-6
3D model (JSmol)	Interactive image
ChEBI	CHEBI:38786
ChemSpider	12367
ECHA InfoCard	100.010.899
KEGG	C18756
PubChem CID	12901
UNII	VN04LI540Y
CompTox Dashboard (EPA)	DTXSID5024261
- InChI: InChI=1S/C11H12NO4PS2/c1-15-17(18,16-2)19-7-12-10(13)8-5-3-4-6-9(8)11(12)14/h3-6H,7H2,1-2H3 Key: LMNZTLDVJIUSHT-UHFFFAOYSA-N; InChI=1/C11H12NO4PS2/c1-15-17(18,16-2)19-7-12-10(13)8-5-3-4-6-9(8)11(12)14/h3-6H,7H2,1-2H3 Key: LMNZTLDVJIUSHT-UHFFFAOYAV
- SMILES: O=C2c1ccccc1C(=O)N2CSP(=S)(OC)OC

Properties
Chemical formula	C_{11}H_{12}NO_{4}PS_{2}
Molar mass	317.31 g·mol^{−1}
Appearance	White to off-white crystals
Density	1.03 g/cm^{3}
Melting point	72 °C (162 °F; 345 K)
Boiling point	Decomposes at >100 °C

Pharmacology
ATCvet code	QP53AF06 (WHO) QP53BB03 (WHO)
- Except where otherwise noted, data are given for materials in their standard state (at 25 °C [77 °F], 100 kPa). verify (what is ?) Infobox references

Phosmet is a phthalimide-derived, non-systemic, organophosphate insecticide used on plants and animals. It is mainly used on apple trees for control of codling moth, though it is also used on a wide range of fruit crops, ornamentals, and vines for the control of aphids, suckers, mites, and fruit flies.

== History ==
The first registered use of phosmet was in the United States in 1966, where it was used on a variety of crops including fruit trees (apple, pear, peach) and nut trees (almonds, walnuts) as a treatment for various pests such as the codling moth, leafrollers, and others. It has also been registered for use on cattle, swine, and dogs for treatment of lice, fleas, and ticks. It can also be used domestically for trees, bushes, and shrubs by homeowners. Phosmet is being used all over the world.

== Structure and reactivity ==
Phosmet is an organophosphate, consisting of a phthalimide and a dithiophosphate ester, with two methyl groups. The structure is a benzene ring connected to an imide, which is connected to the dithiophosphate.

== Synthesis ==
Phosmet is produced by reaction of N-chloromethylphthalimide with dimethyldithiophosphoric acid. The former, in turn, can be prepared by the reaction of phthalimide with formaldehyde and hydrogen chloride. Phosmet can also be obtained through the condensation of phthalimide with formaldehyde and conversion of the product to chloride which is reacted with sodium dimethylphosphorodithioate.

Phosmet synthesis

== Mechanisms of action ==
As an organophosphate, phosmet competitively inhibits pseudocholinesterase and acetylcholinesterase (AChE), preventing hydrolysis and inactivation of acetylcholine. Its inhibitory effects on the AChE enzyme leads to a pathological excess of acetylcholine in the body. Acetylcholine accumulates at nerve junctions, causing malfunction of the sympathetic, parasympathetic, and peripheral nervous systems and some of the central nervous system. Clinical signs of cholinergic excess can develop. The mechanism of inhibition consists of phosmet blocking the active site of the enzyme that binds the ester portion of acetylcholine.

If signs of cholinesterase inhibition are present, atropine and pralidoxime are antidotal and may be coadministered.

== Biotransformation ==
=== Absorption ===
The absorption of phosmet in the body is rapid, based on live rat studies, with almost complete absorption (84.4%) within 24 hours of administering dose. At 0.5 hours after dosing, it was observed that the peak concentration of blood and plasma concentrations are observed. The elimination of phosmet takes place in two phases. The first phase corresponds with the distribution of the compound to tissues and has an observed half life of 0.2 to 6 hours. The second phase corresponds with the direct elimination of the compound and has a significantly longer half life of 41 to 1543 hours.

=== Distribution ===
The distribution of the compound can be observed and analyzed at every dosage in a variety of tissues. The areas that display the highest level of activity can be found in the liver and the whole blood as this is where the major metabolic process takes place. The lowest level of activity for the compound can be observed in the bone and fat of the individual.

=== Excretion ===
The primary excretory pathway for phosmet is through the urine or feces, with greater than 70% of the compound being excreted through the former and about 4.5% to 9.9% being excreted in the latter; by 12 hours, more than 50% of the radioactivity can be seen to have been eliminated from an animal organism. There also seems to be a relationship between the dose given to an organism and the excretion of the compound as well the radioactivity; in live animal studies it is observed that at a higher dose, excretion of the compound is significantly slower than at lower doses. Inversely, there is a higher reported radioactivity with acute exposure rather than repeated exposure.

=== Metabolism ===
In the metabolism of phosmet, there are two major metabolites that are produced and excreted in the urine, N-(methylsulfinylmethyl)-phthalamic acid (U3) and N-methylsulfonylmethyl)-phthalamic acid (U6). The compound undergoes a series of various chemical reactions include thiophosphoryl hydrolysis, S-methylation, hydrolysis of the phtalamide ring to the respective phtalamide acid. The process ends with the sulfoxidation, via an FAD-containing monooxygenase, of the sulfur into either sulfoxide (U3) or sulfone (U6). In addition, analysis of both rat and cockroach faeces and urine in live animal studies showed that phosmet is metabolized in the liver, oxidizing the compound into phosmet-oxon. This is further validated through an in vitro study using rat liver microsomes, for which C-phosmet is incubated with said microsomes, and confirming metabolization of compound. The resulting compound to the metabolism along with U3 and U6 metabolites, is the Phosmet oxygen analogue Phosmet-oxon.

== Side effects ==
Organophosphorus insecticides are the most widely used and are most frequently involved in fatal human poisonings. They may be absorbed through the skin, and there have been accidental poisoning cases arising from such exposure. Accidental contamination of food with insecticides is also possible.

The adverse effect of phosmet are caused by the inhibition of cholinesterases. Acute poisoning leads to uncontrollable muscle movement. Which can in severe cases lead to convulsions, respiratory depression and possible death if left untreated.

An epidemiologic study on farmers which assessed their exposure from insecticides showed that farmers who applied phosmet to animals had measurable exposures, but the levels were lower than what had been seen in other pesticide applications. Inhalation exposures were insignificant when compared with dermal exposures, which came primarily from the hands. Clothing, particularly gloves, provided substantial protection from exposures.

The accumulation of acetylcholine leads to symptoms that mimic the muscarinic, nicotinic, and central nervous system actions of acetylcholine.

Muscarinic signs and symptoms are tightness of the chest, bronchoconstriction, bradycardia, and constriction of the pupils. Salivation, lacrimation, and sweating are all increased, and peristalsis is also increased, leading to nausea, vomiting, and diarrhea.

Nicotinic symptoms result from the accumulation of acetylcholine at motor nerve endings in skeletal muscle and ganglia. Thus, there is fatigue, involuntary twitching, and muscular weakness, which may affect the muscles of respiration.

Accumulation of acetylcholine in the CNS leads to a variety of signs and symptoms, including tension, anxiety, ataxia, convulsions, restlessness, insomnia and coma.

== Treatment ==
Poisoning by organophosphorus compounds can be treated and acute symptoms are able to be alleviated.

Pralidoxime can be administered to regenerate the acetylcholinesterase. It acts in place of the serine hydroxyl group in the enzyme and forming a complex with the organophosphorus moiety. It must be administered quickly after the poisoning. In addition, the physiological effects of the accumulation of acetylcholine can be antagonized by the administration of atropine.

Should atropine and pralidoxime be used in conjunction with one another, the result is a synergistic effect that is greater than if either were to be used separately.

== Toxicity ==
Phosmet is a moderately toxic compound, falling in EPA toxicity class II.

Phosmet does not cause reproductive toxicity and it is not likely to cause teratogenic effects, but the available data is not sufficient to draw a firm conclusion about the carcinogenicity of phosmet. The primary target organ for Phosmet is the nervous system.

Using the Margin of Exposure (MOE) approach to assess the risk of phosmet, the EPA deemed that there is little to no concern of phosmet having an MOE at or above 100. The primary toxicological endpoint of concern to the EPA is cholinesterase inhibition; a common toxic effect of organophosphate poisoning.

There is not a lot of data on the effect of phosmet in humans, but in rats the chemical was found to have an LD50 of 113 to 160 mg/kg through oral exposure, and an LD50 of 3160 to 4640 mg/kg through skin exposure. The table below shows the no observed adverse effect level (NOAEL) and lowest observed adverse effect level (LOAEL) of short and long-term exposure in rats.

	NOAEL	LOAEL
Short-term	15 mg/kg/day	22.5 mg/kg/day
Long-term	1.1 mg/kg/day	1.8 mg/kg/day

=== Fetal health ===
Research on phosmet's (and other organophosphate/chlorine insecticides) effect on the placenta indicate that phosmet has been found to enter the placenta and carryover to the fetus. In addition, the compound has been shown to decrease PI 4-kinase activity in the nucleus, but has no effect on membrane PI 4-kinase. Affecting PI 4-kinase activity suggests detrimental effects on different processes regulated by 4-phosphoinositides. However, more research is needed on the consequences of phosmet and other organophosphates on placenta physiopathology.

In vitro studies have shown phosmet induces apoptosis in trophoblasts, through oxidative stress.

=== Endocrine system ===
==== Estrogens ====
Phosmet has been found to give positive results in aromatase inhibition assays, indicating phosmet decreases aromatase activity.

==== Androgens ====
Phosmet gives positive results in androgen receptor binding assays, this indicates that phosmet binds to androgen receptors.

More research is needed to find the physiological effects of aromatase inhibition and androgen receptor binding.

== Safety ==
Phosmet is on the US Emergency Planning List of Extremely Hazardous Substances. It is highly toxic to bees.

May be fatal if inhaled or absorbed through skin.

The US EPA had no concern for acute dietary risk through food or water. There are however concerns for workers who are in contact with Phosmet through mixing, handling and loading who are at risk for inhalation or dermal exposure.

Phosmet was recently banned in the European Union in 2022 the reason cited being its harmful effects however its true effects on environmental degradation are still being analyzed
