= Sarolaner =

Chemical compound

Clinical data
- Trade names: Simparica
- Other names: PF-6450567
- ATCvet code: QP53BE03 (WHO)

Legal status
- Legal status: CA: ℞-only; US: ℞-only; EU: Rx-only

Identifiers
- IUPAC name: 1-[6-[(5S)-5-(3,5-Dichloro-4-fluorophenyl)-5-(trifluoromethyl)-4H-1,2-oxazol-3-yl]spiro[1H-2-benzofuran-3,3'-azetidine]-1'-yl]-2-methylsulfonylethanone
- CAS Number: 1398609-39-6
- PubChem CID: 73169092
- ChemSpider: 31458198
- UNII: DM113FTW7F
- KEGG: D10668
- ChEMBL: ChEMBL3137302
- CompTox Dashboard (EPA): DTXSID101336934
- ECHA InfoCard: 100.234.000

Chemical and physical data
- Formula: C_{23}H_{18}Cl_{2}F_{4}N_{2}O_{5}S
- Molar mass: 581.36 g·mol^{−1}
- 3D model (JSmol): Interactive image
- SMILES: CS(=O)(=O)CC(=O)N1CC2(C1)OCc1cc(C3=NO[C@@](c4cc(Cl)c(F)c(Cl)c4)(C(F)(F)F)C3)ccc12
- InChI: InChI=1S/C23H18Cl2F4N2O5S/c1-37(33,34)9-19(32)31-10-21(11-31)15-3-2-12(4-13(15)8-35-21)18-7-22(36-30-18,23(27,28)29)14-5-16(24)20(26)17(25)6-14/h2-6H,7-11H2,1H3/t22-/m0/s1; Key:FLEFKKUZMDEUIP-QFIPXVFZSA-N

Sarolaner is an ectoparasiticide veterinary medication for the treatment of flea and tick infestations in dogs and cats. Sarolaner was developed by the American drug company Zoetis and is an active ingredient in Zoetis' medications: Simparica, Simparica Trio and Revolution Plus. It is also used off-label to control sarcoptic mange and demodectic mange.

Sarolaner was initially sold exclusively under the brand name Simparica as a flea and tick prevention medication for dogs. It was then combined with moxidectin, and pyrantel. in the combination drug Simparica Trio. It is used for prevention of heartworm disease caused by Dirofilaria immitis; treat and prevent flea infestations; treat and control tick infestations with the lone star tick, Gulf Coast tick, American dog tick, black-legged tick, and brown dog tick; and treat and control roundworm and adult hookworm infections.

The feline combination antiparasitic Revolution Plus (or Stronghold Plus) contains sarolaner and selamectin and is used for prevention of sarcoptic mange, feline hookworms, feline roundworms, ear mites, and heartworms, as well as treating and preventing fleas and ticks.

In November 2024, the FDA approved a supplement that provides for the addition of the indication for the treatment and control of Haemaphysalis longicornis (Asian longhorned tick) infestations for one month in dogs six months of age or older and weighing 2.8 pounds (1.3 kg) or greater.
