= Ant chalk =

Insecticidal product resembling chalk

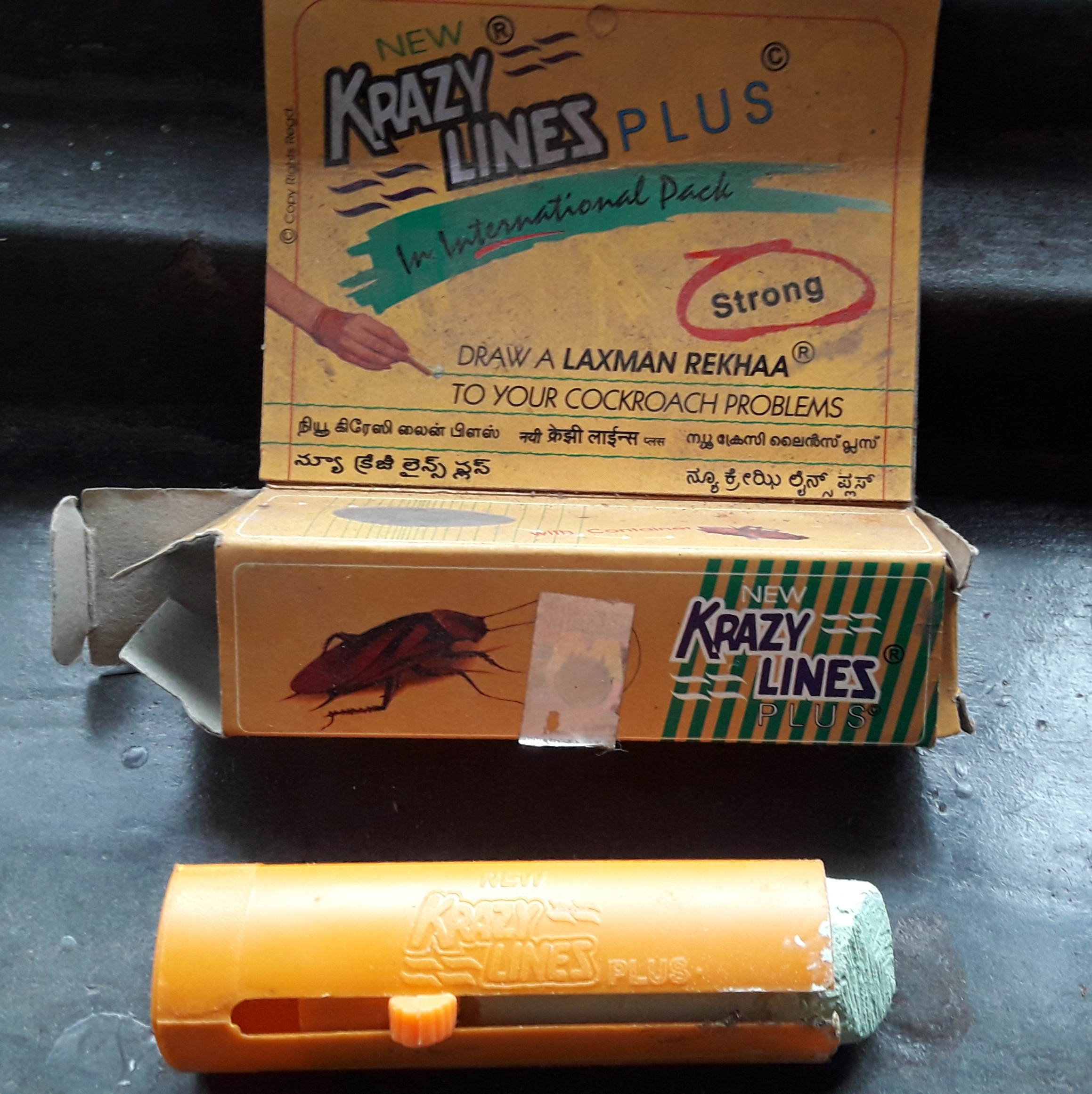
A cockroach-killing chalk with 10% cypermethrin, commonly called Laxman Rekkha in India

Ant chalk (also sold as Chinese chalk or Miraculous Insecticide Chalk) is an insecticide product designed to look like ordinary blackboard chalk. It is used to control crawling insects (ants, cockroaches) by drawing lines that act as insecticidal barriers. Though inexpensive and typically effective, it is illegal in many countries and poses serious health risks due to its extreme strength often harming unintended targets.

== Description ==
Ant chalk mimics the appearance of school chalk. Users draw lines on floors, walls, or entryways, and crawling insects that cross these lines pick up toxic residues and die from contact or ingestion.

== Active ingredients ==
Chemical testing of ant chalk products seized in the United States has revealed the presence of hazardous active ingredients:

- Deltamethrin or cypermethrin, both synthetic pyrethroids that disrupt the insect nervous system
- Occasionally, boric acid or even fipronil have been detected

The packaging often fails to list these chemicals or misrepresents the product as "harmless to humans" and "safe for household use."

== Health and safety concerns ==
Because ant chalk resembles children’s blackboard chalk and lacks proper warnings or packaging, it poses a high risk of accidental poisoning, especially among young children.

A study of Texas poison control data between 2000 and 2010 found 188 reported cases of pediatric exposure to insecticidal chalk. Although most children ingested only small quantities, symptoms included vomiting, cough, fever, drowsiness, and irritability.

Other reported symptoms include nausea, abdominal pain, tremors, allergic reactions, and (at high exposures) neurological damage or even coma.

== Legal status ==
=== United States ===
Ant chalk is not registered with the United States Environmental Protection Agency (EPA), and its sale violates the Federal Insecticide, Fungicide, and Rodenticide Act (FIFRA). The EPA has issued numerous warnings and enforcement actions against importers and distributors.

Despite regulatory actions, the product is still occasionally found in ethnic markets, online retailers, and informal street shops, especially in urban immigrant communities.

=== Other countries ===
Canada, Australia, and countries in the European Union also prohibit the sale of unregistered pesticide products. In India, cypermethrin-based chalks like "Laxman Rekkha" remain legally sold, though they are regulated as hazardous chemicals and require proper labeling.

== History ==
Ant chalk originated in China in the early 1990s and was often branded as “Miraculous Insecticide Chalk” or “Pretty Baby Chalk.” It spread rapidly in global markets due to its low cost and effectiveness. However, its legality has been widely challenged by public health authorities.

== Public health campaigns ==
Public health campaigns have sought to raise awareness about the risks of illegal insecticide chalk. In the U.S., agencies like the EPA and poison control centers encourage consumers to:

- Use only EPA-registered pesticides
- Keep chemicals away from children and pets
- Report suspicious products to local authorities

== Safer alternatives ==
Legal and safer pest control options include:

- Gel baits with boric acid or fipronil
- Enclosed bait stations
- Natural repellents like diatomaceous earth or essential oils
- Physical exclusion (e.g., sealing cracks)
- Integrated pest management (IPM) strategies focused on sanitation and prevention

== See also ==
- Pesticide regulation in the United States
- Pest control
- Pyrethroid
- Fipronil
