= ATCvet code QP53 =

Veterinary medical products classification subgroup

ATCvet code QP53 Ectoparasiticides, including insecticides and repellents is a therapeutic subgroup of the Anatomical Therapeutic Chemical Classification System for veterinary medicinal products, a system of alphanumeric codes developed by the World Health Organization (WHO) for the classification of drugs and other medical products for veterinary use. Subgroup QP53 is part of the anatomical group QP Antiparasitic products, insecticides and repellents.

National versions of the ATC classification may include additional codes not present in this list, which follows the WHO version.

== QP53A Ectoparasiticides for topical use, including insecticides ==
=== QP53AA Sulfur-containing products ===
QP53AA01 Mesulfen
QP53AA02 Cymiazol

=== QP53AB Chlorine-containing products ===
QP53AB01 Clofenotane
QP53AB02 Lindane
QP53AB03 Bromociclen
QP53AB04 Tosylchloramide
QP53AB51 Clofenotane, combinations
QP53AB52 Lindane, combinations

=== QP53AC Pyrethrins and pyrethroids ===
QP53AC01 Pyrethrum
QP53AC02 Bioallethrin
QP53AC03 Phenothrin
QP53AC04 Permethrin
QP53AC05 Flumethrin
QP53AC06 Cyhalothrin
QP53AC07 Flucythrinate
QP53AC08 Cypermethrin
QP53AC10 Fluvalinate
QP53AC11 Deltamethrin
QP53AC12 Cyfluthrin
QP53AC13 Tetramethrin
QP53AC14 Fenvalerate
QP53AC15 Acrinathrin
QP53AC30 Combinations of pyrethrines
QP53AC51 Pyrethrum, combinations
QP53AC54 Permethrin, combinations
QP53AC55 Flumethrin, combinations

=== QP53AD Amidines ===
QP53AD01 Amitraz
QP53AD51 Amitraz, combinations

=== QP53AE Carbamates ===
QP53AE01 Carbaril
QP53AE02 Propoxur
QP53AE03 Bendiocarb

=== QP53AF Organophosphorous compounds ===
QP53AF01 Phoxime
QP53AF02 Metrifonate
QP53AF03 Dimpylate
QP53AF04 Dichlorvos
QP53AF05 Heptenofos
QP53AF06 Phosmet
QP53AF07 Fention
QP53AF08 Coumafos
QP53AF09 Propetamphos
QP53AF10 Cythioate
QP53AF11 Bromophos
QP53AF12 Malathion
QP53AF13 Quintiophos
QP53AF14 Tetrachlorvinphos
QP53AF16 Bromfenvinphos
QP53AF17 Azamethiphos
QP53AF54 Dichlorvos, combinations

=== QP53AG Organic acids ===
QP53AG01 Formic acid
QP53AG02 Lactic acid
QP53AG03 Oxalic acid
QP53AG30 Combinations

=== QP53AX Other ectoparasiticides for topical use ===
QP53AX02 Fenvalerate
QP53AX03 Quassia
QP53AX04 Crotamiton
QP53AX11 Benzylbenzoate
QP53AX13 Nicotine
QP53AX14 Bromoprofylat
QP53AX15 Fipronil
QP53AX16 Malachite green
QP53AX17 Imidacloprid
QP53AX18 Calcium oxide
QP53AX19 Formaldehyde
QP53AX22 Thymol
QP53AX23 Pyriproxifen
QP53AX24 Dicyclanil
QP53AX25 Metaflumizone
QP53AX26 Pyriprole
QP53AX27 Indoxacarb
QP53AX28 Methoprene
QP53AX29 Hexaflumuron
QP53AX30 Combinations of other ectoparasiticides for topical use
QP53AX31 Spinetoram
QP53AX65 Fipronil, combinations
QP53AX73 Pyriproxifen, combinations
QP53AX78 Methoprene, combinations

== QP53B Ectoparasiticides for systemic use ==
=== QP53BB Organophosphorous compounds ===
QP53BB01 Cythioate
QP53BB02 Fenthion
QP53BB03 Phosmet
QP53BB04 Stirofos

=== QP53BC Chitin synthesisinhibitors ===
QP53BC01 Lufenuron
QP53BC02 Diflubenzuron
QP53BC03 Teflubenzuron
QP53BC51 Lufenuron, combinations

=== QP53BE Isoxazolines ===
QP53BE01 Afoxolaner
QP53BE02 Fluralaner
QP53BE03 Sarolaner
QP53BE04 Lotilaner

=== QP53BX Other ectoparasiticides for systemic use ===
QP53BX02 Nitenpyram
QP53BX03 Spinosad

== QP53G Repellents ==
=== QP53GX Various repellents ===
QP53GX01 Diethyltoluamide
QP53GX02 Dimethylphthalate
QP53GX03 Dibutylsuccinate
QP53GX04 Ethohexadiol
