= Propetamphos =

Chemical compound

Clinical data
- Trade names: Propetamphos
- Other names: (E)-1-Methylethyl 3-[{(ethylamino)methoxyphosphinothioly}oxy]-2-butenoate
- ATCvet code: QP53AF09 (WHO)

Identifiers
- CAS Number: 31218-83-4
- PubChem CID: 5372405
- ChemSpider: 4939080
- UNII: G4A07F635U
- KEGG: C18669
- ChEBI: CHEBI:38864
- ChEMBL: ChEMBL1875667
- CompTox Dashboard (EPA): DTXSID7032470
- ECHA InfoCard: 100.045.910

Chemical and physical data
- Formula: C_{10}H_{20}NO_{4}PS
- Molar mass: 281.31 g·mol^{−1}
- 3D model (JSmol): Interactive image
- SMILES: O([P@@](NCC)(OC)=S)\C(=C/C(OC(C)C)=O)C
- InChI: InChI=1S/C10H20NO4PS/c1-6-11-16(17,13-5)15-9(4)7-10(12)14-8(2)3/h7-8H,6H2,1-5H3,(H,11,17)/b9-7-; Key:BZNDWPRGXNILMS-CLFYSBASSA-N

Propetamphos is an insecticide (cockroaches, flies, ants, ticks, moths, fleas and mosquitoes) from the group of organophosphates, based on thiophosphoric acid ester. The molecule with formula is C_{10}H_{20}NO_{4}PS has a molecular weight of 281.311 g/mol.
