= Coumaphos =

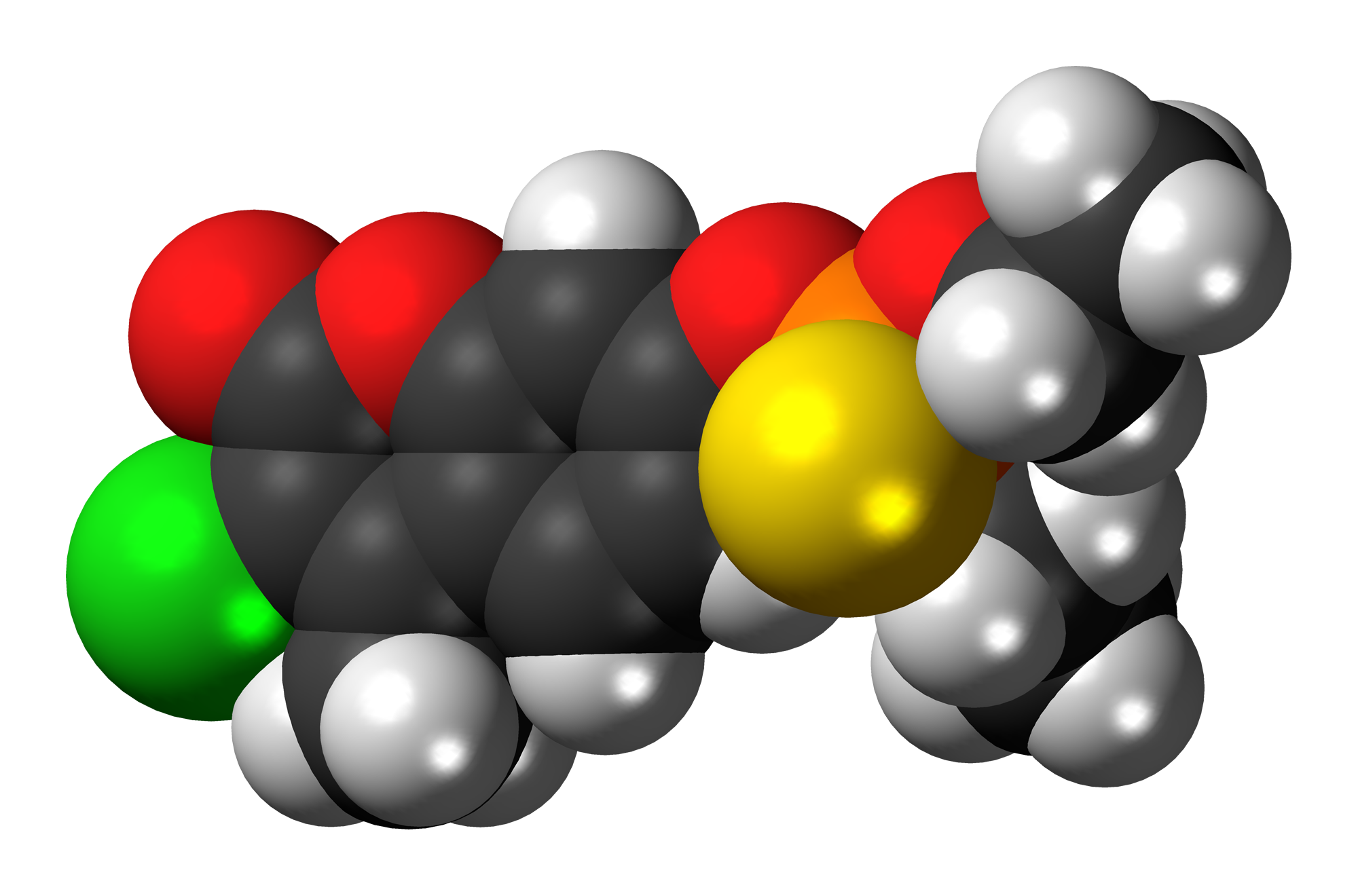

Names
- Preferred IUPAC name O-(3-Chloro-4-methyl-2-oxo-2H-1-benzopyran-7-yl) O,O-diethyl phosphorothioate
- Other names 3-Chloro-7-diethoxyphosphinothioyloxy-4-methyl-2-chromenone; Coumaphos, Meldane, Asuntol, Azunthol, Muscatox, Agridip, Asuntol, Meldone, Resitox, Baymix

Identifiers
CAS Number	56-72-4
3D model (JSmol)	Interactive image
ChEBI	CHEBI:3903
ChEMBL	ChEMBL251680
ChemSpider	2768
ECHA InfoCard	100.000.260
KEGG	D07750
PubChem CID	2871
UNII	L08SZ5Z5JC
CompTox Dashboard (EPA)	DTXSID2020347
- InChI: InChI=1S/C14H16ClO5PS/c1-4-17-21(22,18-5-2)20-10-6-7-11-9(3)13(15)14(16)19-12(11)8-10/h6-8H,4-5H2,1-3H3 Key: BXNANOICGRISHX-UHFFFAOYSA-N; InChI=1/C14H16ClO5PS/c1-4-17-21(22,18-5-2)20-10-6-7-11-9(3)13(15)14(16)19-12(11)8-10/h6-8H,4-5H2,1-3H3 Key: BXNANOICGRISHX-UHFFFAOYAO
- SMILES: S=P(OCC)(OCC)Oc2ccc\1c(OC(=O)C(/Cl)=C/1C)c2

Properties
Chemical formula	C_{14}H_{16}ClO_{5}PS
Molar mass	362.77 g/mol

Pharmacology
ATCvet code	QP53AF08 (WHO)
- Except where otherwise noted, data are given for materials in their standard state (at 25 °C [77 °F], 100 kPa). verify (what is ?) Infobox references

Coumaphos is a nonvolatile, fat-soluble phosphorothioate with ectoparasiticide properties: it kills insects and mites. It is well known by a variety of brand names as a dip or wash, used on farm and domestic animals to control ticks, mites, flies and fleas.

It is also used to control Varroa mites in honey bee colonies, though in many areas it is falling out of favor as the mites develop resistance and as the residual toxicity effects are becoming better understood.

In Australia, its registration as suited to home veterinary use was cancelled by the Australian Pesticides and Veterinary Medicines Authority in June 2004 after the manufacturer failed to show it was safe for use on pets.

The compound has been linked to neurological problems in bees, and may be a factor in colony collapse.

It is classified as an extremely hazardous substance in the United States as defined in Section 302 of the U.S. Emergency Planning and Community Right-to-Know Act (42 U.S.C. § 11002), and is subject to strict reporting requirements by facilities which produce, store, or use it in significant quantities.
