= Flucythrinate =

Names
- IUPAC name Cyano(3-phenoxyphenyl)methyl 2-[4-(difluoromethoxy)phenyl]-3-methylbutanoate
- Other names Fluorocythrin

Identifiers
CAS Number	70124-77-5
3D model (JSmol)	Interactive image
ChemSpider	46213
ECHA InfoCard	100.067.544
PubChem CID	50980
UNII	57D0GAO3RX
CompTox Dashboard (EPA)	DTXSID00860909 DTXSID0022301, DTXSID00860909
- InChI: InChI=1S/C26H23F2NO4/c1-17(2)24(18-11-13-21(14-12-18)32-26(27)28)25(30)33-23(16-29)19-7-6-10-22(15-19)31-20-8-4-3-5-9-20/h3-15,17,23-24,26H,1-2H3 Key: GBIHOLCMZGAKNG-UHFFFAOYSA-N; InChI=1/C26H23F2NO4/c1-17(2)24(18-11-13-21(14-12-18)32-26(27)28)25(30)33-23(16-29)19-7-6-10-22(15-19)31-20-8-4-3-5-9-20/h3-15,17,23-24,26H,1-2H3 Key: GBIHOLCMZGAKNG-UHFFFAOYAU
- SMILES: FC(F)Oc1ccc(cc1)C(C(=O)OC(C#N)c3cc(Oc2ccccc2)ccc3)C(C)C

Properties
Chemical formula	C_{26}H_{23}F_{2}NO_{4}
Molar mass	451.470 g·mol^{−1}
Appearance	Dark amber viscous liquid
Density	1.189 g/cm^{3} (22 °C)
Boiling point	108 °C (226 °F; 381 K) (0.35 mmHg)
Solubility in water	0.06 mg/L

Pharmacology
ATCvet code	QP53AC07 (WHO)
- Except where otherwise noted, data are given for materials in their standard state (at 25 °C [77 °F], 100 kPa). Infobox references

Flucythrinate is a pyrethroid insecticide and acaricide. It is not currently approved for use in the United States.
