= Chloramine-T =

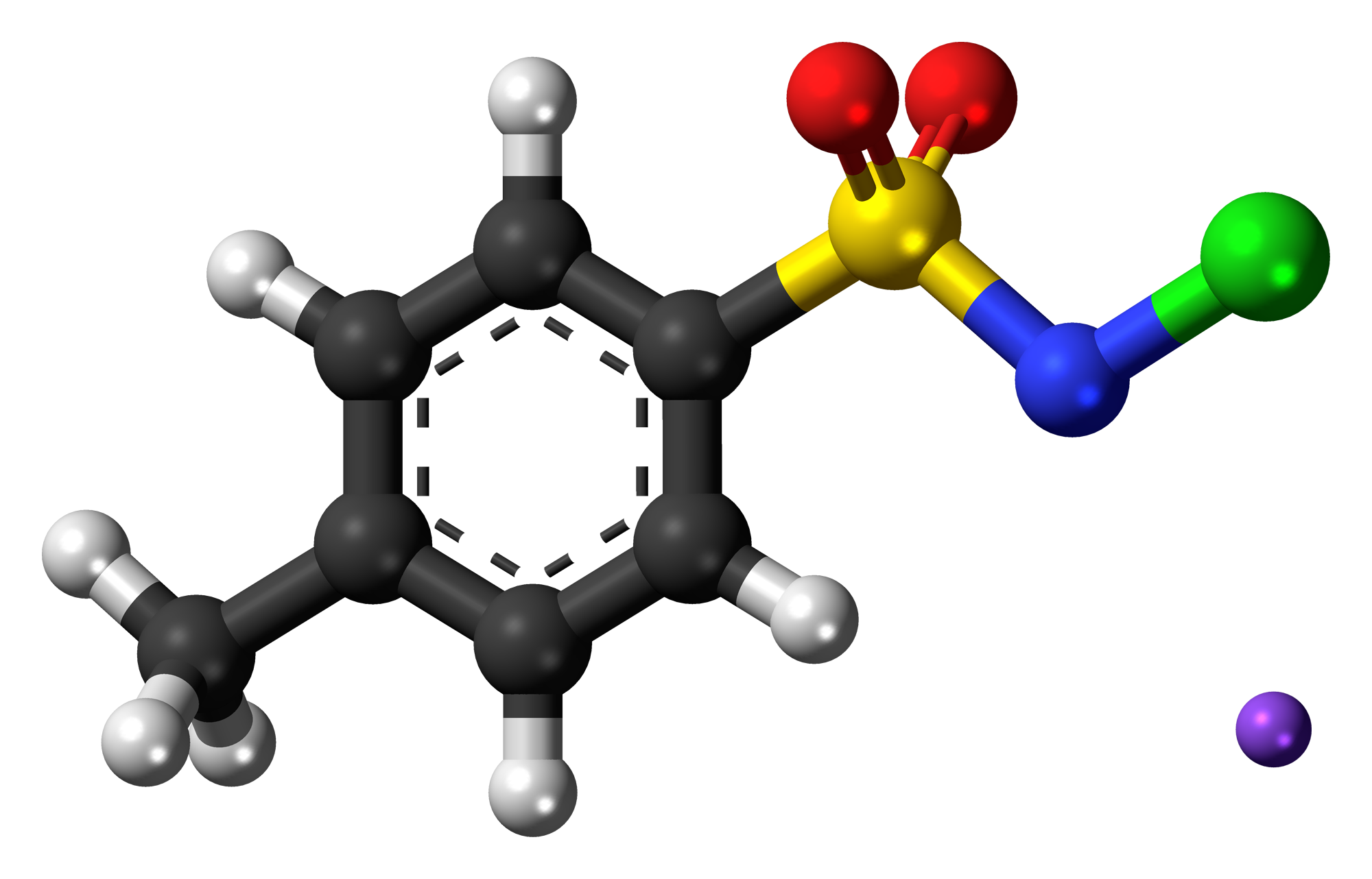

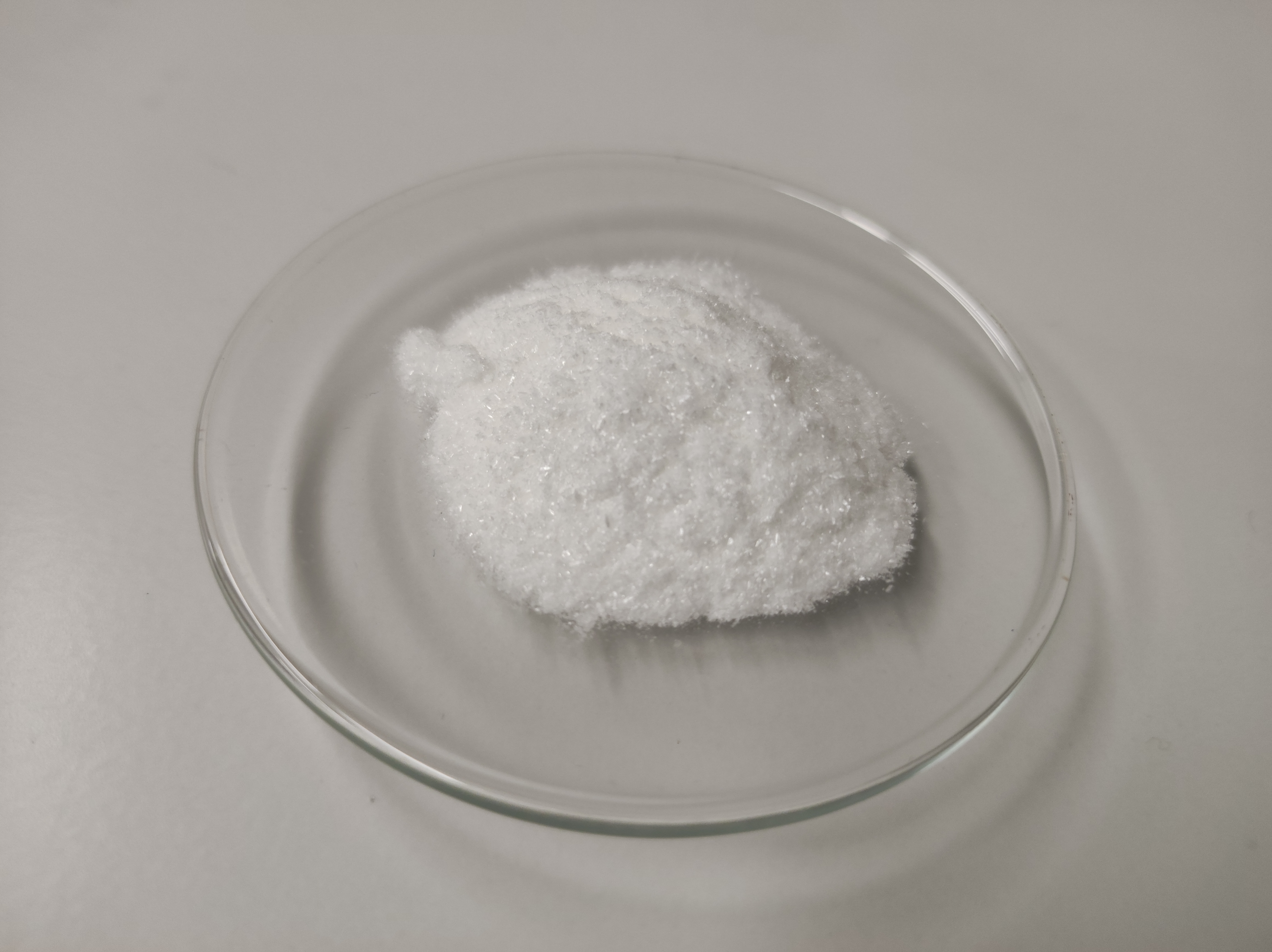

Names
- Preferred IUPAC name Sodium chloro(4-methylbenzene-1-sulfonyl)azanide
- Other names: N-Chloro-para-toluenesulfonylamide; Sodium N-chloro-4-methylbenzenesulphonomite; Chloraseptin; Chlorazol; Clorina; Disifin; Halamid; Hydroclonazone; Trichlorol; Minachlor; Tosylchloramide Sodium; N-chlorotosylamide, sodium salt

Identifiers
CAS Number	127-65-1; 7080-50-4 (trihydrate)
3D model (JSmol)	Interactive image
ChEBI	CHEBI:53782
ChEMBL	ChEMBL1697734
ChemSpider	2876055; 29119 (free acid)
ECHA InfoCard	100.004.414
EC Number	204-854-7
KEGG	D02445
PubChem CID	3641960; 31388 (free acid)
UNII	328AS34YM6; 4IU6VSV0EI (trihydrate)
CompTox Dashboard (EPA)	DTXSID6040321
- InChI: InChI=1S/C7H8ClNO2S/c1-6-2-4-7(5-3-6)12(10,11)9-8/h2-5,9H,1H3 Key: NXTVQNIVUKXOIL-UHFFFAOYSA-N; InChI=1/C7H7ClNO2S.Na/c1-6-2-4-7(5-3-6)12(10,11)9-8;/h2-5H,1H3;/q-1;+1 Key: VDQQXEISLMTGAB-UHFFFAOYAP
- SMILES: [Na+].O=S(=O)([N-]Cl)c1ccc(cc1)C

Properties
Chemical formula	C_{7}H_{7}ClNO_{2}S·Na; C_{7}H_{7}ClNO_{2}S·Na·(3H_{2}O) (hydrate)
Molar mass	227.64 g/mol 281.69 g/mol (trihydrate)
Appearance	White powder
Density	1.4 g/cm^{3}
Melting point	Releases chlorine at 130 °C (266 °F; 403 K); Solid melts at 167–169 °C
Solubility in water	>100 g/L (hydrate)

Pharmacology
ATC code	D08AX04 (WHO) QP53AB04 (WHO)

Hazards
- Occupational safety and health (OHS/OSH)
Main hazards	Corrosive
- GHS labelling
Pictograms	(GHS05: Corrosive) (GHS07: Exclamation mark) (GHS08: Health hazard)
Signal word	Danger
Hazard statements	H302, H314, H334
Precautionary statements	P260, P264, P270, P280, P285, P301+P312, P301+P330+P331, P303+P361+P353, P304+P340, P304+P341, P305+P351+P338, P310, P321, P330, P342+P311, P363, P405, P501
- Except where otherwise noted, data are given for materials in their standard state (at 25 °C [77 °F], 100 kPa). verify (what is ?) Infobox references

Chloramine-T is the organic compound with the formula CH_{3}C_{6}H_{4}SO_{2}NClNa. Both the anhydrous salt and its trihydrate are known. Both are white powders. Chloramine-T is used as a reagent in organic synthesis. It is commonly used as cyclizing agent in the synthesis of aziridine, oxadiazole, isoxazole and pyrazoles. It is inexpensive, has low toxicity, and acts as a oxidizing agent. In addition, it also acts as a source of nitrogen anions and electrophilic cations. It may undergo degradation on long term exposure to atmosphere such that care must be taken during its storage.

== Reactions ==
Chloramine-T contains active (electrophilic) chlorine. Its reactivity is similar to that of sodium hypochlorite. Aqueous solutions of chloramine-T are slightly basic (pH typically 8.5). The pK_{a} of the closely related N-chlorophenylsulfonamide C_{6}H_{5}SO_{2}NClH is 9.5.

It is prepared by oxidation of toluenesulfonamide with sodium hypochlorite, with the latter being produced in situ from sodium hydroxide and chlorine (Cl_{2}):

== Uses ==
=== Reagent in amidohydroxylation ===
The Sharpless oxyamination converts an alkene to a vicinal aminoalcohol. A common source of the amido component of this reaction is chloramine-T. Vicinal aminoalcohols are important products in organic synthesis and recurring pharmacophores in drug discovery.

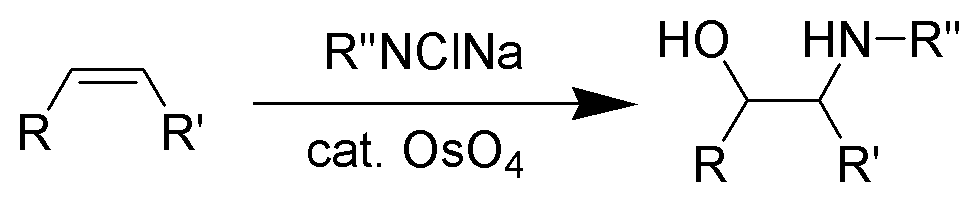

=== Oxidant ===
Chloramine-T is a strong oxidant. It oxidizes hydrogen sulfide to sulfur, and mustard gas (bis(2-chloroethyl) sulfide) to yield a harmless crystalline sulfimide.

It converts iodide to iodine monochloride (ICl). ICl rapidly undergoes electrophilic substitution predominantly with activated aromatic rings, such as those of the amino acid tyrosine. This makes it a useful reagent in combination with an iodide ion source for iodination of peptides and proteins. Chloramine-T together with iodogen (1,3,4,6-Tetrachloro-3a,6a-diphenyltetrahydroimidazo[4,5-d]imidazole-2,5(1H,3H)-dione) or lactoperoxidase is commonly used for labeling peptides and proteins with radioiodine isotopes.

=== Disinfectant ===
Chloramine-T has a long history as a hospital disinfectant. It is effective against e.g. hepatitis and HI viruses. Unlike the more common sodium hypochlorite, chloramine-T is mildly basic, almost odorless and is not a bleaching agent.

== Safety ==
Chloramine-T is harmful if swallowed. It is corrosive on skin, eyes or mucous membranes. It releases toxic chlorine gas upon reaction with acids. It is water-soluble and thus can be released to the environment dissolved in water. It is a known sensitizer. Chloramine-T has been observed to cause occupational asthma and flu-like symptoms.

== Certifications ==
- EN 1276 Bactericidal
- EN 13713 Bactericidal
- EN 14675 Virucidal
- EN 14476 Virucidal Norovirus
- EN 1650 Fungicidal
- EN 13704 Sporicidal Clostridioides difficile
