= Pseudocholinesterase =

Pseudocholinesterase may refer to:

- Butyrylcholinesterase, an enzyme
- Aryl-acylamidase, an enzyme
