= Phenylpyrazole insecticides =

Family of insecticides

Chemical structure of fipronil, a common phenylpyrazole insecticide

Phenylpyrazole insecticides are a class of chemically-related broad-spectrum insecticides. The chemical structures of these insecticides are characterized by a central pyrazole ring with a phenyl group attached to one of the nitrogen atoms of the pyrazole.

== History ==
Phenylpyrazole insecticides were developed in response to increasing pesticide resistance to other chemicals. Now, along with neonicotinoids, they are some of the most widely-used pesticides.

== Mode of Action ==
Phenylpyrazole insecticides function by blocking GABA-gated chloride channels in insects (IRAC group 2B). Mammals do not have this type of chloride channel, making them much less susceptible to its effects. However, they do have the capacity to disrupt epithelial cells in the human intestine and adversely impact human health.

== Examples ==
Examples include:

- acetoprole
- ethiprole
- fipronil
- flufiprole
- pyraclofos
- pyrafluprole
- pyriprole
- pyrolan
- vaniliprole
