= Ectoparasitic infestation =

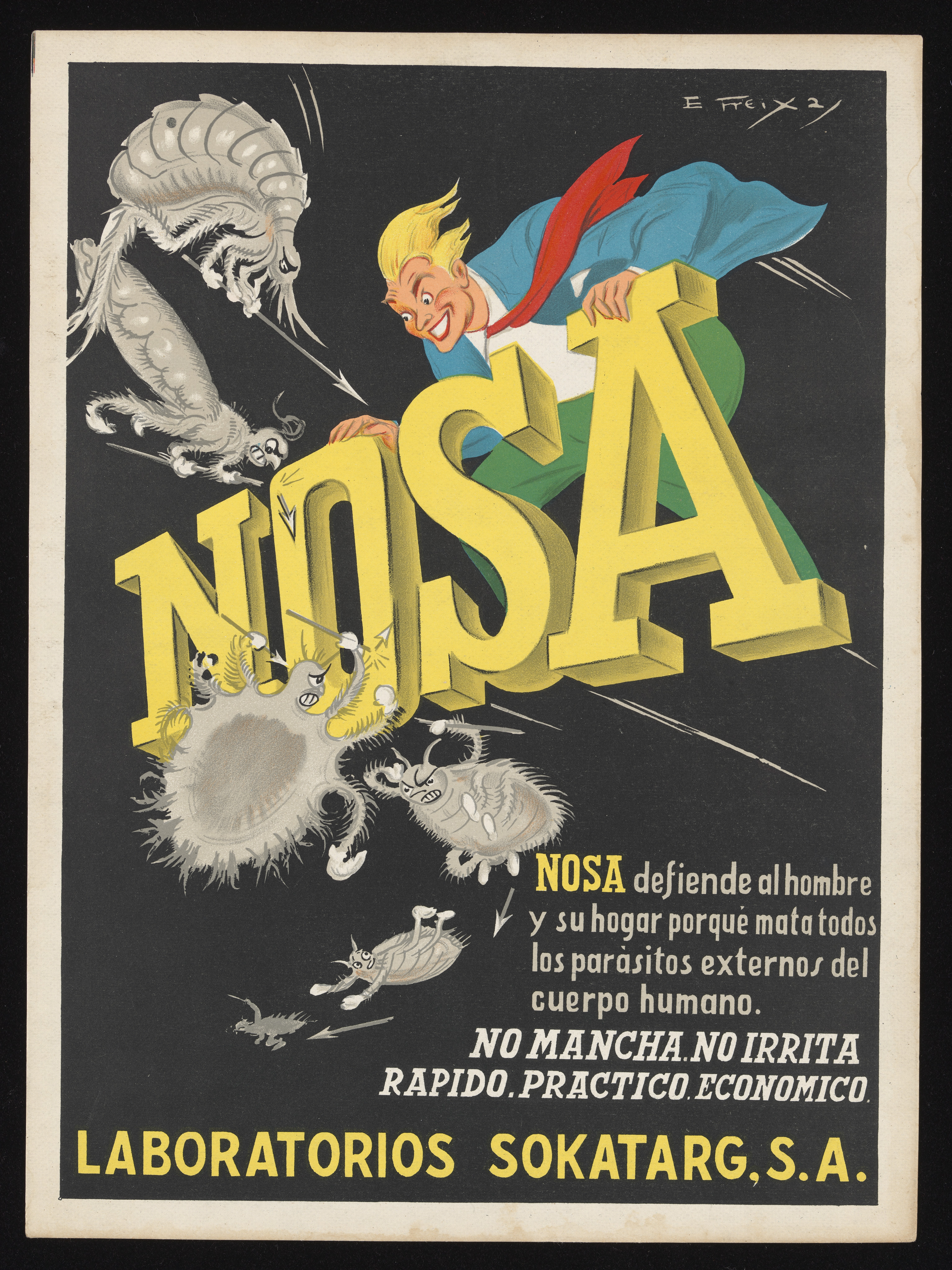
- An advert for Nosa treatment against body parasites created for Laboratorios SOKATARG.
- Specialty: Infectious disease

An ectoparasitic infestation is a parasitic disease caused by organisms that live primarily on the surface of the host.

Examples:

- Scabies
- Crab louse (pubic lice)
- Pediculosis (head lice)
- Gamasoidosis (avian mites)
- Lernaeocera branchialis (cod worm)

== See also ==
- Ectoparasiticide
