= Cythioate =

- Skeletal formula of cythioate with some implicit hydrogens

Names
- Preferred IUPAC name O,O-Dimethyl O-(4-sulfamoylphenyl) phosphorothioate
- Other names O-[4-(aminosulfonyl)phenyl] O,O-dimethyl phosphorothioate

Identifiers
CAS Number	115-93-5
3D model (JSmol)	Interactive image
Beilstein Reference	2148114
ChEMBL	ChEMBL2104588
ChemSpider	7992
ECHA InfoCard	100.003.742
EC Number	204-115-9
KEGG	D07768
MeSH	Cythioate
PubChem CID	8293
UNII	3OOH7Q4333
CompTox Dashboard (EPA)	DTXSID8041828
- InChI: InChI=1S/C8H12NO5PS2/c1-12-15(16,13-2)14-7-3-5-8(6-4-7)17(9,10)11/h3-6H,1-2H3,(H2,9,10,11) Key: BSBSDQUZDZXGFN-UHFFFAOYSA-N; InChI=1/C8H12NO5PS2/c1-12-15(16,13-2)14-7-3-5-8(6-4-7)17(9,10)11/h3-6H,1-2H3,(H2,9,10,11)
- SMILES: COP(=S)(OC)OC1=CC=C(C=C1)S(N)(=O)=O

Properties
Chemical formula	C_{8}H_{12}NO_{5}PS_{2}
Molar mass	297.28 g·mol^{−1}
Melting point	71 °C (160 °F; 344 K)

Pharmacology
ATCvet code	QP53AF10 (WHO)
- Except where otherwise noted, data are given for materials in their standard state (at 25 °C [77 °F], 100 kPa). verify (what is ?) Infobox references

Cythioate is an organothiophosphate chemical used as an insecticide and anthelmintic. It has been sold under the trade names Cyflee and Proban, under which form it has been used for veterinary purposes against fleas.
