= Aryl-acylamidase =

aryl-acylamidase

Identifiers
- EC no.: 3.5.1.13
- CAS no.: 9025-18-7

Databases
- IntEnz: IntEnz view
- BRENDA: BRENDA entry
- ExPASy: NiceZyme view
- KEGG: KEGG entry
- MetaCyc: metabolic pathway
- PRIAM: profile
- PDB structures: RCSB PDB PDBe PDBsum
- Gene Ontology: AmiGO / QuickGO
Search
- PMC: articles
- PubMed: articles
- NCBI: proteins

In enzymology, an aryl-acylamidase (EC 3.5.1.13) is an enzyme that catalyzes the chemical reaction

an anilide + H_{2}O $\rightleftharpoons$ a carboxylate + aniline

Thus, the two substrates of this enzyme are anilide and H_{2}O, whereas its two products are carboxylate and aniline.

This enzyme belongs to the family of hydrolases, those acting on carbon-nitrogen bonds other than peptide bonds, specifically in linear amides. The systematic name of this enzyme class is aryl-acylamide amidohydrolase. Other names in common use include AAA-1, AAA-2, brain acetylcholinesterase (is associated with AAA-2), and pseudocholinesterase (associated with arylacylamidase).
