= Tetrachlorvinphos =

Names
- Preferred IUPAC name (Z)-2-Chloro-1-(2,4,5-trichlorophenyl)ethen-1-yl dimethyl phosphate
- Other names: Stirofos; CVMP; TCVP; Benzyl alcohol, 2,4,5-trichloro-α-(chloromethylene)-, dimethyl phosphate; 2-Chloro-1-(2,4,5-trichlorophenyl) vinyl dimethyl phosphate; Gardona; IPO 8; NCI C00168; Rabon; Tetrachlorvinphos

Identifiers
CAS Number	22248-79-9
3D model (JSmol)	Interactive image
Beilstein Reference	1890909
ChEBI	CHEBI:35005
ChEMBL	ChEMBL1452359
ChemSpider	4447527
ECHA InfoCard	100.040.772
EC Number	244-865-4
KEGG	C14513; D05929
PubChem CID	5284462
RTECS number	TB9100000
UNII	DM33MW89QU
UN number	2783
CompTox Dashboard (EPA)	DTXSID1032648
- InChI: InChI=1S/C10H9Cl4O4P/c1-16-19(15,17-2)18-10(5-11)6-3-8(13)9(14)4-7(6)12/h3-5H,1-2H3/b10-5- Key: UBCKGWBNUIFUST-YHYXMXQVSA-N
- SMILES: COP(=O)(OC)O/C(=C\Cl)/c1cc(c(cc1Cl)Cl)Cl

Properties
Chemical formula	C_{10}H_{9}Cl_{4}O_{4}P
Molar mass	365.95 g·mol^{−1}
Melting point	97 to 98 °C (207 to 208 °F; 370 to 371 K)

Pharmacology
ATCvet code	QP53AF14 (WHO) QP53BB04 (WHO)

Hazards
- GHS labelling
Pictograms	(GHS07: Exclamation mark) (GHS09: Environmental hazard)
Signal word	Warning
Hazard statements	H302, H332, H410
Precautionary statements	P261, P264, P270, P271, P273, P301+P312, P304+P312, P304+P340, P312, P330, P391, P501
- Except where otherwise noted, data are given for materials in their standard state (at 25 °C [77 °F], 100 kPa). Infobox references

Tetrachlorvinphos is an organophosphate insecticide used to kill fleas and ticks.

== History ==
Tetrachlorvinphos was initially registered for use in the United States in 1966 by the U.S. Department of Agriculture. Tetrachlorvinphos was originally registered for use on various food crops, livestock, pet animals, and in or around buildings. The crop uses were voluntarily canceled from product registrations in 1987. In 2014, the Natural Resources Defense Council (NRDC) filed a lawsuit against the United States Environmental Protection Agency (EPA) seeking EPA to respond to NRDC's 2009 petition to ban tetrachlorvinphos in common pet flea treatment products.

== Human health hazards ==
Symptoms of exposure to this material include increased perspiration, nausea, lachrymation, salivation, blurred vision, diarrhea, pulmonary edema, respiratory depression and convulsions. The chemical material may be absorbed through the skin and is a lachrymator. It is a cholinesterase inhibitor and is a positive animal carcinogen.

== Chemical properties ==
The substance is insoluble in water. Flash point data are not available for this chemical; however, it is probably combustible. Tetrachlorvinphos is slowly hydrolyzed in neutral and aqueous acidic media. Is rapidly hydrolyzed in alkaline media.
