= Indoxacarb =

- Stereo wireframe model of (4aS)-Indoxacarb

Names
- Preferred IUPAC name Methyl 7-chloro-2,5-dihydro-2-[[(methoxycarbonyl)[4-(trifluoromethoxy)phenyl]amino]carbonyl]indeno[1,2-e][1,3,4]oxadiazine-4a(3H)-carboxylate
- Systematic IUPAC name (S)-Methyl 7-chloro-2-{[(methoxycarbonyl)[4-(trifluoromethoxy)phenyl]amino]carbonyl}-2H,3H,4aH,5H-indeno[1,2-e][1,3,4]oxadiazine-4a-carboxylate

Identifiers
CAS Number	173584-44-6
3D model (JSmol)	Interactive image
Abbreviations	DPX-MP062
Beilstein Reference	8366683
ChEBI	CHEBI:38630
ChEMBL	ChEMBL197676
ChemSpider	96889
ECHA InfoCard	100.132.370
KEGG	D06316
MeSH	Indoxacarb
PubChem CID	107720
UNII	52H0D26MWR
UN number	UN 3077
CompTox Dashboard (EPA)	DTXSID3040801
- InChI: InChI=1S/C22H17ClF3N3O7/c1-33-18(30)21-10-12-9-13(23)3-8-16(12)17(21)27-28(11-35-21)19(31)29(20(32)34-2)14-4-6-15(7-5-14)36-22(24,25)26/h3-9H,10-11H2,1-2H3 Key: VBCVPMMZEGZULK-UHFFFAOYSA-N
- SMILES: COC(=O)N(C(=O)N1COC2(C(=O)OC)Cc3cc(Cl)ccc3C2=N1)c1ccc(OC(F)(F)F)cc1

Properties
Chemical formula	C_{22}H_{17}ClF_{3}N_{3}O_{7}
Molar mass	527.84 g·mol^{−1}
Melting point	88.1 °C (190.6 °F; 361.2 K) 99% indoxacarb PAI

Pharmacology
ATCvet code	QP53AX27 (WHO)
- Except where otherwise noted, data are given for materials in their standard state (at 25 °C [77 °F], 100 kPa). Infobox references

Indoxacarb is an oxadiazine pesticide developed by DuPont that acts against lepidopteran larvae. It is marketed under the names Indoxacarb Technical Insecticide, Steward Insecticide and Avaunt Insecticide. It is also used as the active ingredient in the Syngenta line of commercial pesticides: Advion and Arilon.

Indoxacarb is a prodrug whose metabolite blocks of neuronal sodium channels belonging to IRAC group 22A. It is fairly lipophilic with a K_{ow} of 4.65. This pesticide should be used with caution since some insects such as the oriental tobacco budworm (Helicoverpa assulta) become resistant when exposed.

In 2021, the European Union chose not to renew Indoxacarb for use as a plant-protection insecticide. The United Kingdom still allowed its use until 2025.

== Development ==
Indoxacarb was developed by the McCann et al. team at E. I. du Pont de Nemours.

== Household products ==
Indoxacarb is the active ingredient in a number of household insecticides, including cockroach and ant baits, and can remain active after digestion. In 2012 DuPont's Professional Products including the line of Advion and Arilon products was purchased by Syngenta. Indoxacarb is the active ingredient in the pet product, Activyl, from Merck Animal Health. It is marketed to kill fleas on dogs and cats.

== Toxicity to humans ==
While toxicity to humans has not been formally studied, there is a reported case of a person consuming indoxacarb in a suicide attempt. The patient developed methemoglobinemia following ingestion. Methemoglobinemia (also known as blue baby syndrome) is a condition which ultimately decreases the effectiveness of red blood cells to exchange oxygen with organs. Methemoglobinemia can be fatal if left untreated, however when the cause is exposure to a chemical agent (not genetic) a variety of treatments are available and effective.
