= Sulfilimine =

Class of chemical compounds containing an S=N bond

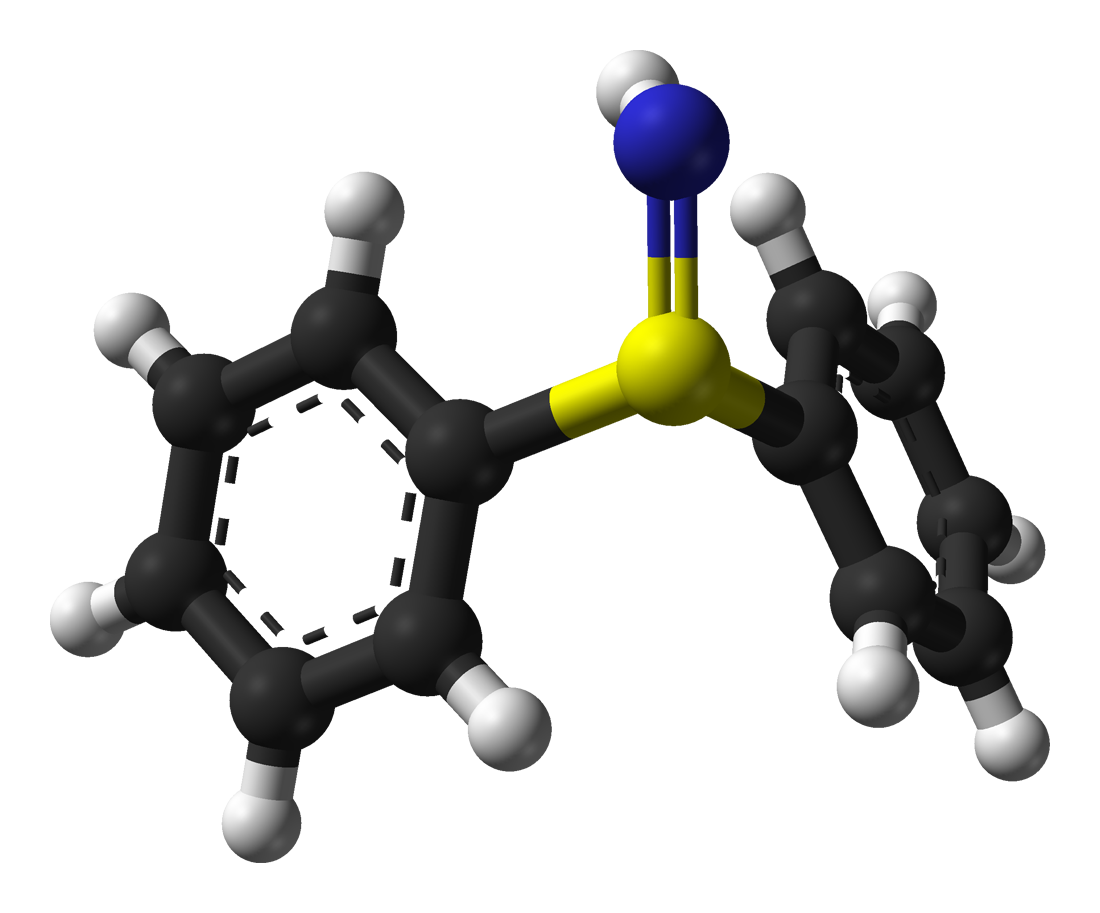
Ball-and-stick model of the diphenylsulfimide molecule, Ph_{2}S=NH

In chemistry, a sulfilimine (or sulfimide) is a type of chemical compound containing a sulfur-to-nitrogen bond which is often represented as a double bond (S=N). In fact, a double bond violates the octet rule, and the bond may be considered a single bond with a formal charge of +1 on the sulfur and a formal charge of −1 on the nitrogen. The parent compound is sulfilimine H_{2}S=NH, which is mainly of theoretical interest.

Examples include S,S-diphenylsulfilimine and sulfoximines such as methylphenylsulfoximine:

Methyl-phenylsulfoximine, a sulfur(VI) compound (left), and S,S-diphenylsulfilimine, a sulfur(IV) compound (right)

In the case of a sulfoximine, the bonds can be considered single bonds, with formal charges of −1 on both the oxygen and the nitrogen, and a formal charge of +2 on the sulfur.

== Preparation ==
Most sulfilimines are N-substituted with electron-withdrawing groups. These compounds are typically prepared by oxidation of thioethers with electrophilic amine reagents, such as chloramine-T in the presence of a base:

R_{2}S + ClNHTs → R_{2}S=NTs + HCl

An alternative route involves reactions of electrophilic sulfur compounds with amines. The imidosulfonium reagents provide a source of "Me_{2}S^{2+}", which are attacked by amines.

In general, aliphatic sulfilimines, unsubstituted at N, are not stable above −30 °C (−22 °F). However, compounds of the form Me_{2}S(NX)_{2}, X a halogen, are stable well above room temperature.

KMnO_{4} can oxidize sulfilimines to sulfoximines, but the latter are more generally produced from addition of azides to sulfoxides.

== Sulfilimine bonds in proteins ==
Sulfilimine bonds stabilize collagen IV strands found in the extracellular matrix, and evolved at least 500 mya. These bonds covalently connect hydroxylysine and methionine residues of adjacent polypeptide strands to form a larger collagen trimer.
