= Fenthion =

Names
- Preferred IUPAC name O,O-Dimethyl O-[3-methyl-4-(methylsulfanyl)phenyl] phosphorothioate
- Other names • Dimethoxy-[3-methyl-4-(methylthio)phenoxy]-thioxophosphorane • O,O-Dimethyl O-[3-methyl-4-(methylthio)phenyl] phosphorothioate • O,O-Dimethyl O-4-methylthio-m-tolyl phosphorothioate

Identifiers
CAS Number	55-38-9
3D model (JSmol)	Interactive image
ChEBI	CHEBI:34761
ChEMBL	ChEMBL1604375
ChemSpider	3229
ECHA InfoCard	100.000.211
KEGG	D07950
PubChem CID	3346
UNII	BL0L45OVKT
CompTox Dashboard (EPA)	DTXSID8020620
- InChI: InChI=1S/C10H15O3PS2/c1-8-7-9(5-6-10(8)16-4)13-14(15,11-2)12-3/h5-7H,1-4H3 Key: PNVJTZOFSHSLTO-UHFFFAOYSA-N; InChI=1/C10H15O3PS2/c1-8-7-9(5-6-10(8)16-4)13-14(15,11-2)12-3/h5-7H,1-4H3 Key: PNVJTZOFSHSLTO-UHFFFAOYAH
- SMILES: S=P(OC)(OC)Oc1ccc(SC)c(c1)C

Properties
Chemical formula	C_{10}H_{15}O_{3}PS_{2}
Molar mass	278.33 g/mol
Appearance	colorless, almost odorless liquid; 95-98% pure fenthion is a brown oily liquid with a weak garlic odor
Density	1.250 g/cm^{3} (at 20 °C / 4 °C)
Melting point	7 °C (45 °F; 280 K)
Boiling point	87 °C (189 °F; 360 K) at 0.01 mmHg
Solubility in water	54-56 ppm (at 20 °C)
Solubility in glyceride oils, methanol, ethanol, ether, acetone, and most organic solvents, especially chlorinated hydrocarbons	soluble
Vapor pressure	4 • 10^{−5} mmHg (at 20 °C)

Pharmacology
ATCvet code	QP53BB02 (WHO)

Hazards
- NIOSH (US health exposure limits)
PEL (Permissible)	none
REL (Recommended)	None established
IDLH (Immediate danger)	N.D.
- Except where otherwise noted, data are given for materials in their standard state (at 25 °C [77 °F], 100 kPa). verify (what is ?) Infobox references

Fenthion is an organothiophosphate insecticide, avicide, and acaricide. Like most other organophosphates, its mode of action is via cholinesterase inhibition. Due to its relatively low toxicity towards humans and mammals, fenthion is listed as moderately toxic compound in U.S. Environmental Protection Agency and World Health Organization toxicity class.

== Uses ==
Fenthion is a contact and stomach insecticide used against many biting insects. It is particularly effective against fruit flies, leaf hoppers, cereal bugs, stem borers, mosquitoes, animal parasites, mites, aphids, codling moths, and weaver birds. It has been widely used in sugar cane, rice, field corn, beets, pome and stone fruit, citrus fruits, pistachio, cotton, olives, coffee, cocoa, vegetables, and vines.

Based on its high toxicity on birds, fenthion has been used to control weaver birds and other pest-birds in many parts of the world. Fenthion is also used in cattle, swine, and dogs to control lice, fleas, ticks, flies, and other external parasites.

Amid concerns of harmful effects on environment, especially birds, Food and Drug Administration no longer approves uses of fenthion. However, fenthion has been extensively used in Florida to control adult mosquitoes. After preliminary risk assessments on human health and environment in 1998 and its revision in 1999, USEPA issued an Interim Reregistration Eligibility Decision (IRED) for fenthion in January 2001. The EPA has classified fenthion as Restricted Use Pesticide (RUP), and warrants special handling because of its toxicity.

Some common trade names for fenthion are Avigel, Avigrease, Entex, Baytex, Baycid, Dalf, DMPT, Mercaptophos, Prentox, Fenthion 4E, Queletox, and Lebaycid. Fenthion is available in dust, emulsifiable concentrate, granular, liquid concentrate, spray concentrate, ULV, and wettable powder formulations.

== Synthesis ==
Fenthion can be synthesized by condensation of 4-methylmercapto-m-cresol and dimethyl phosphorochloridothionate.

== Health effects ==
Fenthion exposure to general population is quite limited based on its bioavailability. Common form of fenthion exposure is occupation related, and occurs through dermal contact or inhalation of dust and sprays. Another likely means of contamination is through ingestion of food, especially, if it has been applied quite recently with fenthion. So far, ingestion is the most likely severe poisoning case on humans and animals. To avoid this, crops applied with fenthion should be allowed enough degradation time before harvesting. Normally, two to four weeks time is enough depending upon the type of crop.

Fenthion poisoning is consistent with symptoms of other organophosphate effects on human health. Primarily, the effect is cholinesterase inhibition.

=== Acute toxicity ===
Acute poisoning of fenthion results in miosis (pinpoint pupils), headache, nausea/vomiting, dizziness, muscle weakness, drowsiness, lethargy, agitation, or anxiety. If the poisoning is moderate or severe, it results in chest tightness, breathing difficulty, hypertension, abdominal pain, diarrhea, heavy salivation, profuse sweating, or fasciculation.

=== Chronic toxicity ===
Chronic effect of fenthion has not been reported.

== Environmental effects ==
Despite short half-life in the environment, fenthion toxicity is highly significant to birds and estuarine/marine invertebrates. Even though some parts of the world use fenthion to control pest birds, such as weaver bird, many non-targeted wild birds are victim of fenthion poisoning. Acute symptoms of fenthion poisoning in birds include tearing of the eyes, foamy salivation, lack of movement, tremors, congestion of the windpipe, lack of coordination in walking, and an abnormally rapid rate of breathing or difficult breathing. Fenthion has been found toxic to fishes and other aquatic invertebrates. Bees are also found to be greatly affected by fenthion contamination.

=== Degradation in nature ===
Photodegradation and biodegradation are common mechanisms of fenthion degradation in the environment. In the atmosphere, vapor phase fenthion reacts rapidly with photochemically produced hydroxyl radicals, and its half-life is about 5 hours. In soil and water, photodegradation is again predominant mechanism if there is enough presence of sunlight. Under normal aquatic environment, half-life of fenthion in water is 2.9 to 21.1 days. It may be photodynamically, chemically or biologically degraded. The degradation mechanisms can be hydrolysis, oxidation, and/or alkylation-dealkylation, which are dependent on the presence of light, temperature, alkali, or enzymatic activity.

In soil, fenthion degradation ranges from four to six weeks and it occurs through photodegradation as well as anaerobic or non-photolytic organisms. However, soil particles strongly adsorb fenthion making it less susceptible to percolate with water through the soil.

== Regulation ==
=== India ===
Fenthion was used in India for more than 30 years as a larvicide for control of mosquito larvae. The compound was on the review list of Central Insecticide Board in India and they decided to ban the product due to high toxicity concerns. All manufacture after January 2017 was banned. Subsequently a complete ban order, barring all import and usage was issued in August 2018.

=== Australia ===
Fenthion and dimethoate were widely used to combat the Queensland fruit fly (Bactrocera tryoni), a species that has caused more than $28.5 million a year in damage to Australian fruit crops. However, it was banned in 2011 due to safety concerns. Other insecticides and control techniques are being investigated to control the spread of this pest.
