= Omethoate =

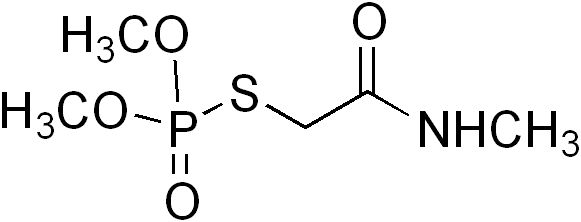

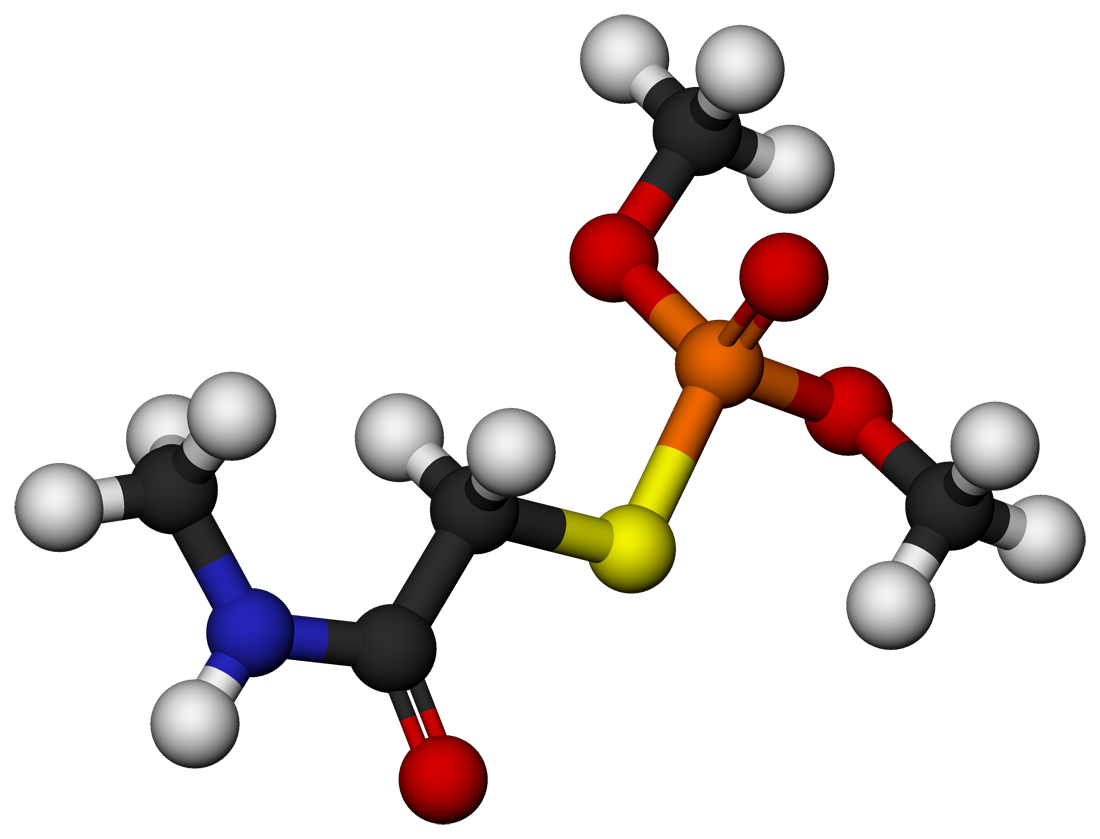

Names
- Preferred IUPAC name O,O-Dimethyl S-[2-(methylamino)-2-oxoethyl] phosphorothioate
- Other names: Dimethoxon; O,O-Dimethyl S-methylcarbamoylmethyl phosphorothioate; Folimat

Identifiers
CAS Number	1113-02-6
3D model (JSmol)	Interactive image
ChEBI	CHEBI:38730
ChEMBL	ChEMBL2270068
ChemSpider	13574
ECHA InfoCard	100.012.907
KEGG	C18662
PubChem CID	14210
UNII	28U28EWE79
CompTox Dashboard (EPA)	DTXSID4037580
- InChI: InChI=1S/C5H12NO4PS/c1-6-5(7)4-12-11(8,9-2)10-3/h4H2,1-3H3,(H,6,7) Key: PZXOQEXFMJCDPG-UHFFFAOYSA-N; InChI=1/C5H12NO4PS/c1-6-5(7)4-12-11(8,9-2)10-3/h4H2,1-3H3,(H,6,7) Key: PZXOQEXFMJCDPG-UHFFFAOYAZ
- SMILES: O=C(NC)CSP(=O)(OC)OC

Properties
Chemical formula	C_{5}H_{12}NO_{4}PS
Molar mass	213.19 g·mol^{−1}
- Except where otherwise noted, data are given for materials in their standard state (at 25 °C [77 °F], 100 kPa). verify (what is ?) Infobox references

Omethoate (C_{5}H_{12}NO_{4}PS) is a systemic organophosphorous insecticide and acaricide available as a soluble concentrate. It is used to control insects and mites in horticulture and agriculture, as well as in the home garden.

Omethoate works by inhibiting the enzyme acetylcholinesterase. This inhibition over-stimulates parts of the nervous system that rely on acetylcholine to transmit nerve impulses.

It is an irritant to the skin and mucous membranes. Its toxicity and hazard potential are still under review because of concerns about its safety. Additionally, it cannot be used on food products.

The acceptable daily intake (ADI) has been amended from 0.0003 to 0.0004 mg/kg bw.
