= Fipronil =

- 2D chemical structure of fipronil

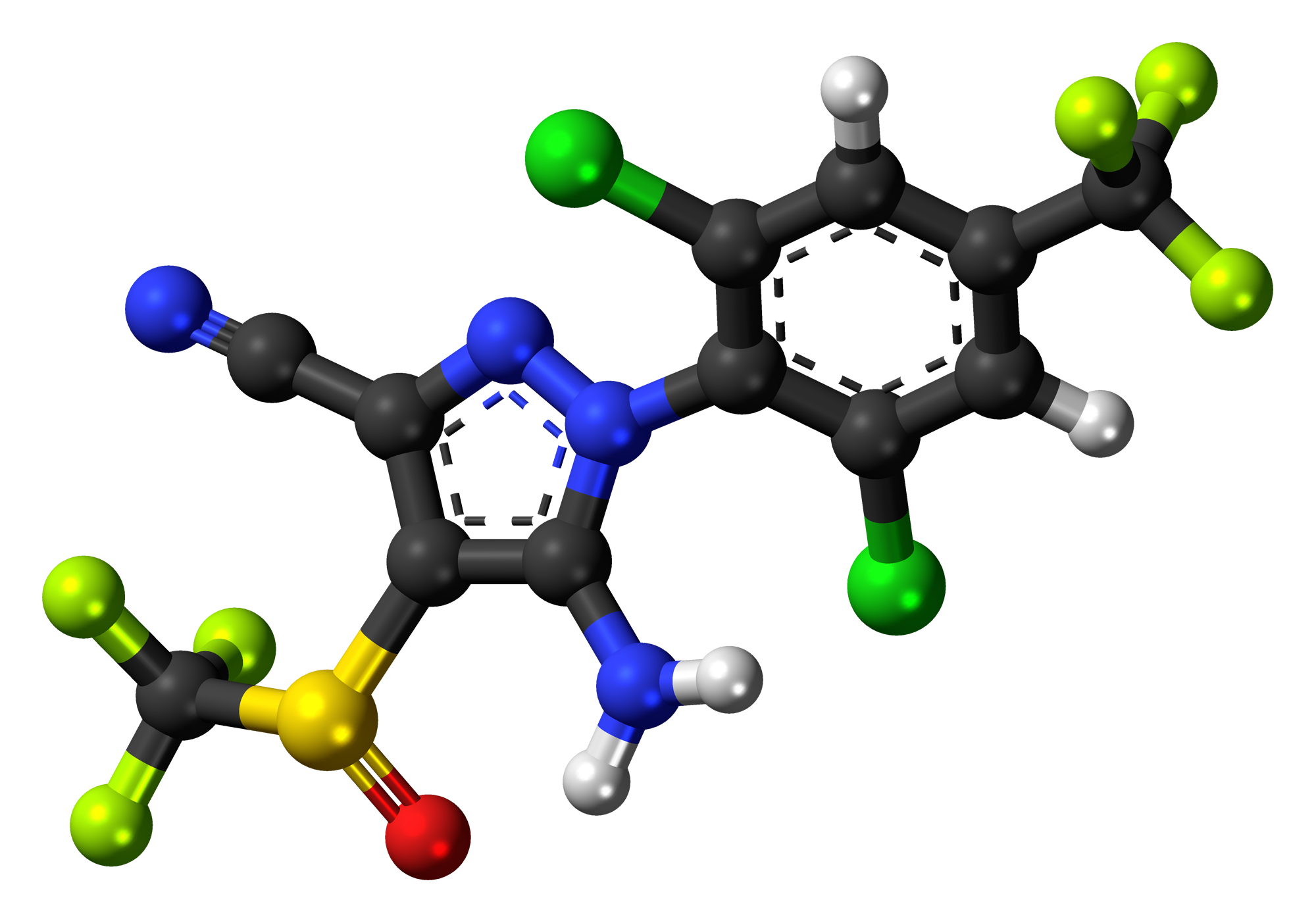
- 3D chemical structure of fipronil

Names
- Preferred IUPAC name 5-amino-1-[2,6-dichloro-4-(trifluoromethyl)phenyl]-4-(trifluoromethylsulfinyl)pyrazole-3-carbonitrile
- Other names Fipronil; Fluocyanobenpyrazole; Taurus; Termidor

Identifiers
CAS Number	120068-37-3
3D model (JSmol)	Interactive image
ChEBI	CHEBI:5063
ChEMBL	ChEMBL101326
ChemSpider	3235
ECHA InfoCard	100.102.312
KEGG	D01042
PubChem CID	3352
UNII	QGH063955F
CompTox Dashboard (EPA)	DTXSID4034609
- InChI: InChI=1S/C12H4Cl2F6N4OS/c13-5-1-4(11(15,16)17)2-6(14)8(5)24-10(22)9(7(3-21)23-24)26(25)12(18,19)20/h1-2H,22H2 Key: ZOCSXAVNDGMNBV-UHFFFAOYSA-N; InChI=1/C12H4Cl2F6N4OS/c13-5-1-4(11(15,16)17)2-6(14)8(5)24-10(22)9(7(3-21)23-24)26(25)12(18,19)20/h1-2H,22H2 Key: ZOCSXAVNDGMNBV-UHFFFAOYAP
- SMILES: FC(F)(F)S(=O)c2c(C#N)nn(c1c(Cl)cc(cc1Cl)C(F)(F)F)c2N

Properties
Chemical formula	C_{12}H_{4}Cl_{2}F_{6}N_{4}OS
Molar mass	437.14 g·mol^{−1}
Density	1.477-1.626 g/cm^{3}
Melting point	200.5 °C (392.9 °F; 473.6 K)

Pharmacology
ATCvet code	QP53AX15 (WHO)

Hazards
- GHS labelling
Pictograms	(GHS06: Toxic) (GHS08: Health hazard) (GHS09: Environmental hazard)
Signal word	Danger
NFPA 704 (fire diamond)	2 1 0
- Lethal dose or concentration (LD, LC)
LD_{50} (median dose)	97 mg/kg (rat, oral)
LC_{50} (median concentration)	0.25 mg/L (rainbow trout, aquatic)
Safety data sheet (SDS)	Fipronil
- Except where otherwise noted, data are given for materials in their standard state (at 25 °C [77 °F], 100 kPa). Infobox references

Fipronil is a broad-spectrum insecticide that belongs to the phenylpyrazole insecticide class. Fipronil disrupts the insect central nervous system by blocking the ligand-gated ion channel of the GABA_{A} receptor (IRAC group 2B) and glutamate-gated chloride (GluCl) channels. This causes hyperexcitation of contaminated insects' nerves and muscles. Fipronil's specificity towards insects is believed to be due to a greater binding affinity for the GABA_{A} receptors of insects than to those of mammals, and for the action on GluCl channels, which do not exist in mammals. As of 2017, there does not appear to be significant resistance among fleas to fipronil.

Fipronil is used as the active ingredient in flea control products for pets and home roach baits as well as field pest control for corn, golf courses, and commercial turf. Its widespread use makes its specific effects the subject of considerable attention. Observations on possible harm to humans or ecosystems are ongoing as well as the monitoring of pesticide resistance development.

== Physical properties ==
Fipronil (IUPAC name 5-amino-1-[2,6-dichloro-4-(trifluoromethyl)phenyl]-4-(trifluoromethylsulfinyl)pyrazole-3-carbonitrile) is a white, solid powder with a moldy odor. It is degraded slightly by sunlight, stable at normal temperatures for one year, and is not stable in presence of metal ions.

== Use ==
Fipronil has been used against many different pests on different crops. It is used against major lepidopteran (moth, butterfly, etc.) and orthopteran (grasshopper, locust, etc.) pests on a range of field and horticultural crops and against coleopteran (beetle) larvae in soils. It is employed for cockroach and ant control as well as locust control and termite pest control. In the United States of America, fipronil was approved for use against the Rasberry crazy ant until 2022 in counties of Texas where positive identification had been made by entomologists from the Texas Department of Agriculture and the Environmental Protection Agency. In New Zealand, fipronil was used in trials to control wasps (Vespula spp.), which are a threat to indigenous biodiversity. It is now being used by the Department of Conservation to attempt local eradication of wasps, and is being recommended for control of the invasive Argentine ant. Fipronil is also the active ingredient in many commercial tick and flea treatments for pets.

== Effects ==
=== Toxicity ===
Fipronil is classed as a WHO Class II moderately hazardous pesticide, and has a rat acute oral LD_{50} of 97 mg/kg.

It has moderate acute toxicity by the oral and inhalation routes in rats. Dermal absorption in rats is less than 1% after 24 hours exposure and toxicity is considered to be low. It has been found to be very toxic to rabbits.

The environmental degradation product desulfinylfipronil, appears to have a higher acute toxicity to mammals than fipronil itself by a factor of about 10.

Symptoms of acute toxicity via ingestion includes sweating, nausea, vomiting, headache, abdominal pain, dizziness, agitation, weakness, and tonic-clonic seizures. Clinical signs of exposure to fipronil are generally reversible and resolve spontaneously. As of 2011, no data were available regarding the chronic effects of fipronil on humans. The United States Environmental Protection Agency has classified fipronil as a group C (possible human) carcinogen based on an increase in thyroid follicular cell tumors in both sexes of the rat. However, as of 2011, no human data are available regarding the carcinogenic effects of fipronil.

Two Frontline TopSpot products were determined by the New York State Department of Environmental Conservation to pose no significant exposure risks to workers applying the product. However, concerns were raised about human exposure to Frontline spray treatment in 1996, leading to a denial of registration for the spray product. Commercial pet groomers and veterinary physicians were considered to be at risk from chronic exposure via inhalation and dermal absorption during the application of the spray, assuming they may have to treat up to 20 large dogs per day. Fipronil is not volatile, so the likelihood of humans being exposed to this compound in the air is low.

In contrast to neonicotinoids such as acetamiprid, clothianidin, imidacloprid, and thiamethoxam, which are absorbed through the skin to some extent, fipronil is not absorbed substantially through the skin.

=== Drinking water contamination ===
In 2021, the US EPA put fipronil on the Draft Fifth Contaminant Candidate List (CCL 5) which can lead to future regulation under the Safe Drinking Water Act.

=== Detection in body fluids ===
Fipronil may be quantitated in plasma by gas chromatography-mass spectrometry or liquid chromatography-mass spectrometry to confirm a diagnosis of poisoning in hospitalized patients or to provide evidence in a medicolegal death investigation.

=== Ecological toxicity ===
Fipronil is highly toxic to crustaceans, insects (including bees and termites) and zooplankton, as well as rabbits, the fringe-toed lizard, and certain groups of gallinaceous birds. It appears to reduce the longevity and fecundity of female braconid parasitoids. It is also highly toxic to many fish, though its toxicity varies with species. Conversely, the substance is relatively innocuous to passerines, wildfowl, and earthworms.

Its half-life in soil is four months to one year, but much less on the soil surface because it is more sensitive to light (photolysis) than water (hydrolysis).

Few studies of effects on wildlife have been conducted, but studies of the nontarget impact from emergency applications of fipronil as barrier sprays for locust control in Madagascar showed adverse impacts of fipronil on termites, which appear to be very severe and long-lived. Also, adverse effects were indicated in the short term on several other invertebrate groups, one species of lizard (Trachylepis elegans), and several species of birds (including the Madagascar bee-eater).

Nontarget effects on some insects (predatory and detritivorous beetles, some parasitic wasps and bees) were also found in field trials of fipronil for desert locust control in Mauritania, and very low doses (0.6-2.0 g a.i./ha) used against grasshoppers in Niger caused impacts on nontarget insects comparable to those found with other insecticides used in grasshopper control. The implications of this for other wildlife and the ecology of the habitat remain unknown, but appear unlikely to be severe. This lack of severity was not observed in bee species in South America. Fipronil is also used in Brazil and studies on the stingless bee Scaptotrigona postica have shown adverse reactions to the pesticide, including seizures, paralysis, and death with a lethal dose of .54 ng a.i./bee and a lethal concentration of .24 ng a.i./μl diet. These values are highly toxic in Scaptotrigona postica and bees in general. Toxic baiting with fipronil has been shown to be effective in locally eliminating German wasps. All colonies within foraging range were eliminated within one week.

In May 2003, the French Directorate-General of Food at the Ministry of Agriculture determined that a case of mass bee mortality observed in southern France was related to acute fipronil toxicity. Toxicity was linked to defective seed treatment, which generated dust. In February 2003, the ministry decided to temporarily suspend the sale of all pesticides manufactured by the company BASF in France. The seed treatment involved has since been banned.

Notable results from wildlife studies include:

- Fipronil is highly toxic to fish and aquatic invertebrates. Its tendency to bind to sediments and its low water solubility may reduce the potential hazard to aquatic wildlife.
- Fipronil is toxic to bees and should not be applied to vegetation when bees are foraging.
- Based on ecological effects, fipronil is highly toxic to upland game birds on an acute oral basis and very highly toxic on a subacute dietary basis, but is practically nontoxic to waterfowl on both acute and subacute bases.
- Chronic (avian reproduction) studies show no effects at the highest levels tested in mallards (NOEC = 1000 ppm) or quail (NOEC = 10 ppm). The metabolite MB 46136 is more toxic than the parent to avian species tested (very highly toxic to upland game birds and moderately toxic to waterfowl on an acute oral basis).
- Fipronil is highly toxic to bluegill sunfish and highly toxic to rainbow trout on an acute basis.
- An early-lifestage toxicity study in rainbow trout found that fipronil affects larval growth with a NOEC of 0.0066 ppm and an LOEC of 0.015 ppm. The metabolite MB 46136 is more toxic than the parent to freshwater fish (6.3 times more toxic to rainbow trout and 3.3 times more toxic to bluegill sunfish). Based on an acute daphnia study using fipronil and three supplemental studies using its metabolites, fipronil is characterized as highly toxic to aquatic invertebrates.
- An invertebrate lifecycle daphnia study showed that fipronil affects length in daphnids at concentrations greater than 9.8 ppb.
- A lifecycle study in mysids shows fipronil affects reproduction, survival, and growth of mysids at concentrations less than 5 ppt.
- Acute studies of estuarine animals using oysters, mysids, and sheepshead minnows show that fipronil is highly acutely toxic to oysters and sheepshead minnows, and very highly toxic to mysids. Metabolites MB 46136 and MB 45950 are more toxic than the parent to freshwater invertebrates (MB 46136 is 6.6 times more toxic and MB 45950 is 1.9 times more toxic to freshwater invertebrates).

=== Colony collapse disorder ===
Fipronil is one of the main chemical causes blamed for the spread of colony collapse disorder among bees. It has been found by the Minutes-Association for Technical Coordination Fund in France that even at very low nonlethal doses for bees, the pesticide still impairs their ability to locate their hive, resulting in large numbers of forager bees lost with every pollen-finding expedition. A synergistic toxic effect of fipronil with the fungal pathogen Nosema ceranae was recently reported. The functional basis for this toxic effect is now understood: the synergy between fipronil and the pathogenic fungus induces changes in male bee physiology leading to infertility. A 2013 report by the European Food Safety Authority identified fipronil as "a high acute risk to honeybees when used as a seed treatment for maize" and on July 16, 2013, the EU voted to ban the use of fipronil on maize and sunflowers within the EU. The ban took effect at the end of 2013.

=== Pharmacodynamics ===
Fipronil acts by binding to allosteric sites of GABA_{A} receptors and GluCl receptors (of insects) as an antagonist (a form of noncompetitive inhibition). This prevents the opening of chloride ion channels normally encouraged by GABA, reducing the chloride ions' ability to lower a neuron's membrane potential. This results in an overabundance of neurons reaching action potential and likewise CNS toxicity via overstimulation.

Acute oral LD_{50} (rat) 97 mg/kg
Acute dermal LD_{50} (rat) >2000 mg/kg

In mammals (including humans) fipronil overdose is characterized by vomiting, agitation, and seizures. Intravenous or intramuscular benzodiazepines are a useful antidote.

== History ==
=== Development ===
Fipronil was discovered and developed by Rhône-Poulenc between 1985 and 1987, and placed on the market in 1993 under the B2 U.S. patent 5,232,940 B2. Between 1987 and 1996, fipronil was evaluated on more than 250 insect pests on 60 crops worldwide, and crop protection accounted for about 39% of total fipronil production in 1997. Since 2003, BASF holds the patent rights for producing and selling fipronil-based products in many countries.

=== 2017 fipronil eggs contamination ===
The 2017 fipronil eggs contamination is an incident in Europe and South Korea involving the spread of insecticide contaminated eggs and egg products. Chicken eggs were found to contain fipronil and distributed to 15 European Union countries, Switzerland, and Hong Kong. Approximately 700,000 eggs are thought to have reached shelves in the UK alone. Eggs at 44 farms in Taiwan were also found with excessive fipronil levels.

== Degradation ==
In organisms and in environmental media, fipronil degrades to fipronil sulfone, fipronil desulfinyl and fipronil sulfide, among others.

Degradation pathways of fipronil in the environment
