= Ectoparasiticide =

Antipatasitic drug used in the treatment of ectoparasitic infections

An ectoparasiticide is an antiparasitic drug used in the treatment of ectoparasitic infestations. These drugs are used to kill the parasites that live on the body surface. Permethrin, sulfur, lindane, dicophane, benzyl benzoate, ivermectin and crotamiton are well known ectoparasiticides. Additionally, ectoparasiticides have been used to safely contaminate rhinoceros horns with hopes of it deterring the demand for these horns on the black market.

== Variants ==
=== Permethrin ===
Broad-spectrum and potent pyrethroid insecticide and is most convenient for both scabies and lice. First choice drug. Permethrin exerts its therapeutic effect by disrupting sodium transport across neuronal membranes in arthropods, inducing depolarization. This mechanism ultimately leads to respiratory paralysis in the affected arthropod, establishing permethrin as a potent agent in managing scabies and pediculosis.

Additional information about treatment failure rates amongst medications used to treat ectoparasites:

https://www.dermatologyadvisor.com/news/scabies-treatment-failure-rates-increasing-among-children-and-adults/

The above research article, noted from current studies, shows that Permethrin is only 89.2% effective. There is noted resistance that has been increasing each year, as noted in the article.

=== Crotamiton ===
Second choice drug. Effective scabicide, pediculicide and antipruritic. Cure rate 60-88%.

=== Benzyl benzoate ===
2nd line drug for scabies and is seldom used for pediculosis. Cure rate 76-100%

=== Lindane ===
Effective in treating head lice (67-92%cure) and scabies (84-92% cure) with a single treatment. Penetrates through chitinous covers and affecting the nervous system.

=== Sulfur ===
Oldest scabicide and weak pediculicide, antiseptic, fungicide and keratolytic. Applied to skin, it is slowly reduced to H_{2}S and oxidized to SO_{2} and pentathionic acid, which dissolve the cuticle of itch mites and kill it.

=== Ivermectin ===
Antihelminthic drug found highly effective in scabies and pediculosis. Acts through a glutamate-gated Cl^{−} ion channel found only in invertebrates.

=== Dicophan ===
Insecticide for mosquito, flies and other pests. Penetrates through the exoskeleton and acts as a neurotoxin.

== Other Applications ==
=== Possible Poaching Deterrent ===
Ectoparasiticides have seen use as chemical agents in South Africa with the aim of devaluing rhinoceros horns and combating illegal poaching. Lorinda Hern, founder of the Rhino Rescue Project, devised a plan to infuse rhino horns with ectoparasiticides and mark the outer surface with a bright pink dye. This innovative approach seeks to deter poachers by creating health concerns amongst potential buyer communities. The procedure involves drilling into the rhinoceros horn, injecting it with an ectoparasiticide compound, and tagging it with a distinctive pink dye. The drill and inject procedure is considered harmless to the rhinoceros species due to the horn being isolated from both the nervous system and the bloodstream.
