= Thai School Milk Programme =

Thai government nutrition programme providing milk to students

- โครงการนมโรงเรียน

Agency overview
- Formed: 1992
- Jurisdiction: Government of Thailand
- Headquarters: Bangkok, Thailand
- Annual budget: ฿14 billion (FY2024)
- Parent department: Ministry of Agriculture and Cooperatives; Ministry of Education
- Website: Dairy Farming Promotion Organization of Thailand

The Thai School Milk Programme (Thai: โครงการนมโรงเรียน) is a nationwide nutrition initiative of the Government of Thailand that provides free milk to preschool and primary school students. Established in 1992 following a 1985 pilot project created to absorb surplus milk from Thai dairy farmers, the programme distributes approximately 200 millilitres of milk per child on school days. It is jointly administered by the Ministry of Agriculture and Cooperatives and the Ministry of Education, with an annual government budget of around 14 billion baht. The programme aims to improve child nutrition, foster long-term milk consumption habits, and sustain Thailand’s domestic dairy industry, and has been credited with significantly increasing national milk production and consumption.

== History ==
The programme originated in response to protests by dairy farmers in 1984 over surplus unsold milk. To address the issue, the Thai Cabinet established the National Milk Drinking Campaign Board in 1985 and launched a pilot project in Bangkok and Chiang Mai that offered milk at subsidized rates to parents of schoolchildren. Following the success of the pilot, the government introduced a nationwide programme in 1992 to distribute free milk to public schools.

The programme significantly contributed to the growth of Thailand’s dairy sector. Annual milk production rose from approximately 290 million litres in the early 1990s to more than 1.1 billion litres by 2003, while per capita milk consumption increased from about 2 litres in 1984 to over 23 litres in 2002.

Between 2009 and 2018, competition for milk supply quotas led to various administrative and quality concerns, including reports of spoiled milk and inefficient distribution. In 2019, reforms were introduced to improve transparency and re-establish clear quota zones for suppliers.

== Objectives ==
The key objectives of the Thai School Milk Programme are:

- To improve child health and nutrition through regular milk intake.
- To develop sustainable demand for dairy products among Thai consumers.
- To provide stable income for local dairy farmers and cooperatives.
- To ensure that milk distributed under the scheme is produced locally and meets safety standards.

== Implementation and structure ==
The programme is jointly managed by the Ministry of Agriculture and Cooperatives and the Ministry of Education. Thailand is divided into several milk zones, each with its own supply network to reduce transportation costs and balance local supply and demand. Participating schools receive milk deliveries on designated days, providing approximately 200 ml per child per school day. Only pasteurized or UHT milk is permitted, and since 2004 all processors must obtain HACCP certification.

== Coverage ==
The programme covers preschool and primary students across most regions of Thailand. As of 2024, it was estimated to benefit approximately 3.9 million children.

== Funding ==
The programme is funded through Thailand’s national budget, primarily under allocations from the Ministry of Education and the Ministry of Agriculture and Cooperatives. Annual budgets typically range between 10 and 15 billion baht depending on student enrolment and milk prices. In fiscal year 2024, the total cost was approximately 14 billion baht.

== Challenges and criticism ==
Despite its success, the School Milk Programme has faced recurring challenges:

- Distribution logistics – maintaining a cold chain and equitable delivery across rural schools.
- Budget constraints – increasing milk costs against fixed subsidies.
- Procurement transparency – concerns over quota allocation and competition among suppliers.
- Quality issues – sporadic reports of spoiled milk reaching schools during periods of intense competition (2009–2018).

== Outcomes and impact ==
The programme has been associated with improved child nutrition, increased milk consumption, and greater awareness of dairy’s benefits among Thai children. Economically, it stabilizes the dairy sector by guaranteeing a domestic market for local producers, accounting for more than 30 percent of Thailand’s liquid milk sales.

== Recent developments ==
In 2025, media reports indicated continued competition over milk quotas, with some agricultural colleges losing supplier rights under revised regulations. Later the same year, the Cabinet of Thailand approved an additional 800 million baht in emergency funds to address issues of stockpiled UHT milk and delayed deliveries.

== See also ==
- Dairy Farming Promotion Organization of Thailand
- School lunch program in Thailand
- Education in Thailand
- Food and Agriculture Organization
- Agriculture in Thailand
