= Tapioca industry of Thailand =

The tapioca industry of Thailand plays an important role in the agricultural economy of Thailand. Tapioca is dried cassava in powder or pearly form. Tapioca (Thai: มันสำปะหลัง; RTGS: man sampalang), besides being used as a food, the "native starch" it provides is used as a thickening agent and a stabilizer in many products. Native starch is a powder obtained from plants containing starch. Native starch is extracted from the root of the cassava plant, which has the ability to grow in dry weather and low-nutrient soils where other crops do not grow well. Cassava roots can be stored in the ground for up to 24 months, and for some varieties for up to 36 months, thus harvest may be extended until market conditions are favourable or starch production capacity is available.

== History ==
Cassava originated in South America, where it was cultivated for 3,000–7,000 years. The Portuguese and the Spanish took cassava from Mexico to the Philippines in the 17th century. The Dutch introduced it to Indonesia in the 18th century. It is unclear when cassava was first introduced to Thailand, but one estimate is that it was imported from what is known now as Malaysia in 1786.

Cassava was first commercially planted in the south of Thailand, where it was planted between rows of natural rubber trees. Much of it is planted in Songkhla Province. Factories were established there to produce tapioca starch and tapioca pearls for export to Singapore and Malaysia. Over time, the area of planted cassava gradually decreased due to the encroachment of rubber trees. Cultivation then shifted to the east, to Chonburi and Rayong. As market demand increased, its cultivation was adopted by other provinces, especially in Isan.

== Types ==
Two types of cassava are grown in Thailand. Cassava grown in Thailand is mostly of the bitter type.

1. Sweet: It has a low level of cyanic acid. Its taste is not bitter and it can be consumed by humans and animals.
2. Bitter: It is poisonous, as it contains a high level of cyanic acid. It is not suitable for direct human consumption or for direct feeding to animals. It must be processed into flour, pellets, alcohol, or another derivative.

== Production ==
Cassava is grown in 48 of Thailand's 76 provinces. The total area of cassava plantations in Thailand during crop year 2015-2016 was about 8.8 million rai (1.41 million ha; 3.5 million acres), allowing the production of about 33 million tons of fresh roots. Fifty percent of cassava plantations in Thailand are in the northeast region. The five provinces with the largest cassava plantations are Nakhon Ratchasima, Kamphaeng Phet, Chaiyaphum, Sa Kaeo, and Chachoengsao.

The tapioca industry in Thailand has three types of production as follows:

- Native starch production (dry powder, slurry, and cake)
- Modified starch production
- Starch derivatives production (glucose, fructose, dextrose, maltose, sorbitol)

According to the Information and Communication Technology Bureau, Department of Industrial Works, there were 93 native starch factories as of 2007. Northeastern Thailand has the highest number of native starch factories (46 percent) followed by the east region (31 percent), central region (15 percent) and north region (eight percent) respectively. Native starch factories are typically in the same areas as tapioca plantations.

== Economics ==
Thailand produces 28-30 million tonnes of fresh cassava roots yearly from some 500,000 households, worth more than 100 billion baht. According to the Thai Confederation of Tapioca Farmers, the average household makes about 53 baht (US$1.70) per rai per month from tapioca cultivation.

Nigeria is the world's leading producer of tapioca, but Thailand is the world's largest exporter with at least half of the market. In 2017 it exported 11 million tonnes of tapioca products. Its export goal for 2018 is 10.6 million tonnes. Thailand accounts for about 60 percent of worldwide exports with an export value of some 80,000 million baht per year. Important markets include Japan, Taiwan, China and Indonesia. Tapioca starch from Thailand is also in demand by countries in Central America and South America.

The export price of tapioca products has dropped markedly from its highs in 2013. For example, in October 2016 the price of a ton of super high-grade Thai tapioca starch was US$315, down from US$483 in April 2013.

== See also ==
- Agriculture in Thailand
- Cassava
- Tapioca
