= Coconut production in Thailand =

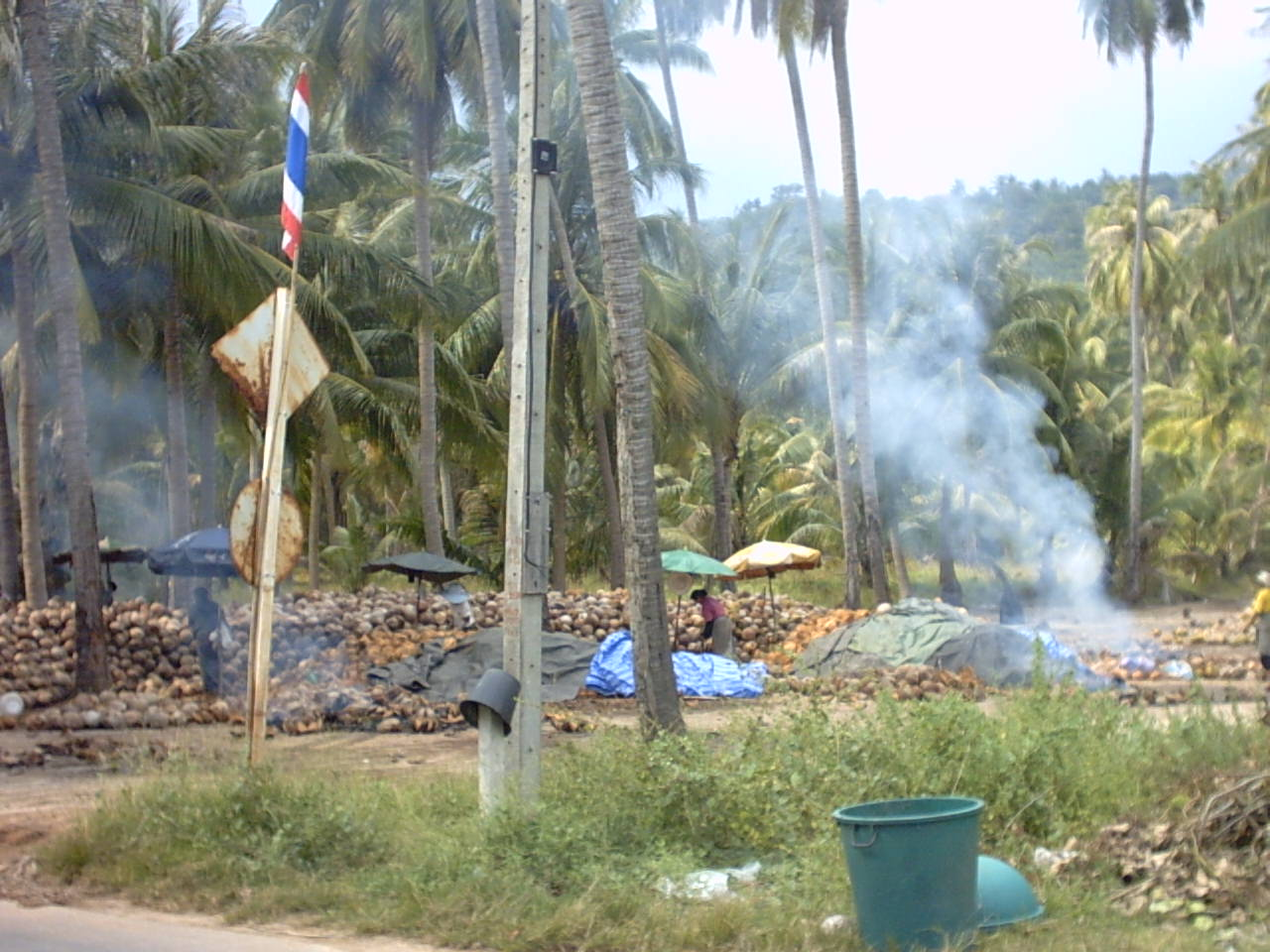
Coconut plantation, Thailand

Coconut production contributes to the national economy of Thailand. According to figures published in December 2009 by the Food and Agriculture Organization (FAO) of the United Nations, it is the world's sixth largest producer of coconuts, producing 1,721,640 tonnes in 2009. In 2012 it was reported that Thailand had 216,000 hectares of coconut palm plantations and produced 845 million whole coconuts.

As evidence of the importance of the coconut industry to the Thai economy, the Thai government has enacted strict standards for some categories of coconut products.

== See also ==
- Agriculture in Thailand
