= Golden Jubilee Museum of Agriculture =

Agricultural museum in Thailand

Coordinates: 14.118935°N 100.619348°E

The Golden Jubilee Museum of Agriculture, is an agricultural museum in Pathum Thani Province, Thailand.

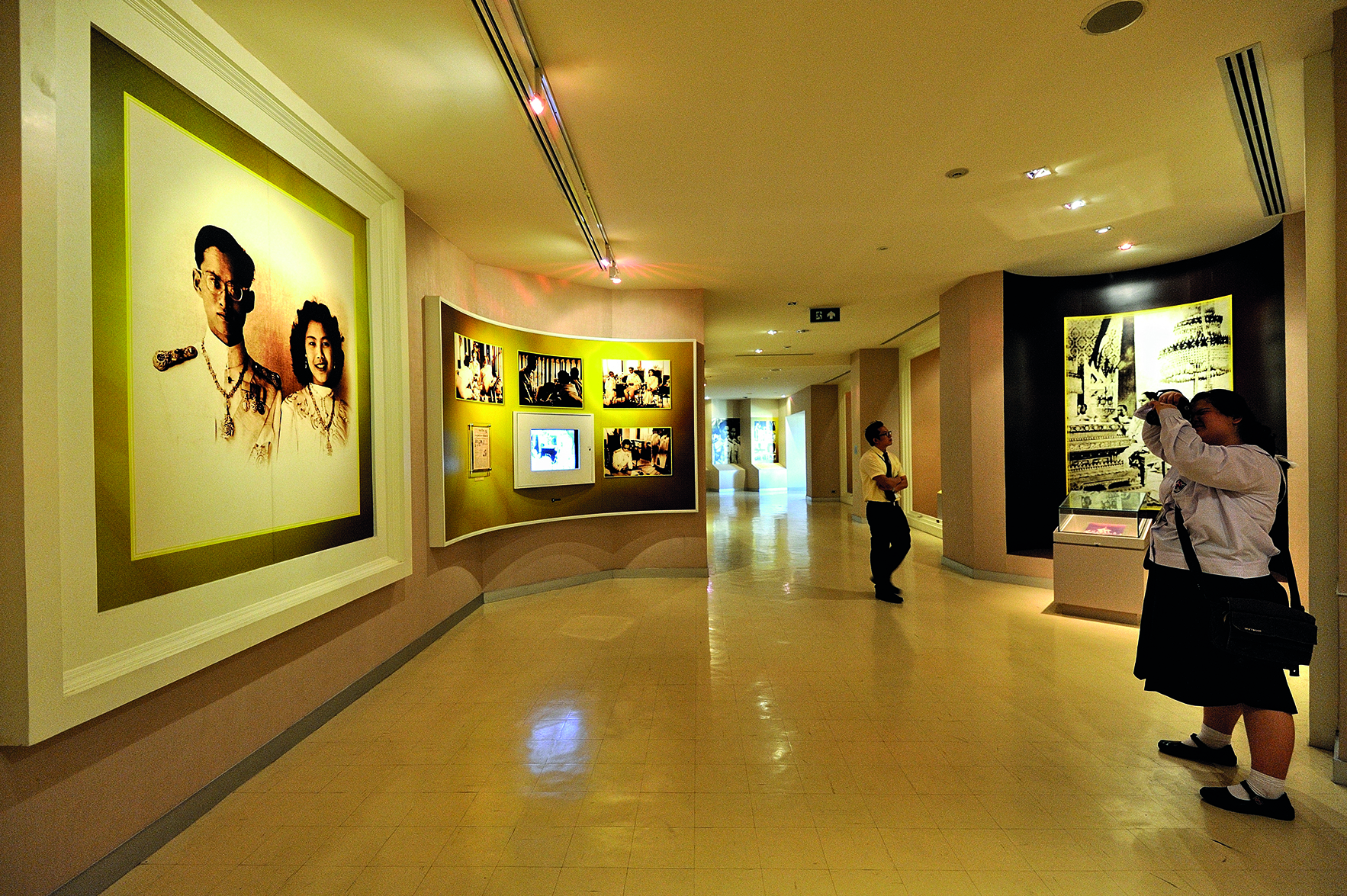
Portrait of King Bhumibol and Queen Sirikit inside museum

== History ==
The Ministry of Agriculture and Cooperatives established the Golden Jubilee Museum of Agriculture to commemorate Golden Jubilee of King Bhumibol Adulyadej in 1996. The king presided over the opening ceremony on 21 January 2002.

The purpose of the museum is to honour King Bhumibol's vision for sustainable agriculture based upon his philosophy of the "sufficiency economy".

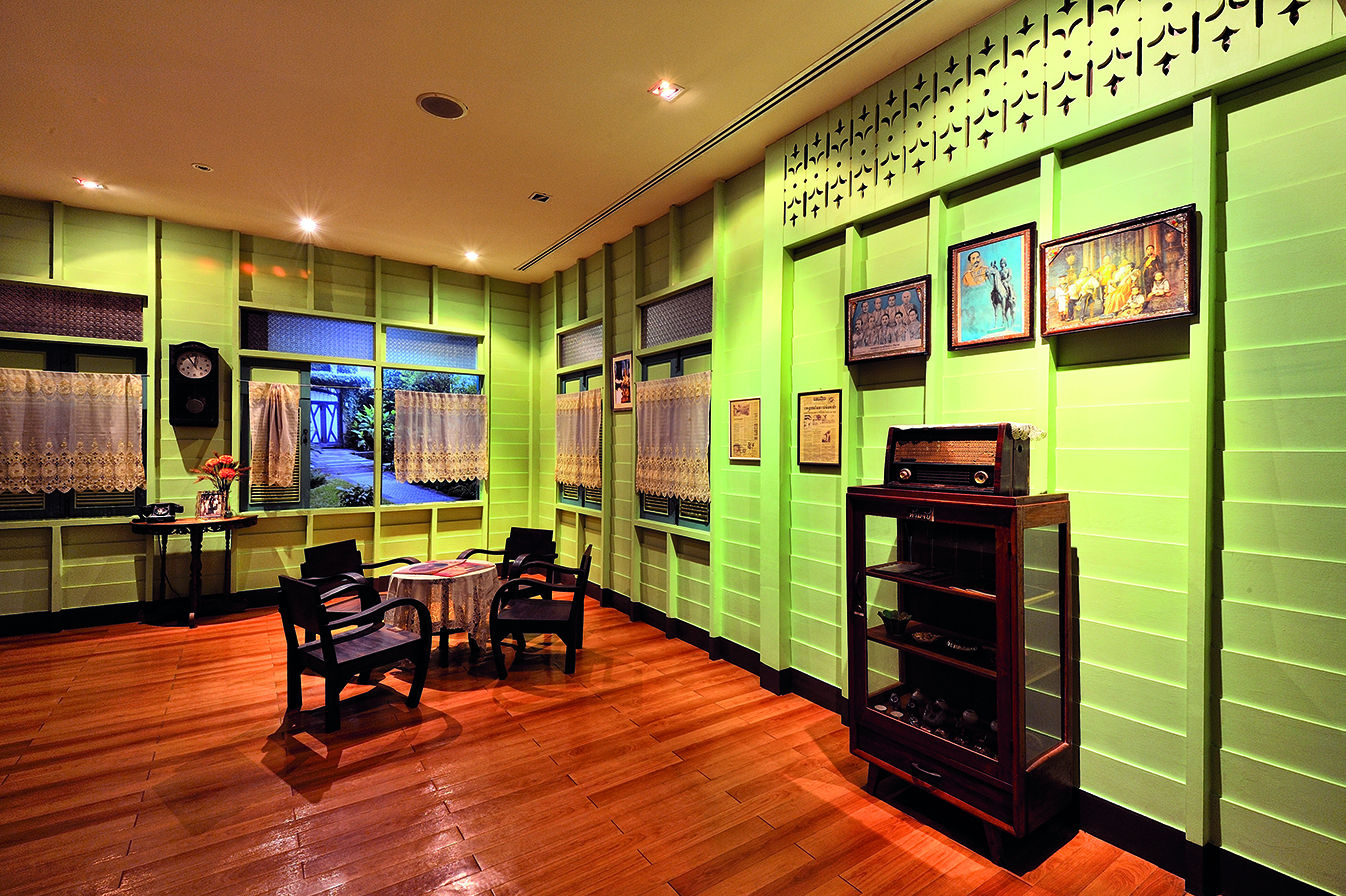
Golden Jubilee Museum
