= 1970s peasant revolts in Thailand =

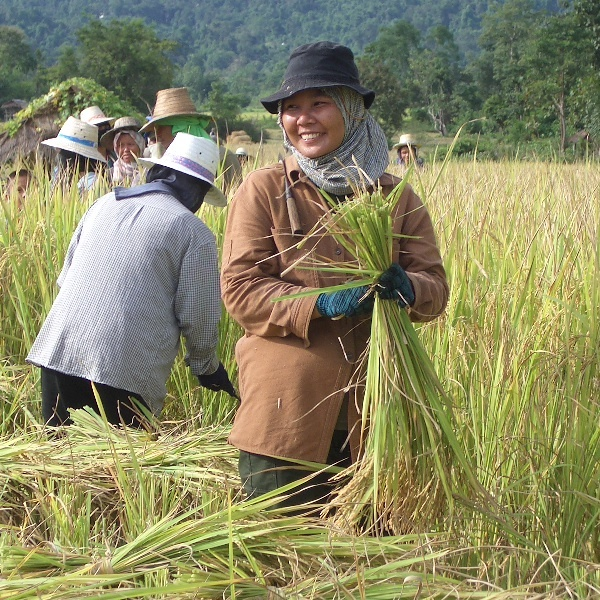
Thai farm workers

Thailand witnessed several uprisings by farmers from several central Thai provinces in the mid-1970s. Thailand, transitioning to democratic government after nearly forty years of dictatorship was beset by revolution involving several segments of the population. Farmers were one of several politicized groups that rioted on the streets. They implored Thai Prime Minister Thanom Kittikachorn to reduce their debt and ensure fair rice prices.

These appeals were unsuccessful, as the prime minister declined to meet with representatives of the farmers. The farmers subsequently organised collective action, including announcing that they would cease paying taxes and refusing to recognise the authority of the Thai state leadership. They also established an autonomous liberated zone. According to contemporary accounts and later scholarship, these actions were intended to address indebtedness, increase farmers' influence over rice crop prices, and improve their economic conditions.

The objectives of the farmers' movement included seeking greater recognition for farmers' contributions to the state and advocating treatment equal to that of their landowners. During the revolt, the Farmers Federation of Thailand (FFT), a national, autonomous Thai farmers organisation, emerged. The FFT played a leading role in campaigns in northern Thailand that contributed to the passage of the Land Rent Control Act (LRCA) of December 1974, which standardised and lowered rents on rice land.

Following the 14 October 1973 movement, farmers and their allies, including students and members of the professional classes, organised mass protests and campaigns calling for reforms aimed at improving the living conditions of farmers. These activities brought the movement into conflict with some landowners and state officials. In the following years, activists were subjected to harassment, and a number of FFT leaders were assassinated. Between March 1974 and September 1979, 21 FTT leaders were assassinated, with most of the killings occurring in the Chiang Mai region. According to historians, the assassination of FTT leaders contributed to an atmosphere of fear in the countryside and significantly weakened the FFT and the broader farmers' movement.

== Social and economic situation ==
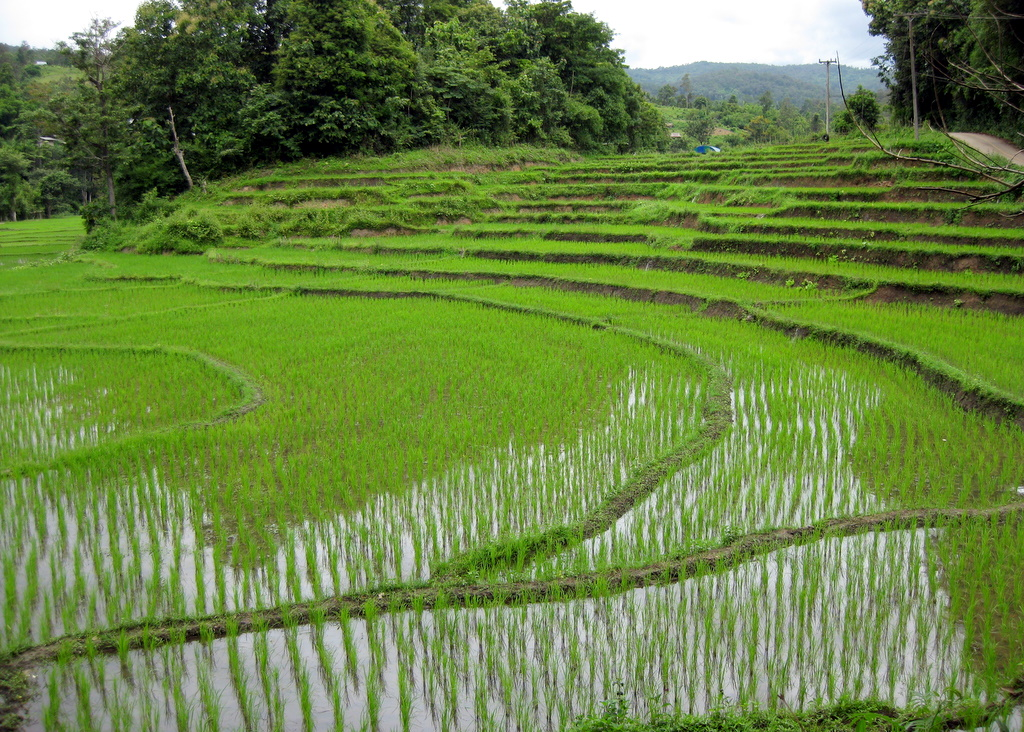
Rice fields, Chiang Mai Province

How easy to thresh from these stalks a stream of grain. Who but the farmer knows all the hardships involved? Drops of sweat, who cares to count how many. But drop by drop I can count every one of my worries. How many bulging sinews of mine, tear up from the earth what you put in your mouth?

— Jit Phumisak,

Major issues in Thai society were rural poverty and regional underdevelopment. Cities enjoyed sharp growth and along with it, a growing and prospering urban middle class. Composing up to 78 percent of Thailand's total labour force, peasant farmers formed the largest occupational group in Thailand. Agricultural output, mainly rice, accounted for nearly 30 percent of Thailand's GDP.

The producers of these commodities, however, were not among the beneficiaries. Farmers depended on rice sales to survive. To better protect themselves, they organised themselves and formed a national coalition of farmers against exploitative market conditions. Though the farmers attempted in vain to defend their livelihood and source of income, their efforts were systematically frustrated by governmental authorities in collusion with landlords and others with vested interests in ensuring that rice prices remained low. In the 1970s a Thai farmer's average per capita income was only US$49. In contrast, the average national per capita income was US$125, and that of urban residents stood at US$428.

=== The growing income gap ===
Year	Per capita income of farmers (baht) (A)	Per capita income of city dwellers (baht) (B)	A/B (%)
1960	1,044	6,434	16.2
1970	1,310	8,618	15.2
1975	1,433	10,061	14.2
1980	1,525	12,964	11.8
1985	1,724	15,110	11.4

Source: News report in Prachtnippatai, 23 Jul 1974. quoted from Akira Takahashi, "Thailand: Growing Land Problems", in Z. M. Ahmadi, ed., Land Reform in Asia, Geneva, 1976, p. 118.

Thailand had not previously suffered from the runaway population growth found in most developing nations. The productivity of its soil, along with its external environment, combined with a non-existent political culture, based on the tenets of respect and love for a hereditary monarch, had the effect of creating political passivity in Thailand's rural population. But several policy changes enacted by the government had an adverse effect on rural Thailand, particularly during the period of open politics from 1973 to 1976. The combination of a sudden uptick in Thailand's population along with the increasing scarcity of arable land led to increasing political and social conflict.

Invariably, tenancy and debts increased among farmers, especially in the north and central plains. Though there was increased interaction between farmers and governmental officials due to improved infrastructure and the increasing presence of the government in the countryside, the nature of these interactions was frequently negative. Farmers were distrustful and over a period of time finally reached their breaking point. They turned to political action to make their grievances known to the government. In an era of more open politics, there were instances of petitions against land rents and demonstrations leading to the emergence of the Farmer Federation of Thailand (FFT). The FFT frequently clashed with the ruling elite in its attempt to improve the lives of the Thai farmers.

== Rice production policies ==
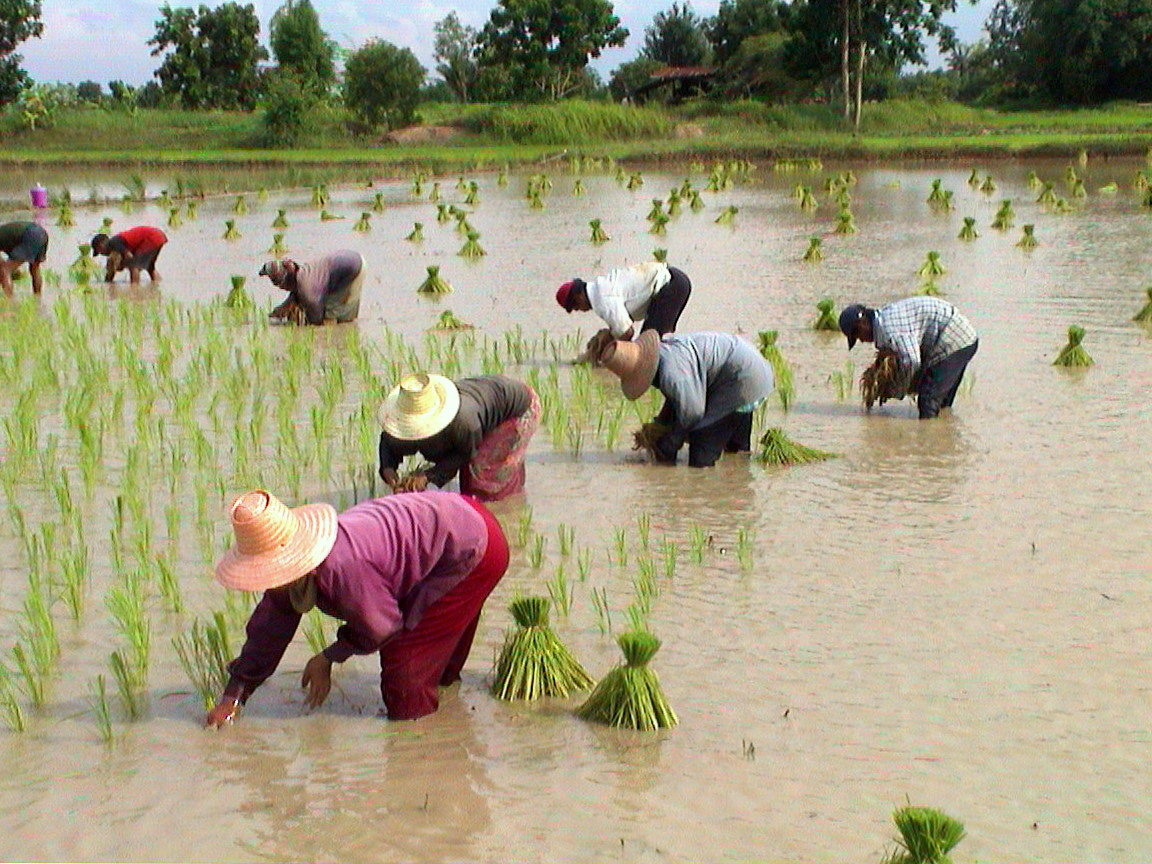
Rice farmers transplanting rice, Chaiyaphum Province

Rice is central to Thailand's economy and culture. Cultivation occupies approximately 55 percent of Thailand's arable land and is the staple food across all income brackets. Thailand in the 1970s invested heavily in infrastructure improvements, agricultural research, and road networks to increase its rice production. The use of technology, combined with advanced knowledge of rice strains and fertilisers, along with helpful governmental policies, increased rice production. From the 1950s to the 1970s, rice production per unit of land increased by almost 50 percent.

Concomitantly, the government sought to accelerate growth in urban areas. One of its policies was to tax the rice industry and use the profits to fund much-needed projects in the larger cities. Thai authorities levied taxes on rice exports known as the "rice premium". This increased tax revenues, while at the same time decreasing the price of rice domestically. The government, in enacting this policy, shifted from protecting the farmers to leaving the rice industry to market forces, often leading to unbridled profit taking.

Though technology had greatly improved rice production, it had not translated into success for peasant farmers. Escalating prices left many farmers unable to hold onto their lands. Many had to become tenants to sustain themselves. Despite uncertainty in the Thai economy, the government appeared unconcerned. Taxes were collected good year or bad, which further drove down farming profits.

The introduction of new technology meant that rice farming barriers to entry mounted, leaving most peasant farmers unable to own their land outright. Larger farming operations were able to meet the rising costs of these new technologies and were able to purchase fertiliser, improved rice strains, and machinery without much problem. The average farmer though, had to make a living as a manual labourer on a farm earning barely enough to feed himself and his family.

== Problems of tenancy and rural debt ==
The construction of new rural infrastructure was initiated and managed by the bureaucratic elite in Bangkok rather than by rural villagers. At the top, corruption was prevalent. High-ranking officials received kickbacks. While the government sought to implement measures to improve agricultural output, these projects in general did relatively little to improve farmer's lives. Instead, the agricultural sector was plagued by the growing issues of indebtedness and land shortages. The country's total agricultural debt was estimated at 143 million baht, with the bulk of the debt (78 percent) concentrated in Chiang Mai and the central plains.

Though indebtedness in rural areas was present as early as the 1930s, farmers during that period still owned their lands outright. Tenant farmers and absentee landlords were non-existent. A survey conducted by the National Statistical Office found that 40 percent of farmers were renting out part or all of their land they farmed in the central plains. In Chiang Mai and other northern regions, up to 18 percent of farmers were tenants, whereas in other areas of Thailand the figures were comparatively lower.

Eight years later, another study was conducted which found 56 percent of farmers in the central plains rented some of the lands they tilled while 27 percent did not own any land at all. In a decade, the rate of tenancy in the central area had more than doubled with only approximately 17 percent of farmers fully independent of landlords. The report also found that four of every five farming families were in debt for an aggregate sum of 16 billion baht. The average farm family debt was US$200, compared to an average family income of less than US$300 a year. Some of the families lived on US$25 or less a year.

A number of significant factors contributed to the higher rates of tenancy, rural indebtedness, and land rents in the north and central plains. It was found that the land holdings in the north were smaller than in any other region of the country, thus reducing efficiency. Farming was done on a much smaller scale, which combined with lower productivity, yielded low incomes.

=== Population growth in Thailand ===
As the Thai economy evolved with higher standards of living, farmers saw their incomes shrink. Small scale farming operations had to borrow from money lenders, usually middlemen involved in the rice trade or owners of rice mills. The loans made at high interest rates. The problems of land fragmentation and subdivision also contributed to problems in the north. A report submitted by the Food and Agricultural Organisation (FAO) found that subdivision of land holdings was growing rapidly in Thailand. Sub-divisions occurred mostly following the death of the landholder.

	1850	1911	1943	1958	1967	1973	1978
Population in millions	4	8	16	24	32	40	47

Source: Compiled from National Economic and Social Development Board (NESDB), Bangkok.

==== Relations between farmers and landlords ====
Aggravating the situation, farmers, often illiterate, were often cheated. When harvests were poor, farmers had no choice but to mortgage their land as collateral to obtain a loan. Should the farmer fail to repay the loan, he would forfeit his land. Farmers with a run of bad harvests, combined with high interest rates, would lose ownership of their land.

Farmers in the central and northern plains have suffered from severe indebtedness since the 1930s. By the 1970s, most of the farmers had lost their land to creditors. The government ignored this issue as Thai farmers lacked political clout. Farmers were seen as disorganised, scattered, and politically apathetic, accepting misfortune and poverty as their lot in life. This all changed in 1973, when farmers decided to take matters into their own hands and sought to change their lives.

== The political mobilization of farmers ==
1973 was a watershed year for Thai politics. The government transitioned from a military dictatorship to a moderate civilian government. This provided an opening for the political mobilisation and participation of various segments of society in the political affairs of the country. Social discontent and the urgent needs of oppressed classes formerly subjugated by authoritarian rule, were thrust into the forefront and these issues were openly raised. Labour disputes were suddenly discussed with great vigour.

Students and professional classes such as teachers and lawyers, fearful for their own long-term political survival, joined farmers to air their grievances. Student activists convinced farmers to organise themselves into a political body in order to pressure the government to act on their behalf. During 1973 and 1974, farmers took to the streets and protested against local district officers and other officials.

Tenant farmers in the north and on the central plains were particularly demonstrative. Activists helped to organise several complaints against land owners over land mortgages and unfair land rents and also against local officials for corruption. Thousands of farmers marched to the prime minister's office in Bangkok to demand the return of their lands from landlords, middlemen, and creditors. The demonstrations signaled the farmers' will and determination to implement policies which would change the landscape of the agricultural sector after years of abuse and neglect by Thai authorities.

In March 1974, farmers, supported by the NSCT (National Students Center of Thailand), staged their first large-scale protest, gaining nationwide attention for their demands to increase rice prices. From August to November 1974, land disputes were widespread and discontent was vented. Newspaper reports reported that approximately 7,000 farmers from eight different provinces threatened to relinquish their Thai identification cards and go about setting up a "liberated area" unless the government met their demands.

On 19 November 1974, the assembled farmer representatives in Bangkok declared the formation of the Farmers Federation of Thailand (FFT). FFT then handed the government a list of demands. The government acceded to some of the demands of the FFT, albeit slowly. A few half-hearted agrarian reform laws were passed, including the seed certification law, a land rental law, and a moderate land reform law. The FFT clamoured for the Land Rent Control Act (LRCA) to be ratified and its laws to be made applicable to the whole country. It was finally enacted in December 1974.

The 1974 act was more extensive and differed from an earlier 1950 law in terms of application, terms of rent, and terms of enforcement. The 1974 act stipulated the establishment of provincial and district committees to oversee its implementation and administration and also to mediate conflicts between tenants and farmers. The officials on these committees were to be selected from the sub-districts where there was land tenancy. By involving farmers directly in the administration of the law, farmers were to be entitled to a fair hearing from fellow farmers rather than government bureaucrats.

The 1974 act also established the need to assess land quality and harvest success when determining rental amounts, as opposed to the 1950s act which stipulated rental amounts from 5 to 25 percent of the harvest irrespective of other factors. The act thus brought welcome relief from exorbitant rents.

== Assassinations of FFT leaders ==
The three years between 14 October 1973 and 6 October 1976 were a tumultuous period filled with political possibilities and change in Thailand. Groups whose political action was restricted under military rule organised and protested in unprecedented numbers. Thais from all walks of life transcended class and social status to challenge injustice. But throughout 1975 and 1976, students, journalists, socialists, employees, and farmers were subject to growing harassment, intimidation, threats, and finally assassination. From March 1974 to August 1975, approximately 21 FFT leaders were murdered.

It was thought that these murders were committed to intimidate. All those murdered were active FFT members. The killings took place within a short span of time. In many instances, the murders pointed to the work of a highly professional assassin and not to random murder by an angry villager motivated by revenge.

=== Murdered FFT activists ===
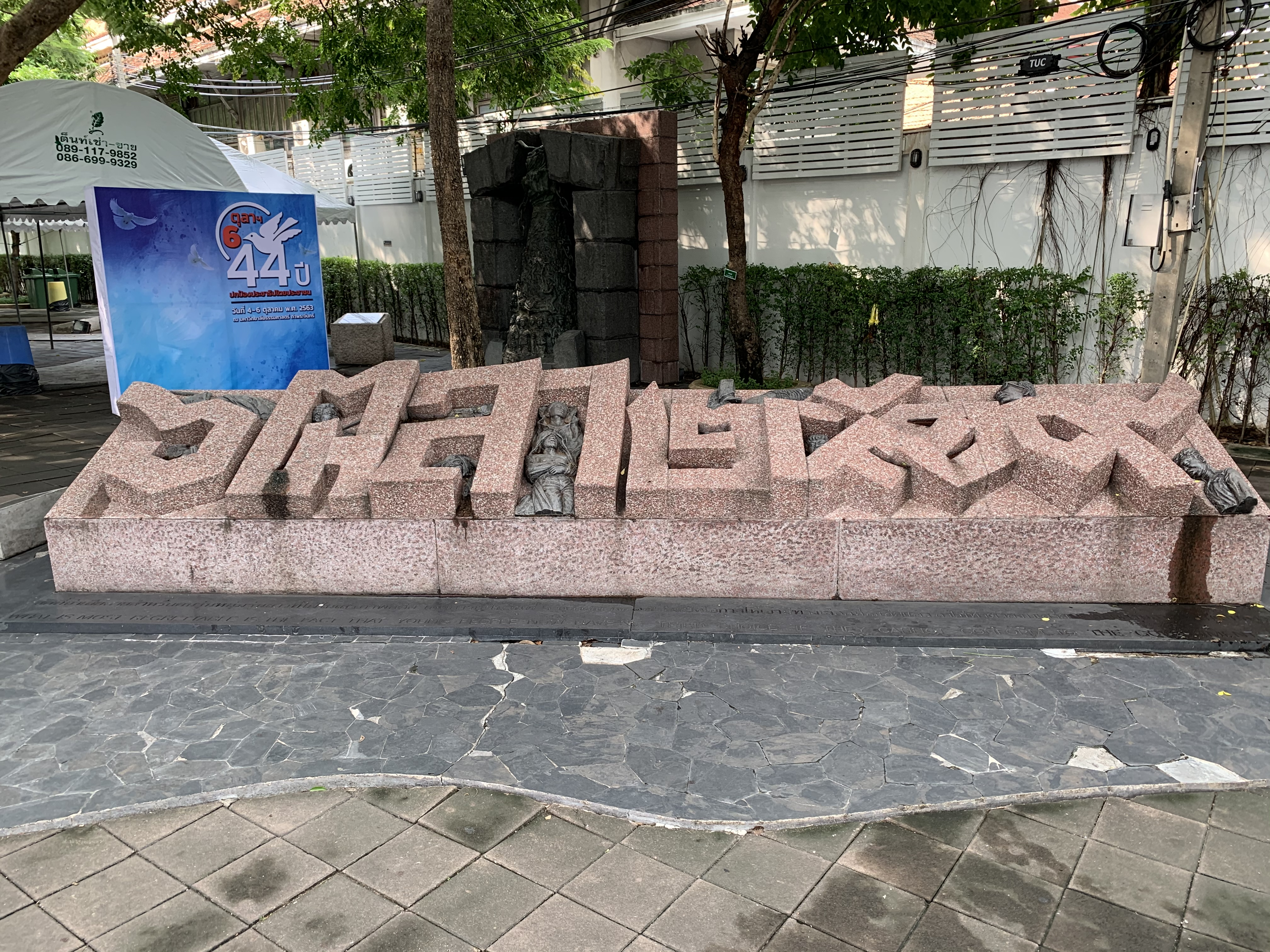
6 October 1976 Memorial, Thammasat University

Name	FFT position	Province	Date assassinated
Suit Sridej	Representative to executive committee	Phitsanulok	31 Mar 1974
Mrs Bunting Sirak	Member (ordinary villager)	Phitsanulok	Oct 1974
Boonma Somprasith	Provincial committee member	Ang Thong	Feb 1975
Hieng Sinmak	Representative to executive committee	Lamphun	6 Apr 1975
Aye Thongtoe	Representative to executive committee	Lamphun	13 Apr 1975
Ngoen Larwong	District committee member	Udon	21 Apr 1975
Mongkol Suknoon	Leader, Provincial Branch	Phichit	May 1975
Tawil (last name not reported)	Member (ordinary member)	Phichit	May 1975
Tawil Mungtunya	Representative to executive committee	Korat	26 May 1975
Charoen Songnark	District committee member	Korat	26 May 1975
Jar Jakrawan	Leader, District Branch	Chiang Mai	13 Jun 1975
Put Ponglung-ga	Information not available	Information not available	22 Jun 1975
Keo Pongchakum	Information not available	Information not available	22 Jun 1975
Prasert Chomamarit	Leader, district branch	Chiang Mai	3 Jul 1975
Som Jandeng	Leader, district branch	Chiang Mai	Jul 1975
Amnuay (last name not reported)	Leader, District Branch	Chiang Mai	Jul 1975
Klieng Mai-iem	Deputy leader, district branch	Lamphang	20 Jul 1975
Metta (last name not reported)	Representative to executive committee	Chonburi	Jul 1975
Prasart Srimuang	Representative to executive committee	Surin	8 Jul 1975
Intha Sribunruang	Vice president, FFT; president, northern branch; leader, provincial branch	Chiang Mai	Aug 1975
Sawat Tadawan	Leader, District Branch	Chiang Mai	Aug 1975

Source: David Morell: Political Conflict in Thailand: Reform, Reaction, Revolution.

Assassinated early were ordinary members of the FFT. As the killings continued, top leaders such as Intha became targets. The killings were a clear warning to FFT leaders to cease their activities if they wished to remain alive. The murder campaign ultimately derailed FFT efforts. The organisation ceased growing and diminished as a political party. By 1976, the party was seldom heard of again. The FFT had a small group of important individuals who were experienced and familiar with the complexities of the Land Control Act. With their murders and others afraid for their lives, the FFT collapsed.

Thirty years on, various issues surrounding this period of political possibility, the imaginings of a different and fair future for the ordinary people of Thailand and the death of those dreams, remains unresolved and understudied. Thongchai Winichakul, a prominent Southeast Asian scholar, argues that the massacre that took place at Thammasat University and the assassinations of FFT farmers continue to be shrouded in silence and fear.

== See also ==
- 1973 Thai student uprising
- Agriculture in Thailand
