= Agriculture in Thailand =

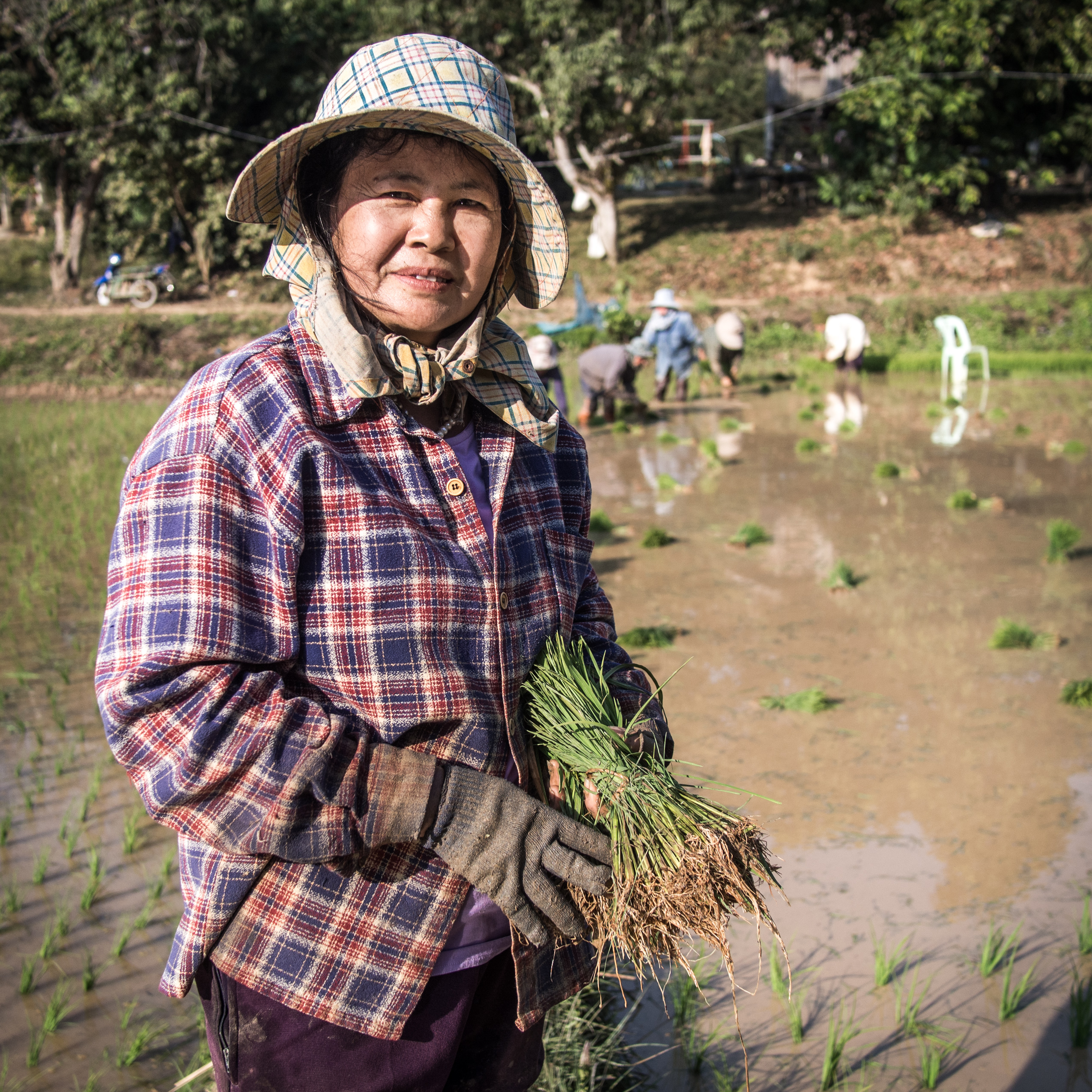
Thai farmer with rice seedlings

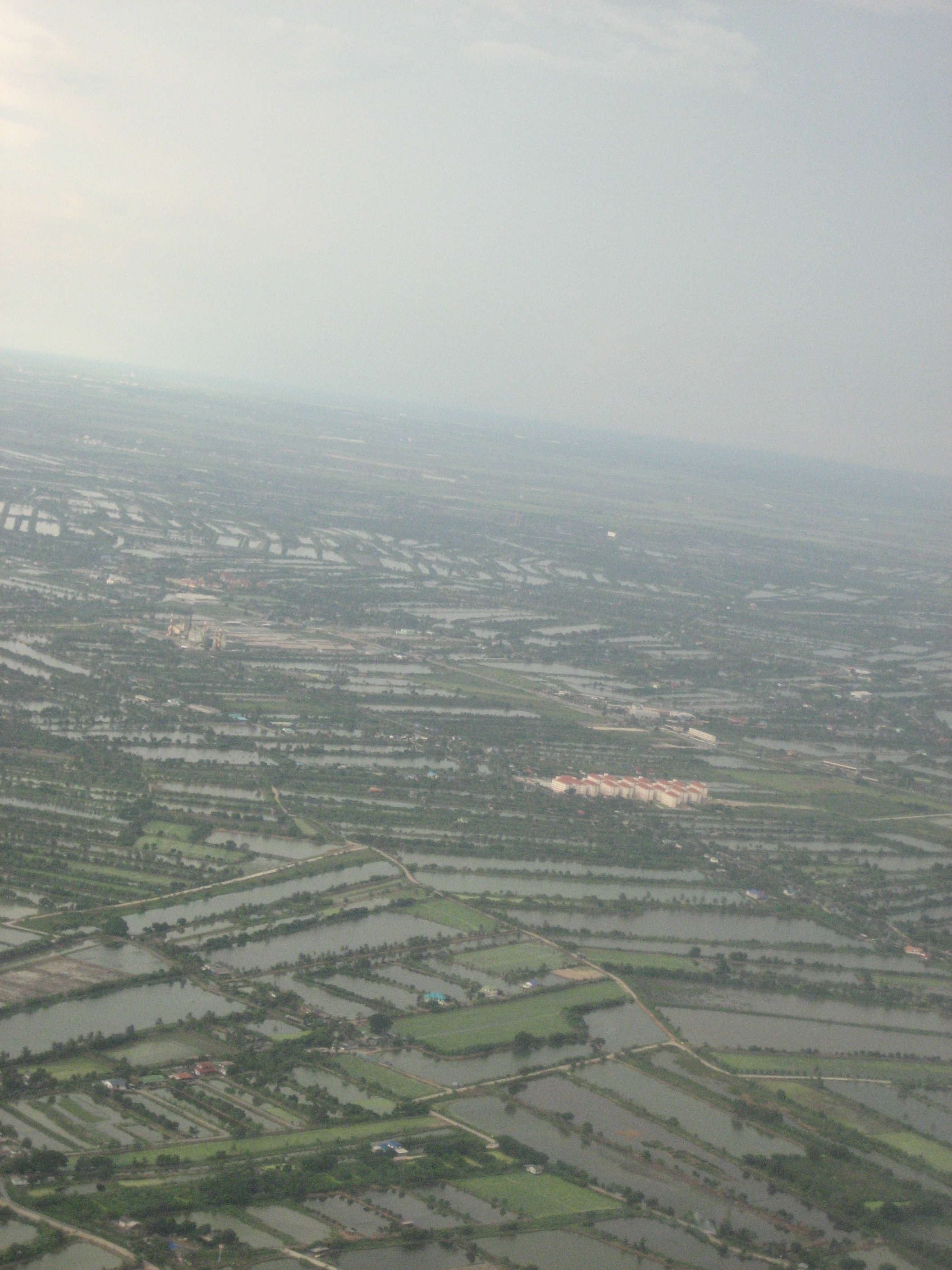
Agricultural areas near Bangkok

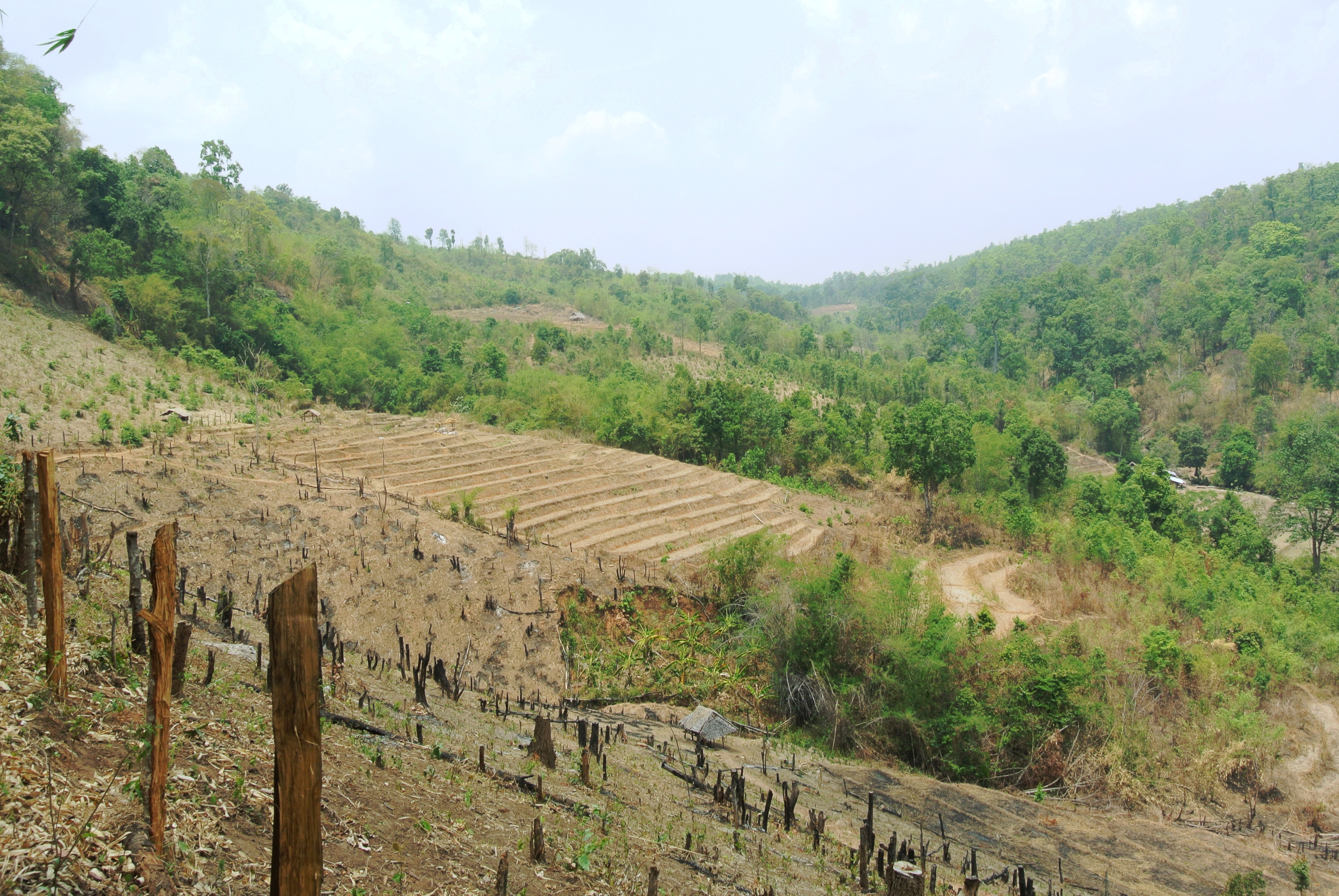
Land cultivated by the Karen tribe in northern Thailand: controlled burn in the foreground and agricultural terraces.

Agriculture in Thailand is highly competitive, diversified and specialized and its exports are very successful internationally. Rice is the country's most important crop, with some 60 percent of Thailand's 13 million farmers growing it on almost half of Thailand's cultivated land. Thailand is a major exporter in the world rice market. Rice exports in 2014 amounted to 1.3 percent of GDP. Agricultural production as a whole accounts for an estimated 9–10.5 percent of Thai GDP. Forty percent of the population work in agriculture-related jobs. The farmland they work was valued at US$2,945/rai ($18,410/ha; $7,450/acre) in 2013. Most Thai farmers own fewer than eight ha (50 rai) of land.

Other agricultural commodities produced in significant amounts include fish and fishery products, tapioca, rubber, grain, and sugar. Exports of industrially processed foods such as canned tuna, pineapples, and frozen shrimp are on the rise.

== History ==
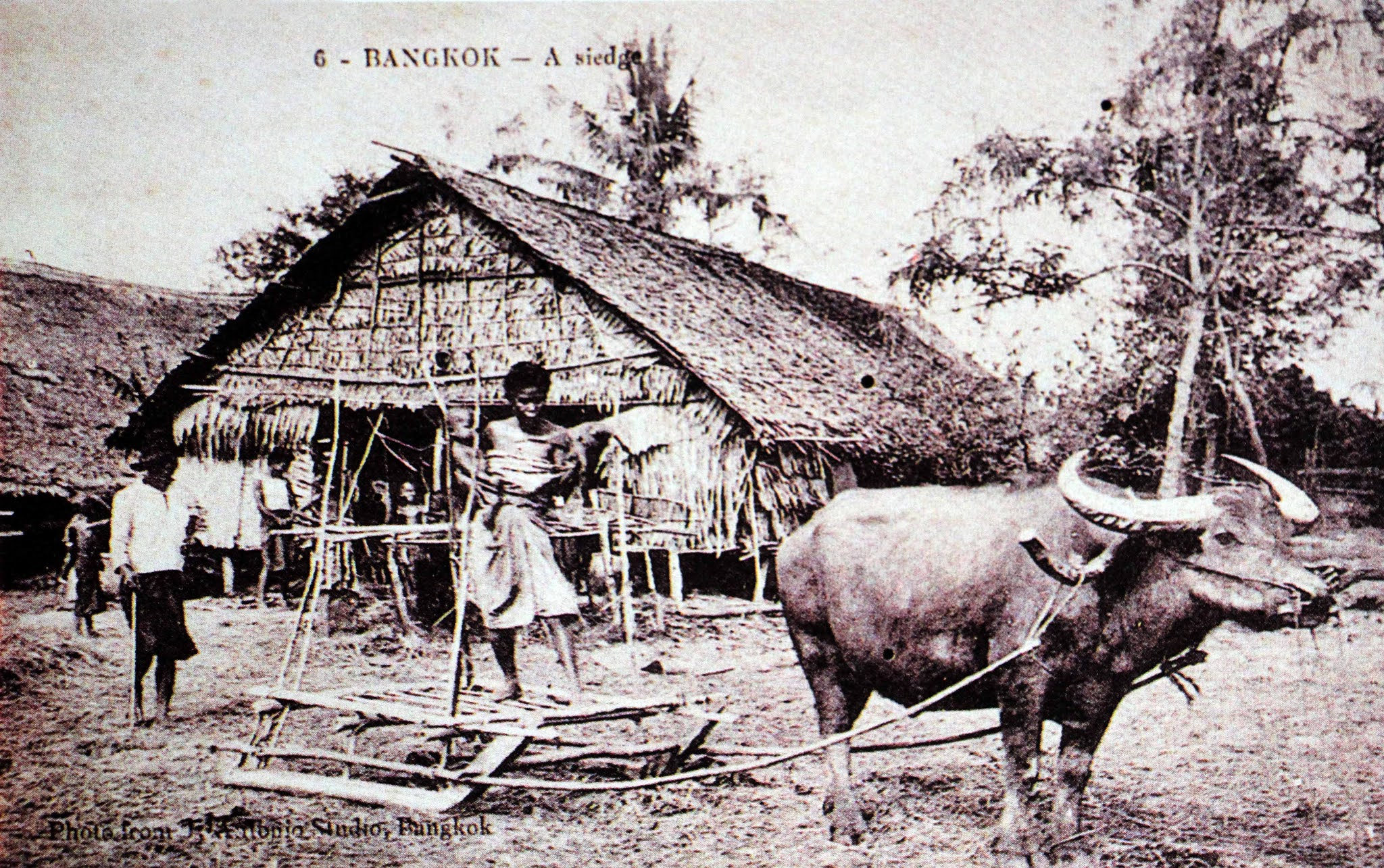
A Siedge in Bangkok (Farmhouse) photo, c1890

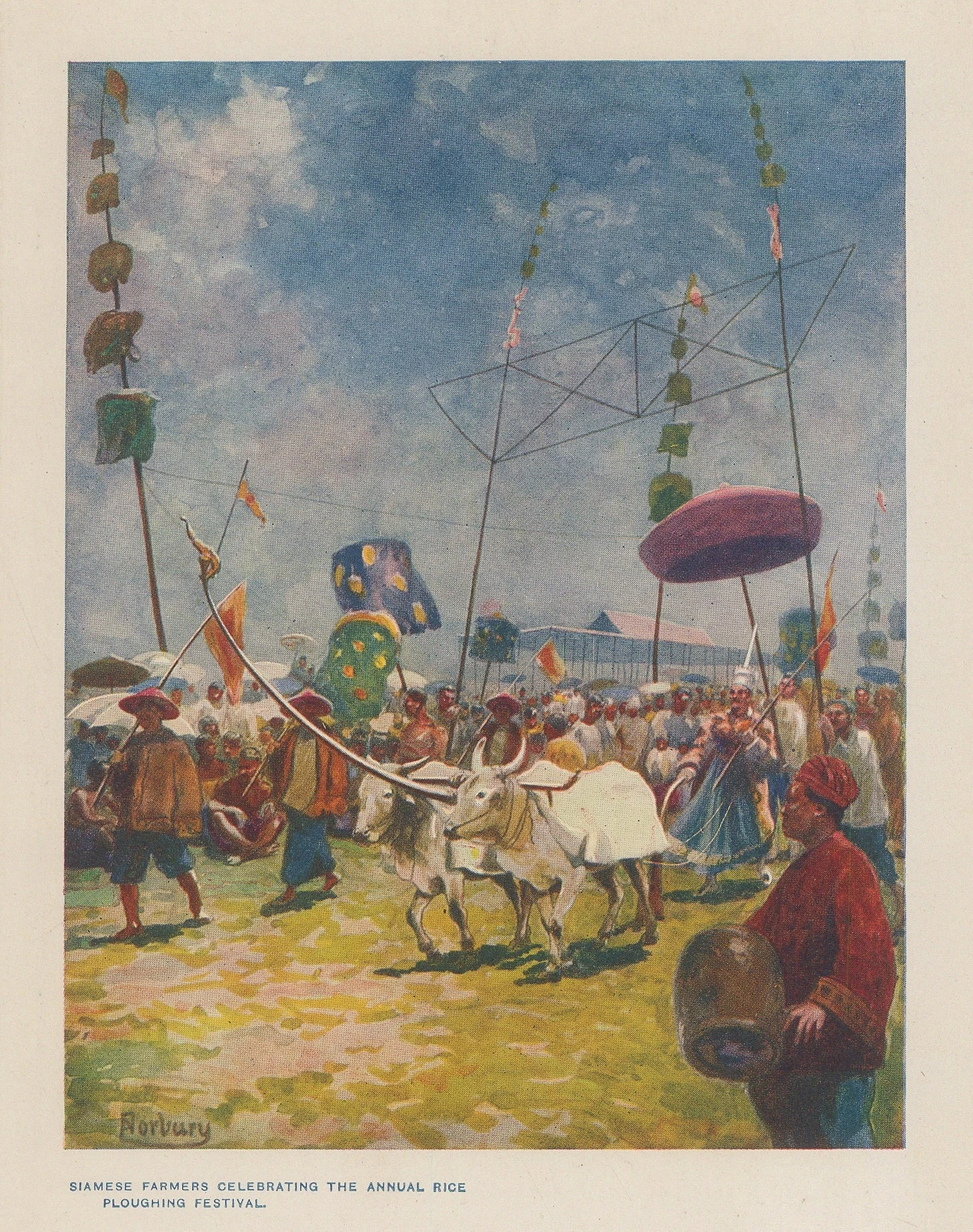
Siamese Rice Ploughing Festival (Thailand), 1913

After the Neolithic Revolution, the societal structure in the region transitioned from hunting and gathering to agro-cities, eventually leading to state-religious empires. Since around 1000 CE, the cultivation of Tai wet glutinous rice has been a pivotal aspect of the local administrative structures, reflecting the pragmatic nature of a society that consistently produced a surplus suitable for trade. This agricultural system, which remains significant, underscores the ongoing importance of rice agriculture for Thailand's national security and economic prosperity.

Since the 1960s, agricultural advancements have significantly impacted employment and living standards in Thailand. Unemployment has decreased markedly, dropping from over 60 percent to under 10 percent in the early 2000s. Concurrently, there has been a notable reduction in food prices and hunger rates. For instance, the number of households experiencing hunger dropped from 2.55 million in 1988 to 418,000 in 2007. Additionally, child malnutrition rates declined from 17 percent in 1987 to seven percent in 2006. These improvements have been attributed to a combination of strong state involvement in investment in infrastructure, education, and access to credit, as well as successful private initiatives in the agribusiness sector. This comprehensive approach has facilitated Thailand's evolution into an industrialized economy.

=== Agriculture in transition ===
Agriculture expanded during the 1960s and 1970s as it had access to new land and unemployed labour. Between 1962 and 1983, the agricultural sector grew by 4.1 percent a year on average and in 1980 it employed over 70 percent of the working population. Yet, the state perceived developments in the agricultural sector as necessary for industrialisation and exports were taxed to keep domestic prices low and raise revenue for state investment in other areas of the economy.

As other sectors developed, labourers went in search of work in other sectors of the economy and agriculture was forced to become less labour-intensive and more industrialised. Aided by state laws forcing banks to provide cheap credit to the agricultural sector and by providing its own credit through the Bank for Agriculture and Agricultural Co-operatives (BAAC). The state further invested in education, irrigation, and rural roads. The result was that agriculture continued to grow at 2.2 percent between 1983 and 2007, but also that agriculture now only provides half of rural jobs as farmers took advantage of the investment to diversify.

As agriculture declined in relative financial importance in terms of income, with rising industrialization and Westernisation of Thailand from the 1960s, it continued to provide the benefits of employment and self-sufficiency, rural social support, and cultural custody. Technical and economic globalisation have continued to change agriculture to a food industry which exposed smallholders to such an extent that environmental and human values have declined markedly in all but the poorer areas.

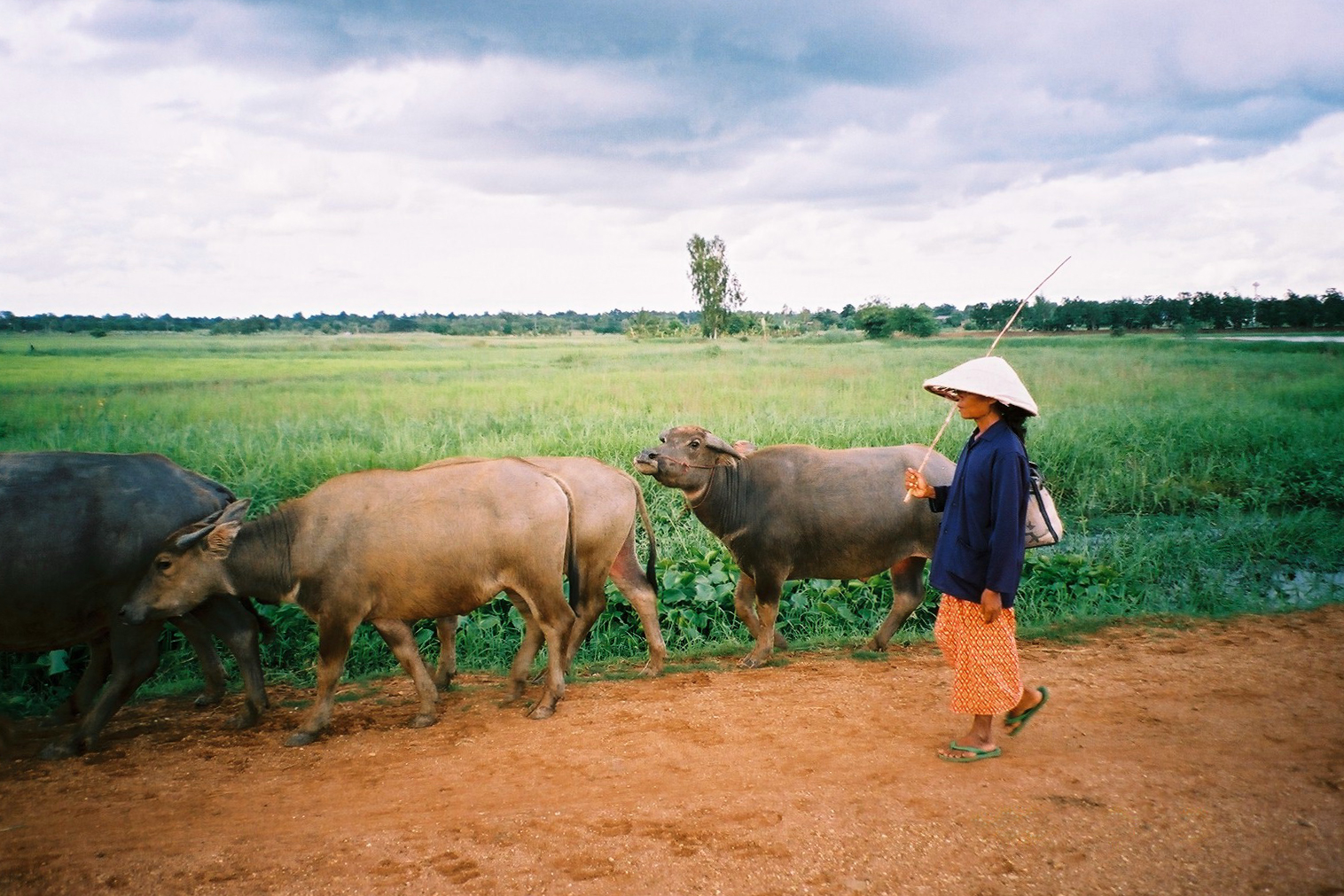
Herding water buffalo, Chaiyaphum Province.

Agribusiness, both privately and government-owned, expanded from the 1960s and subsistence farmers were partly viewed as a past relic which agribusiness could modernise. However, intensive integrated production systems of subsistence farming continued to offer efficiencies that were not financial, including social benefits which have now caused agriculture to be treated as both a social and financial sector in planning, with increased recognition of environmental and cultural values. "Professional farmers" made up 19.5 percent of all farmers in 2004.

Thailand's military government in 2016 introduced "Thailand 4.0", an economic model designed to break Thailand out of the middle income trap. For agriculture, Thailand 4.0 aims at a seven-fold increase in average annual income of farmers from 56,450 baht to 390,000 baht by 2037. It is unclear is how this goal is to be reached, given that Thai farms are small – 43 percent of them are smaller than 10 rai, and another 25 percent are between 10–20 rai. These small plots are already mechanized – 90 percent use machinery. Concomitantly, agricultural research budgets have dropped from 0.9 percent of agricultural GDP in 1994 to only 0.2 percent in 2017. Meanwhile, the population ages. The World Bank estimates that by 2040, 42 percent of Thais will be over 65 years old.

The debt profile of small-scale Thai farmers is perilous. The UN estimates that Thai farmers who owned their own land declined from 44 percent in 2004 to just 15 percent in 2011. Farmers have accumulated 338 billion baht in debt. In 2013, the average household debt in Thailand's northeast was 78,648 baht, slightly lower than the national average of 82,572 baht, according to Thailand's Office of Agricultural Economics (OAE). But the region's average monthly household income, at 19,181 baht, was also lower than the national average, 25,194 baht, according to the National Statistics Office. New technologies have also pushed up the entry cost of farming and made it harder for farmers to own their land and fund production. Many farmers have turned to loan sharks to finance their operations. In 2015, nearly 150,000 farmers borrowed 21.59 billion baht from these lenders, according to the Provincial Administration Department.

== Production ==
Thailand produced in 2018:

- 104.3 million tons of sugarcane (4th largest producer in the world, only behind Brazil, India and China);
- 32.1 million tons of rice (6th largest producer in the world);
- 31.6 million tons of cassava (2nd largest producer in the world, just behind Nigeria);
- 15.4 million tonnes of palm oil (3rd largest producer in the world, behind Indonesia and Malaysia);
- 5 million tons of maize;
- 4.7 million tons of natural rubber (largest producer in the world);
- 3.8 million tonnes of mango (including mangosteen and guava) (3rd largest producer in the world, only behind India and China);
- 2.1 million tons of pineapple (4th largest producer in the world, only behind Costa Rica, Philippines and Brazil);
- 1 million tons of banana;
- 1 million tons of vegetable;
- 885 thousand tons of coconut (9th largest producer in the world);
- 516 thousand tons of orange;

In addition to smaller productions of other agricultural products.

== Industries ==
=== Financials ===
Thailand's food exports average one trillion baht annually. Locally consumed foods earn two trillion baht annually in the domestic market. Thailand is a leading food exporter: rice is the chief export, accounting for about 17.5 percent of all food exports, followed by chicken, sugar, processed tuna, tapioca flour, and shrimp. Thailand's largest export markets are Japan, China, Vietnam, Indonesia, Myanmar, Cambodia, Malaysia, and the Philippines. Thailand's food exports accounted for 2.5 percent of the world food trade in 2019. Food imports in 2019 amounted to 401 billion baht, down slightly.

=== Food crops ===
==== Coconuts ====
Thai coconut plantations occupy about one million rai of land and produce 800 million coconuts per year. But Thailand consumes more coconuts than it produces. To redress the shortfall, the Commerce Ministry approves coconut imports, which have since glutted the market. As of 2018 coconuts are sold for five to six baht per fruit. Thai growers claim that, given harvest and delivery fees of 2.5 baht each, their profit is about one baht per fruit, or 5,000 baht per rai per year, lower than the minimum wage. In 2017, Thailand imported 416,124 tonnes of coconuts worth 4.62 billion baht: 384,102 tonnes from Indonesia; 15,613 tonnes from Vietnam; 2,864 tonnes from Myanmar; and 13,524 tonnes from Malaysia.

==== Cowpea ====
Aphis craccivora is a pest of cowpea.

==== Dairy ====
Thailand has a raw milk production capacity of 2,800 tonnes a day, or just over one million tonnes per year (2015). Forty percent of production goes to a school milk programme and the rest to the commercial dairy sector. According to the Agriculture Ministry, Thailand is the largest producer and exporter of dairy products in ASEAN.

Thailand's School Milk Programme was established in 1985, in response to farmers protests in 1984 on unsold milk. "The principle [sic] objective of the National School Milk Programme is to support the Thai dairy industry, by providing an outlet for locally produced milk....providing milk to the young at an early stage, will...[develop] a taste for milk and hence a market for the future."

==== Palm oil ====
Thailand is the world's third largest producer of crude palm oil, producing approximately two million tonnes per year, or 1.2 percent of global output. Ninety-five percent of Thai production is consumed locally. Almost 85 percent of palm plantations and extraction mills are in south Thailand. At year-end 2016, 4.7 to 5.8 million rai were planted in oil palms, employing 300,000 farmers, mostly on small landholdings of 20 rai. ASEAN as a region accounts for 52.5 million tonnes of palm oil production, about 85 percent of the world total and more than 90 percent of global exports. Indonesia accounts for 52.2 percent of world exports. Malaysian exports total 37.9 percent. The biggest consumers of palm oil are India, the European Union, and China, with the three consuming nearly 50 percent of world exports. Thailand's Department of Internal Trade (DIT) usually sets the price of crude palm oil and refined palm oil. Thai farmers have a relatively low yield compared to those in Malaysia and Indonesia. Thai palm oil crops yield 4–17 percent oil compared to around 20 percent in competing countries. In addition, Indonesian and Malaysian oil palm plantations are 10 times the size of Thai plantations.

==== Potato ====
Grown year-round in the northwest highlands.

===== Phytophthora infestans =====
The JP-2 genotype - also known as SIB-1, a subpopulation of A1 with a IIa mitochondrial haplotype – was found here by Akino et al 2010, and is genetically close to European populations. It is shared with Japan, China, and Korea. TH-1 (in the Ia mtDNA haplotype, of the A2 mating type) is shared with southwest China and Nepal, as reported for samples from 1994 to 1997 by Guo et al 2010. The US-1 population – a subtype of A1 in the Ib mt haplotype – is shared with China, India, Nepal, Japan, Taiwan, and Vietnam. It is first known in Asia from a Thai sample from 1981, but not reported until Saville and Ristaino 2020. A2 was unknown here until a restriction fragment length polymorphism (TH-1) was found in a 1994 sample by Gotoh et al 2005. Other samples from the same year from Chiang Mai, analysed by Nishimura et al 1999, showed both A1 (specifically US-1) and A2 (specifically a metalaxyl-sensitive genotype) on potato, but only US-1 on tomato. Twenty-five samples from 2000 to 2002 were found (by Petchaboon et al 2014) to have RG57s that matched European populations of the IIa mtDNA haplotype, of the A1 mating type – another two being other A1s. They used Day et al 2004's nomenclature for this almost universal potato parasite lineage, calling it RF006. This result was confirmed by a pers. comm. from employees of Agriculture Victoria in 2020, who know it as the simple sequence repeat genotype EU 8 A1 from samples they have from 2009 from Thailand. This is probably the same lineage that was found in 2006–2009 samples and reported by Jaimasit and Prakob in 2010 – 117 of them all being A1, IIa. Their samples were mostly metalaxyl-sensitive but with some -intermediate and some -resistant.

Rice production in Thailand represents a significant portion of the Thai economy and labor force.[1] In 2017, the value of all Thai rice traded was 174.5 billion baht, about 12.9% of all farm production.[2] Of the 40% of Thais who work in agriculture, 16 million of them are rice farmers by one estimate.[3][4]

==== Soybeans ====
Thailand produces only 60,000 metric tons (66,000 short tons) of soybeans a year, meeting only two percent of a total demand nearing three million tonnes. Thailand imports about two million tonnes annually to meet a growing demand from the livestock and aquaculture sectors both in Thailand and neighbouring countries. Poultry farms and hog operations drive demand in the livestock sector. In aquaculture, shrimp farms are the major consumer of soybean meal. Soybean production in the country has fallen in the past several years due to high production costs largely attributed to wage hikes. Farmers also complain of lower profitability compared with maize and off-season rice.

==== Sugar ====
Thailand's first sugar mill was built in 1938 in Lampang Province. As of 2020, Thailand is the world's second-largest sugar exporter, after Brazil. The Office of Cane and Sugar Board (OCSB) forecasts that in the 2016–2017 crop year Thailand is expected produce 91–92 million tonnes of sugarcane, or 9.1–9.2 million tonnes of sugar, down by three million tonnes from the previous 2015–2016 harvest due to drought early in the growing season and excessive rain during the harvest season. In 2018, Thailand exported over 11 million tonnes of sugar, earning 115 billion baht in revenue.

===== Governmental interventions =====
In 2010 the Thai government initiated a program to encourage rice farmers to switch to growing sugarcane. The government's policy offered a 2,000 baht per rai subsidy for paddy fields converted to other crops. The government amended a law restricting the number of processing plants. Thailand's 54 sugarcane processing plants were then short of 100 million tonnes of raw cane to meet demand. A ready market for sugarcane and the falling price of rice made changing crops irresistible. As a result, sugarcane plantations in Thailand increased from 9.5 million rai to 12 million rai between 2013 and 2019. In 2018, the chairman of Mitr Phol, the world's fifth largest sugar producer, claimed that a one rai plot of sugar cane could result in up to 9,600 baht in farmer income compared with just 3,500 baht for one rai of rice. The government also subsidizes sugar cane production with a handout of 50 baht per tonne, up to 5,000 tonnes.

The Industry Ministry's Office of Cane and Sugar Board has plans to increase the country's total sugarcane plantations to 16 million rai by 2026 (from 6.5 million rai in 2007–2008). The goal is to boost raw sugarcane output from 105.96 million tonnes in 2015 to 180 million tonnes by 2026, netting 20.4 million tonnes of refined sugar. The transition has not been without controversy, mainly due to undesirable environmental impacts such as air pollution and cane farmers use of between 1.5–2 liters of paraquat per rai of sugarcane, and sugarcane's voracious appetite for water—2000 millimeters of rainfall during its growth cycle—around five times more than typical food crops. One kilogram of cane sugar represents 145 liters of water, significant, but far less than rice: 2,500 liters of water per one kilogram of rice.

===== Field burning =====
Thailand in the early-21st century has suffered from increasing levels of air pollution. Field burning has been identified as a key contributor. In addition to releasing CO_{2}, sugarcane burning emits acidic fine particles, which have an adverse impact on air quality and human health.

Sugarcane is harvested either manually or mechanically using a sugarcane harvester. Before hand harvesting the sugarcane field is burned. Mechanical harvesting does not require field burning. The residue left in the field by the combine can serve as mulch for the next planting, although some farmers persist in burning it. Mechanical harvesting requires substantial capital outlays for machinery, thus much of Thailand's sugarcane is hand harvested. Government policy continues to allow sugar mills to purchase burnt sugarcane, gradually reducing its proportion until phaseout in 2022. The government's sugarcane plan makes no mention of agricultural burning as the primary producer of air pollution. Instead, the government cites "outdoor burning of refuse" as a culprit. A ban on the acceptance of burnt cane, coupled with measures to regulate sugarcane cultivation and milling would solve the problem.

===== Climate impact =====
Models crafted by researchers at Kasetsart University project that, due to changes in climate and diversion of land to non-agricultural uses, future sugarcane yield, harvested area, and production are projected to decrease by 24–33%, 1–2%, and 25–35% respectively in the period 2046–2055 from the baseline years 1989–2016.

==== Tapioca ====
Tapioca (cassava) is grown in 48 of Thailand's 76 provinces. The total area of tapioca plantations in Thailand during crop year 2015–2016 was about 8.8 million rai (1.41 million ha; 3.5 million acres), allowing the production of about 33 million tons of native starch. Fifty percent of tapioca in Thailand is grown in the northeast region. The five provinces with the largest tapioca plantations are Nakhon Ratchasima, which alone produces 25 percent of Thailand's total production, Kamphaeng Phet, Chaiyaphum, Sa Kaeo, and Chachoengsao. Thailand produces 28–30 million tonnes of fresh cassava roots yearly from some 500,000 households, worth more than 100 billion baht. Thailand is the world's largest exporter with about 50 percent of the market. In 2017 it exported 11 million tonnes of tapioca products. Its export goal for 2018 is 10.6 million tonnes.

According to the Thai Confederation of Tapioca Farmers, the average household makes about 53 baht (US$1.70) per rai per month from tapioca cultivation.

==== Fruits and vegetables ====
Thailand is a leading producer and exporter of tropical fruits such as durian, mangosteen, rambutan, longan, salak, and langsat (longkong).

===== Durian =====
Thailand is ranked the world's number one exporter of durians, producing around 700,000 tonnes of durian per year, 400,000 tonnes of which are exported to China and Hong Kong.

===== Tomatoes =====
In 2017, Thailand produced 122,593 tonnes of tomatoes. The northeast produces 55 percent; the north, 32 percent; and the central region, 13 percent. The highest yielding provinces are Chiang Mai, Sakon Nakhon, Nakhon Phanom, and Nong Khai. Growing tomatoes in prime areas can generate profits of up to 40,000 baht per rai. The northeast's contribution is in jeopardy due to the construction of upstream dams on the Mekong River. The dams have depleted river banks of nutrition-rich sediments and have produced unseasonal inundations as dams release water in the dry season to maintain power generation and river navigation. Samples from Chiang Mai 1994, analysed by Nishimura et al 1999, showed Phytophthora infestans of only one type, the A1 (specifically US-1) population, on tomato. Petchaboon et al 2014 analysed 53 samples from 2000 to 2002, and found them all to be A1, and of those all but one were US-1 clonal lineages, agreeing with the above results of Nishimura and also Gotoh et al 2005.

=== Non-food crops ===
==== Hemp ====
As of 2020 it is legal to produce, import, and export hemp in Thailand. The plant was removed from the government's list of narcotics in 2019. According to the Thai Food and Drug Administration (FDA) the plant can be used as a key ingredient in many food and cosmetic products.

==== Rubber ====
Thailand ranks as the world's largest rubber producer and exporter, producing around 4.3 to 5 million tonnes per year, It consumes only 519,000 tons per year. It provides about 40 percent of the world's natural rubber, mostly used in aircraft and automobile tires. But the rubber industry has faced a series of challenges. Alongside drought in 2015–2016, Thailand was hit hard by an oversupply in international rubber markets. Following a record harvest in 2011, Thailand increased rubber acreage by 45 percent. Other top producers in the region followed suit. Concomitantly, China's demand for rubber decreased by 10 percent. China is the world's largest natural rubber consumer, using 4,150,000 tons in 2013. At one point the price of the world's benchmark smoked rubber sheet dropped as low as US$1.27 per kilogram, or 80 percent below the record high of US$6.40 per kg in February 2011. Similarly, rubber futures in Shanghai have dropped by 22 percent and the export price of Thai rubber by 23 percent. Then, as prices began to rebound, the southern provinces of Thailand, where two-thirds of the Thai rubber plantations are located, were hit by torrential rains and flooding at the peak of the rubber-tapping season. The Rubber Authority of Thailand forecasts that output will drop 7.6 percent in 2017. Farmers, unable to harvest rubber sap due to high water, are unable to take advantage of the highest rubber prices in four years. Largely due to the flooding, prices for unsmoked USS3 rubber sheets in Nakhon Si Thammarat have increased steadily and reached 84.32 baht (US$2.38) per kilogram in January 2017 and will likely go higher. Rubber growers face an even greater danger: rubber trees die after 20 days when inundated by flood waters.

Farmers face an on-going disaster in 2018: rubber production costs amount to 63 baht per kilogram, but rubber can be sold for only 40 baht per kilogram. At the industry high point in 2011, farmers earned 713 billion baht from rubber sales, now down 72 percent in 2018 to 274 billion baht. The number of households farming rubber trees has declined to 1.4 million in 2018, compared with 1.6 million in 2014, yet the area devoted to rubber plantations continues to rise, to 20.6 million rai in 2018, up from 19.5 million rai in 2016 and 12.9 million rai in 2007.

Isan (northeastern Thailand), has 5.2 million rai of rubber trees. Most of them are concentrated in Bueng Kan Province on the Mekong River, with some 800,000 rai of rubber groves. The second and third largest rubber-growing areas in Isan are the provinces of Loei (700,000 rai) and Udon Thani (500,000 rai) of rubber farms. Farmers there were selling their raw product to processors for under 20 baht per kilogram as of October 2019. As recently as 2012, one kilogram sold for 80–90 baht. Many Isan farmers took up rubber cultivation as a result of the government's "Million Rai of Rubber Trees" program in 2004. The policy encouraged the expansion of rubber farms in the north and northeast and is partly to blame for an oversupply of rubber as it was implemented with few restrictions. The program caused rubber farms in Isan to expand by 17 percent per year, with little understanding of rubber's global supply and demand issues.

In 2019, south Thailand rubber growers were hit by the fungal disease Pestalotiopsis. More than 330,000 rai of rubber trees in Narathiwat, Yala, Pattani, and Trang Provinces have been damaged by Pestalotiopsis leaf fall disease since it was detected in September 2019. The disease makes the rubber tree leaves fall and production drops up to 50 percent. Rubber output has dropped by 40,000 tonnes as of November. The disease, spread by wind, has already damaged 2.3 million rai of rubber trees in Indonesia and 16,000 rai in Malaysia.

The Thai government periodically steps in to aid rubber farmers. To help the Thai rubber industry in 2016, the government spent US$471 million to aid small-scale rubber farmers cultivating up to 15 rai (six acres) of trees. This limit is seen as artificially low by Thai rubber farmers, as up to 80 percent own as much as 25 rai (4.0 ha; 9.9 acres). Consequently, in 2016 many farmers felled their rubber trees to use the land for other crops, with the government pledging an additional US$181 million to support alternative employment for rubber farmers. In 2019, Deputy Agriculture Minister Thamanat Prompow proposed spending 18 billion baht to purchase 30 million latex foam pillows to prop up rubber prices. The proposal would require buying 150,000 tonnes of latex from Thai rubber farmers who would be paid 65 baht per kilogram instead of the market price of 43–45 baht. The chief of Thai Hua Rubber PLC, in favour of the idea, suggested that the pillows could be sold at low prices or given free to foreign tourists. The pillows are to be manufactured by the Marketing Organisation for Farmers (MOF) under the supervision of the Rubber Authority of Thailand. The scheme would run until 2023.

=== Livestock ===
==== Pigs ====
Neonatal piglets in the country have been found to suffer the entire range of toxoplasmosis severity, including progression to stillbirth. This was especially demonstrated in the foundational Thiptara et al 2006, reporting a litter birth of three stillborns and six live. This observation has been relevant not only here but to toxoplasmosis control in porciculture around the world.

==== Insect ranching ====
Edible insects, whole or in chili paste and as ingredients in fortified products, are commonly consumed in Thailand. The UN Food and Agriculture Organization (FAO) estimates that there are about 20,000 cricket farms alone in 53 of Thailand's 76 provinces.

In 2018, cricket powder retails for 800-1,500 baht per kilogram, three to five times more expensive than beef. This, in spite of crickets requiring 12 times less feed, 2,000 times less water, and much less space than traditional livestock. It turns out that most Thai insect farmers are mom-and-pop outfits too small to achieve economies of scale. The market remains minuscule: The global market for beef tops US$2 trillion (66.6 trillion baht), while the market for edible insects is projected to reach only US$250 million in 2018.

==== Sericulture ====
Thailand's silkworm farmers cultivate both types of the domesticated silkworms that produce commercial silk: Samia ricini, commonly known as the "eri silkworm", and Bombyx mori, the "mulberry silkworm". The latter, used for most Thai silk, is by far the larger silk producer of the two. The Queen Sirikit Department of Sericulture estimates that in 2013, 71,630 small landholders raised mulberry silkworms on 39,570 rai, producing 287,771 kg of silk cocoons. Another 2,552 farmers grew mulberry silkworms on an industrial scale, producing 145,072 kg of silk on 15,520 rai of land. Eri silk, on the other hand, produces only a fraction of these quantities, grown by a small network of 600 families scattered throughout 28 provinces in north, northeast, and central Thailand.

In Thailand, the Center for Excellence in Silk at Kasetsart University's Kamphaeng Saen campus plays a leading research role in sericulture research as well as providing silkworm eggs and know-how to Thai farmers.

== Weather ==
=== Rainmaking ===
The Thai Royal Rainmaking Project was initiated in 1995 by King Bhumibol Adulyadej. As Thai farmers faced recurring drought, he proposed a solution to the water shortage, cloud seeding.

=== Effect of climate change ===
It is projected that temperatures will continue to rise at a steady rate in every region of Thailand within a range of 1.2–2°Celsius. Annual rainfall is projected to decrease in the central area, but increase in the northern and northeastern regions. Volume of rainfall is projected to be around 1,400 mm per annum over the next five years.

Shaobing Peng of Huazhong Agriculture University in China believes climate change is now affecting the seasonal weather in Thailand. "Global mean surface air temperature has increased by 0.5 degree Celsius in the twentieth century and will continue to increase by 1.5 to 4.5 degrees Celsius this century," he said.

Climate change will have varying effects on Thai crops. Heavy rain may damage the roots of cassava plants in the north, while a decrease in rain might damage cane sugar and rice in the central region. Temperature and quality changes of water might lead to a reduction in the viability of livestock due to heat stress, survival rates of newborn animals, and immune system impacts. Climate change has and will continue to harm rice yields. A study by Okayama University in Japan found that grain yield declines when the average daily temperature exceeds 29 °C (84 °F), and grain quality continues to decline linearly as temperatures rise. Another study found that each degree-Celsius increase in global mean temperature would, on average, reduce yields of rice by 3.2 percent and maize by 7.4 percent. Both are important Thai crops.

Already, due to the drought of 2015-2016, rice production declined 16 percent from 19.8 million tons to 16.5 million. Overall, Thailand lost 6.1 million tonnes of agricultural products worth 15.5 billion baht between January 2015 and April 2016.

To adapt to climate change, the Thai government has initiated plans to introduce drought-resistant seeds. But these seeds are not reusable and can be costly to poor farmers who are not receiving direct financial aid. Government-supplied seeds are also limited, forcing farmers to obtain their seeds from private suppliers. In 2015 60 million rai 60 million rai (9.6 million ha; 24 million acres) of rice paddies remained unplanted due to shortages of water, causing many farmers to resort to secondary crops such as sugarcane, cucumber, long beans, and tilapia aquaculture to make sufficient income.

Professor Witsanu Attavanich of Kasetsart University projects that the negative aggregate financial impact of climate change on Thailand's agriculture during the period 2040–2049 will range from US$24–94 billion. Impacts will be unevenly felt: the western region, upper part of the central region, and the left part of the northern region are projected to be better off, while the southern, eastern regions, lower part of central, and the right part of northern regions are projected to be worse off. In provincial terms, this means that Surat Thani, Chiang Mai, Chumphon, Rayong, Chachoengsao, Songkhla, Chanthaburi, Nakhon Si Thammarat, Trang, and Suphanburi Provinces are the ten provinces most adversely affected by climate change. Kamphaeng Phet, Udon Thani, Chaiyaphum, Phetchabun, Nakhon Ratchasima, Nong Bua Lamphu, Buriram, Bangkok, Khon Kaen, and Sukhothai Provinces are the ten provinces that most benefit agriculturally from climate change.

== Agricultural chemicals ==
According to the Thai government's The Eleventh National Economic and Social Development Plan (2012–2016), Thailand is number one in the world in the application of chemicals in agriculture. The report stated that, "The use of chemicals in the agricultural and industrial sectors is growing while control mechanisms are ineffective making Thailand rank first in the world in the use of registered chemicals in agriculture."

In 2018 Thai researchers and the Health Ministry called for an outright ban on the use of the agricultural chemicals paraquat, glyphosate ("Roundup"), and chlorpyrifos. Paraquat and glyphosate are widely used herbicides. Chlorpyrifos is a pesticide. All are known to hazardous to humans and the ecosystem. The ban is opposed by agricultural interests, the Agriculture Ministry and the Industry Ministry who claim that a paraquat ban alone would lead to 40 billion baht in losses for the agricultural sector. Paraquat, whose use is banned by 47 to 53 nations (sources vary), is permitted for agricultural use in Thailand. It is sold under various trade names: Crisquat, Cyclone, Dextrone, Gramoxone Extra, Herbaxone, Ortho Weed and Spot Killer, and Sweep. Thailand imported 30,441 tonnes of paraquat in 2015, 31,525 tonnes in 2016, and 44,501 tonnes in 2017. In 2011 and 2012, researchers in Nan Province found paraquat contamination in all vegetables and fish sampled. In Lampang and Lamphun Provinces in 2017, tap water in 21 communities was found to be contaminated with paraquat. Vegetable samples from the area were also contaminated. In May 2018 the National Hazardous Substance Committee (NHSC) voted 18–6 in favor of allowing the continued use of the three toxic chemicals, albeit with tighter controls. The committee said there were insufficient studies confirming they were health hazards. About 17 countries limit the use of all three chemicals.

In February 2019, three members of a panel charged with toxic chemical control resigned from the panel due to interference by farm chemical producers.

On 22 October 2019, the 26-member National Hazardous Substances Committee (NHSC) changed paraquat, glyphosate ("Roundup"), and chlorpyrifos from Type 3 toxic substances to Type 4, effectively prohibiting their production, import, export, or possession. Their use will be prohibited as of 1 December 2019. On 27 November 2019, the NHSC amended that timetable, moving the date for the ban of paraquat and chlorpyrifos to 1 June 2020. They lifted the ban on glyphosate with restrictions on usage: glyphosate will be used only on six major crops: corn, cassava, sugarcane, rubber, oil palms, and fruit. It is not permitted in watershed areas and other sensitive environment zones, and farmers must submit proof of use including the type of crops and the size of their farms when purchasing glyphosate. Industry Minister Suriya Jungrungreangkit, who chairs the NHSC, said the committee reached its decision after reviewing information provided by the Department of Agriculture and the Ministry of Public Health. NCHS member Jirapon Limpananon, chair of the Pharmacy Council of Thailand, announced her resignation from the NCHS Wednesday night following the meeting.

The next day, 28 November, public health authorities insisted that the NHSC neither lifted nor eased a ban on the three toxic farm chemicals, as Industry Minister Suriya Juangroongruangkit had claimed. Physicians who attended the NHSC's 27 November meeting said that "...no one at Wednesday's meeting ... raised a hand to revoke the Oct 22 resolution."

On 1 June 2020, the ban on chlorpyrifos and paraquat took effect. They are now illegal chemicals. Farmers have 90 days to return their supplies on hand to manufacturers, who must destroy them within 270 days of the ban. The agriculture ministry estimates that 21,000 tonnes of the chemicals are stockpiled in Thailand. Glyphosate remains in use, evidently due to US pressure.

== Organic farming ==
Farmland certified as organic in Thailand amounts to 0.3–0.5 percent of all agricultural land compared with one percent worldwide. From 2010 to 2014, Thai sales of organic food grew at a seven percent annual rate, compared with five percent for conventional foods. Nevertheless, Thailand's consumption of organic food remains low, with retail sales of just US$0.24 per capita in 2014, compared with US$10 in Japan and US$294 in Switzerland, the world leader. Thailand's leading organic crops are coffee beans, mulberry leaf tea, fresh vegetables and fruit, grown by less than 0.2 percent of Thailand's farmers. Fifty-eight percent of the organic food sold at retail in Thailand is imported.

Due to a program started over forty years ago by a local monk, Surin Province produces about 4,200 tons of organic jasmine rice per year. A local cooperative, the Rice Fund Surin Organic Agriculture Cooperative Ltd, exports its rice to France, Hong Kong, Singapore, Switzerland, and the United States. Surin organic rice farmers receive fifteen baht (US$0.43) per kilogram of paddy, compared with the market price of nine baht/kilo for non-organic jasmine. As the organic rice farmers do not pay for chemical inputs, each can earn about 80,000 baht (US$2,285) per crop, on an average-sized farm of fifteen rai (2.4 ha; 5.9 acres).

King Bhumibol was a staunch believer in organic farming. Despite that, successive governments have all promoted chemical-based agriculture. In the 1960s, Thailand joined the so-called "green revolution". Farmers were encouraged to grow new strains of crops that were optimised for chemical inputs. Thailand today is one of the world's top users of farm chemicals. The country imports about 160,000 tonnes of farm chemicals per year at a cost of 22 billion baht. Since 2011, agricultural chemical imports have risen by 50 percent. In 2014, agricultural chemical imports rose over 70 percent to 22 billion baht compared to 2013.

In July 2012 consumer action groups demanded that four unlisted toxic pesticides (banned in developed countries) found on common vegetables at levels 100 times EU guidelines be banned. Chemical companies demanded they be added to the Thai Dangerous Substances Act so they can continue to be used, including on exported mangoes to developed countries which have banned their use. In 2014, Khon Kaen University concluded that Thailand should ban 155 types of pesticides, with 14 listed as urgent: Carbofuran, Methyl Bromide, Dichlorvos, Lambda-cyhalothrin, Methidathion-methyl, Omethoate, Zeta Cypermethrin, Endosulfan sulfate, Aldicarb, Azinphos-methyl, Chlorpyrifos-ethyl, Methoxychlor, and Paraquat. Instead, by 2014 the number of active ingredients in imported pesticides increased from 210 to 253. Herbicides were by far the most significant of the imported chemicals, accounting for 80 percent of the total volume, followed by insecticides at nine percent and fungicides at eight percent.

== Governmental price supports ==
In November 2016, Prime Minister Prayut Chan-o-cha pledged to improve the well-being of farmers over the following five years. He did so in the face of declining rice prices, the lowest in ten years. He said the improvements would result from "smart farmer projects" initiated by the government, part of its 20-year national strategy. Following up on Prayut's remarks, Agriculture and Cooperatives Minister General Chatchai said that the government's strategy would increase farmer income to 390,000 baht per person per year within 20 years. This, he said, would be achieved by increasing the number of large farms to 5,000 nationwide and by switching 500,000 rai from rice cultivation to other crops. The government allocated eight billion baht for the provision of soft loans to farmers in 35 provinces to switch to growing maize on two million rai.

In 2016 rice subsidies were approved for hom mali, white paddy, Pathum Thani fragrant paddy, and glutinous rice. The government will pay up to 13,000 baht per tonne to growers who store their rice until overall rice prices gradually recover.

== See also ==
- Coffee production in Thailand
- Coconut production in Thailand
- Ministry of Agriculture and Cooperatives (Thailand)
- 1970s peasant revolts in Thailand
- Rice production in Thailand
- Tapioca industry of Thailand
