= Dairy Farming Promotion Organization of Thailand =

- องค์การส่งเสริมกิจการโคนมแห่งประเทศไทย; Ongkan Songsoem Kitchakan Khonom Haeng Prathet Thai

State enterprise overview
- Formed: 16 January 1962; 64 years ago
- Preceding State enterprise: Thai-Danish Dairy Farm (TDDF)
- Headquarters: Mittraphap Sub-district, Muak Lek, Saraburi
- State enterprise executive: Somporn Srimuang, Director-General
- Parent department: Ministry of Agriculture and Cooperatives
- Website: Official website

The Dairy Farming Promotion Organization of Thailand (DPO) is a Thai state enterprise under the oversight of the Ministry of Agriculture and Cooperatives. It is best known as the manufacturer of the Thai-Denmark (previously known as Thai-Danish) brand of dairy products.

== History ==
On a state visit to Denmark in 1960, King Bhumibol Adulyadej showed interest in Danish dairy farming and asked the Danish Agricultural Organization for assistance. The Thai-Danish Dairy Farm (TDDF) was conceived as a result. On 16 January 1962 the TDDF dairy farm (Dansk-Thailandsk Kvæglandbrug) was opened by King Frederik IX of Denmark and King Bhumibol Adulyadej of Thailand. On 19 October 1971 the TDDF was transferred to the Thai government and was granted the status of a state enterprise under the Agriculture Ministry. It was then renamed the "Dairy Farming Promotion Organization of Thailand (DPO)".

== Products ==
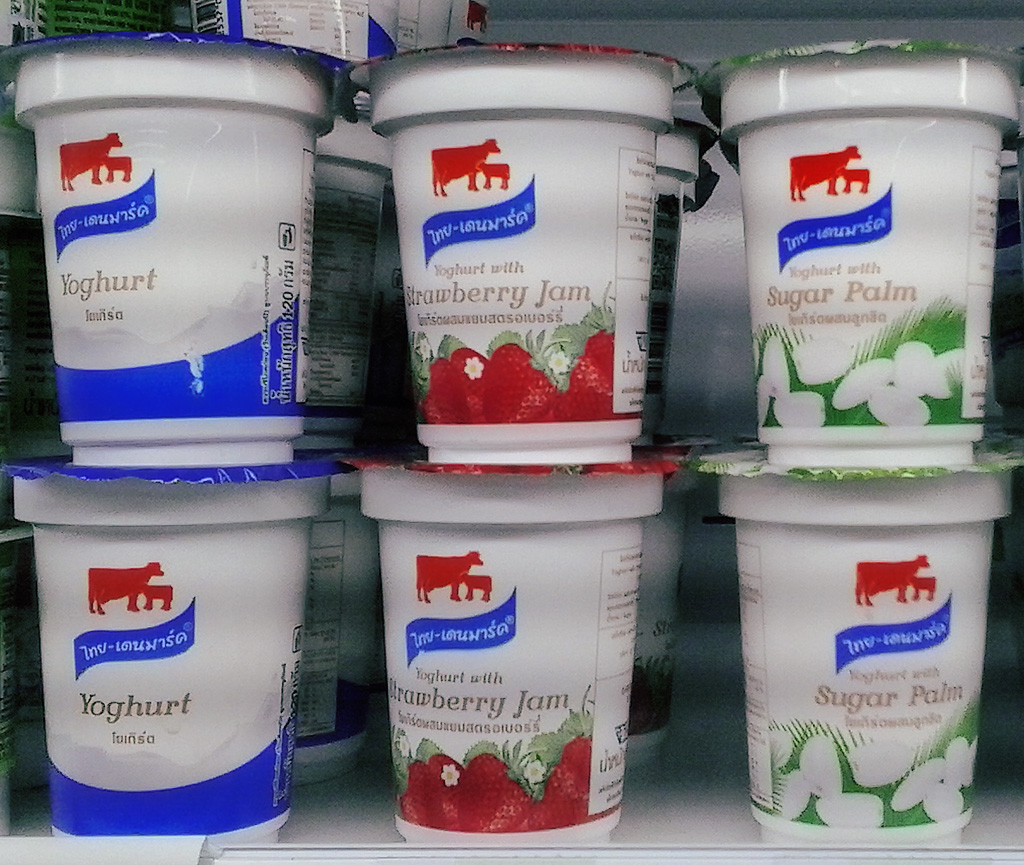
Thai-Denmark yoghurt products.

As of 2018, 95 percent of DPO's revenues come from UHT milk products. The company's forward strategy includes more focus on refrigerated dairy products: pasteurised milk, ice cream, and yogurt. DPO processes about 700 tonnes of raw milk per day from 44 dairy cooperatives across Thailand, out of a country-wide output of about 3,300 tonnes per day. The milk is processed at DPO dairy plants in Chiang Mai, Khon Kaen, Prachuap Khiri Khan, Saraburi, and Sukhothai.

== Domestic market ==
The per capita consumption of dairy products in Thailand is 17 to 18 litres per year, as compared with 48.7 litres (milk only) in India and 31 litres (milk only) in Japan (2017). DPO aims to increase Thailand's per capita consumption to 25 litres per year.

== Financials ==
DPO forecasts FY2019 revenues of 10.5 billion baht, up from 9.56 billion baht in the FY2018 fiscal year ending 30 September 2018. DPO's net profit in FY2018 was 310 million baht. Overseas sales were 1.1 billion baht in FY2018, expected to grow to 1.3 billion baht in FY2019. DPO targets Cambodia, China, Malaysia, and Myanmar for expansion.
