= Ministry of Agriculture and Cooperatives (Thailand) =

Government ministry of Thailand

- กระทรวงเกษตรและสหกรณ์
- The Seal of Varuna on Naga's Back

- The Flag of Varuna on Naga's Back

Ministry overview
- Formed: 1 April 1892; 134 years ago
- Jurisdiction: Government of Thailand
- Headquarters: Ratchadamnoen Nok Road, Phra Nakhon, Bangkok
- Annual budget: 108,997 million baht (FY2019)
- Minister responsible: Suriya Jungrungreangkit, Minister
- Deputy Ministers responsible: Watcharaphol Khaokham, Deputy Minister; Piyarat Tiyapairat, Deputy Minister
- Ministry executive: Prayoon Inskul, Permanent Secretary
- Website: www.moac.go.th

The Ministry of Agriculture and Cooperatives (Abrv: MOAC; Thai: กระทรวงเกษตรและสหกรณ์, RTGS: Krasuang Kaset Lae Sahakon) is a cabinet ministry in the government of Thailand. The ministry is one of the oldest ministries in the government, tracing its existence to the 14th century. The ministry is responsible for the administration of agricultural policies, forestry, water resources, irrigation, promotion and development of farmers and cooperative systems, including agricultural manufacturing and products. As Thailand is an agricultural country with a strong agrarian tradition, the ministry is one of the most important departments in the government. The ministry is headed by a Minister of Agriculture and Cooperatives.

== History ==
During the Kingdom of Ayutthaya one of the king's four ministries was the "Kromma Na" (Thai: กรมนา) or Farm Ministry. Created in 1350, the ministry was responsible for the prevention and resolution of conflicts over rice, other crops, and livestock. Eventually the ministry gained more powers from the king to manage land reformation, irrigation and livestock, collecting broken rice grains for the royal granary, management of the king's land holdings, solving conflicts over land ownership, and appointment of officers to provincial towns.

During the Rattanakosin Kingdom and later periods, the name of the ministry changed several times. In 1892 its name changed to the "Ministry of Kasetpanichakarn"; in 1898 to the "Ministry of Kasettrathikarn"; in 1932 to the "Ministry of Kasetpanichayakarn"; in 1933 to the "Ministry of Setthakarn"; in 1935 to the "Ministry of Kasettrathikarn"; in 1952 to the "Ministry of Agriculture"; and finally to its current name, the "Ministry of Agriculture and Cooperatives" in 1972.

== Budget ==
The ministry's FY2019 budget is 108,997 baht, down from 122,573 million baht in FY2018. The ministry's Royal Irrigation Department (RID) accounts for more than 50% of the ministry's budget.

== Departments ==
=== Administration ===
- Office of the Minister
- Office of the Permanent Secretary for Agriculture and Cooperatives
  - Kasetradhikarn Institute
  - Department of Royal Rainmaking and Agricultural Aviation

=== Dependent departments ===
- Department of Agriculture Extension
- Agricultural Land Reform Office
- Department of Agriculture
  - Rubber Research Institute
- National Bureau of Agriculture Commodity and Food Standards
- Office of Agriculture Economics
- Cooperative Auditing Department
- Cooperative Promotion Department
- Department of Fisheries
- Land Development Department
- Department of Livestock Development
- The Royal Irrigation Department
- Rice Department
- The Queen Sirikit Department of Sericulture

=== State enterprises ===
- Dairy Farming Promotion Organization of Thailand
- Fish Marketing Organization
- The Marketing Organization for Farmers
- Rubber Authority of Thailand
- Office of Rubber Replanting Aid Fund

=== Public organizations ===
- Agriculture Research Development Agency (Public Organization)
- Highland Research and Development Institute (Public Organization)
- The Golden Jubilee Agriculture Museum (Public Organization)

== Criticism ==
The ministry has drawn criticism from observers who charge, among other things, that, "The Agriculture Ministry has...become the mouthpiece for agro giants—and agricultural officials their salesmen." The criticism arises from Thailand's profligate use of farm chemicals. According to the World Bank, Thailand is the world's fifth largest user of farm chemicals, although its arable land ranks only 48th in the world. About 70 pesticides used in Thailand are banned in the West.

According to the Thai government's The Eleventh National Economic and Social Development Plan (2012-1016), Thailand is number one in the world in the application of chemicals in agriculture. The report stated, "The use of chemicals in the agricultural and industrial sectors is growing while control mechanisms are ineffective making Thailand rank first in the world in the use of registered chemicals in agriculture."

A wave of criticism surfaced following the appointment in July 2019 of Captain Thamanat Prompow as deputy minister of MOAC. Despite Thamanat's having served four years in an Australian prison for smuggling heroin, Thailand's deputy prime minister, Wissanu Krea-ngam, said that Thamanat was eligible to serve as a government minister as he was not prosecuted by the Thai judiciary. The Thai constitution states that a person who commits a narcotics offense is prohibited from being elected as an MP, but as Wissanu explained, "In the past, there was an MP who had been prosecuted in Hong Kong for drug trafficking, but his status was not affected in Thailand,...Although his reputation among many things might have been impacted, his deeds and ethical standards have to be considered separately." Thamanat himself moved to quickly dismiss reports of his drug-related conviction during his Australia stay from April 1993 to April 1997. His account of those years in no way resembles that put forward by Australian news reports. Thamanat says he will sue the Sydney Morning Herald for their reporting.

== See also ==
- Agriculture in Thailand
- Bank for Agriculture and Agricultural Co-operatives
- Cabinet of Thailand
- Economy of Thailand
- Government of Thailand
- List of Government Ministers of Thailand
- Office of the National Water Resources
