= Methyl isocyanate =

- Methyl isocyanate

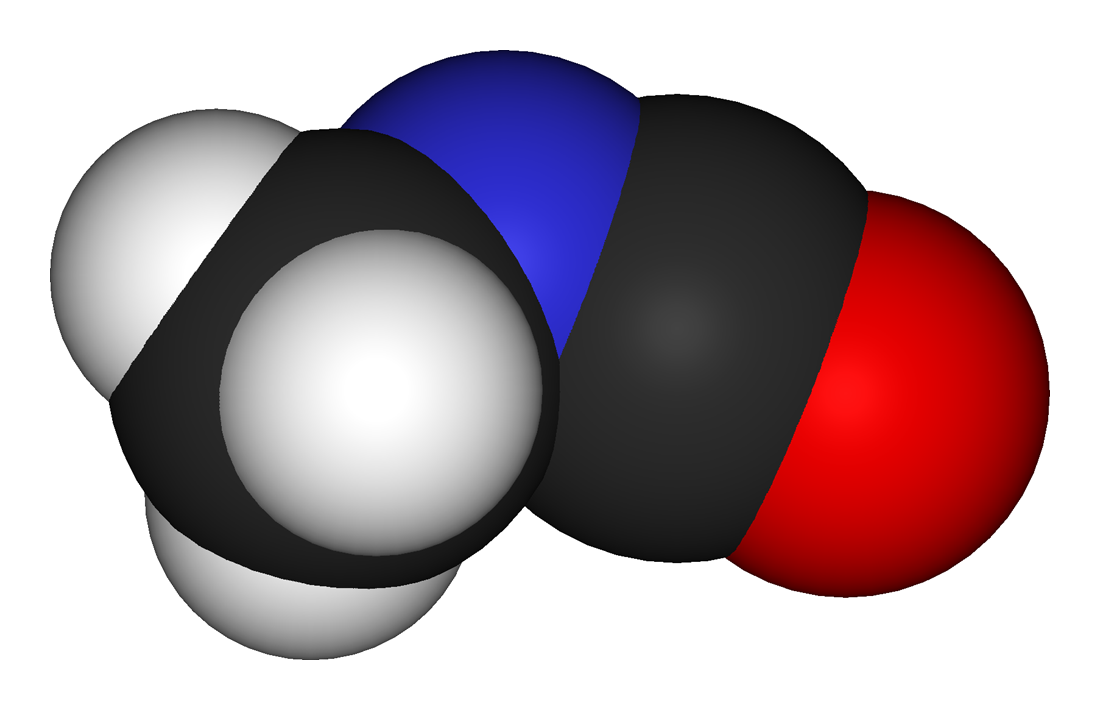
- Methyl isocyanate

Names
- Preferred IUPAC name Isocyanatomethane
- Other names Methyl carbylamine MIC

Identifiers
CAS Number	624-83-9
3D model (JSmol)	Interactive image
ChEBI	CHEBI:59059
ChemSpider	11727
ECHA InfoCard	100.009.879
IUPHAR/BPS	6290
PubChem CID	12228
UNII	C588JJ4BV9
CompTox Dashboard (EPA)	DTXSID1023786
- InChI: InChI=1S/C2H3NO/c1-3-2-4/h1H3 Key: HAMGRBXTJNITHG-UHFFFAOYSA-N
- SMILES: O=C=NC

Properties
Chemical formula	C_{2}H_{3}NO
Molar mass	57.051 g/mol
Appearance	Colorless liquid
Odor	Sharp, pungent odor
Density	0.9230 g/cm^{3} at 27 °C
Melting point	−45 °C (−49 °F; 228 K)
Boiling point	38.3–41 °C (100.9–105.8 °F; 311.4–314.1 K)
Solubility in water	10% (15°C)
Vapor pressure	57.7 kPa

Structure
Dipole moment	2.8 D

Thermochemistry
Std enthalpy of formation (Δ_{f}H^{⦵}_{298})	−92.0 kJ·mol^{−1}
Std enthalpy of combustion (Δ_{c}H^{⦵}_{298})	-1127.5 kJ/mol

Hazards
- GHS labelling
Pictograms	(GHS06: Toxic) (GHS08: Health hazard) (GHS02: Flammable) (GHS05: Corrosive) (GHS07: Exclamation mark)
Hazard statements	H225, H300, H311, H315, H317, H318, H330, H334, H335, H361d
Precautionary statements	P201, P202, P210, P233, P240, P241, P242, P243, P260, P264, P270, P271, P272, P280, P281, P284, P285, P301+P310, P302+P352, P303+P361+P353, P304+P340, P304+P341, P305+P351+P338, P308+P313, P310, P312, P320, P321, P330, P332+P313, P333+P313, P342+P311, P361, P362, P363, P370+P378, P403+P233, P403+P235, P405, P501
NFPA 704 (fire diamond)	4 3 3 W
Flash point	−7 °C (19 °F; 266 K)
Autoignition temperature	534 °C (993 °F; 807 K)
Explosive limits	5.3–26%
- Lethal dose or concentration (LD, LC)
LD_{50} (median dose)	120 mg/kg (oral, mouse); 51.5 mg/kg (oral, rat)
LC_{50} (median concentration)	6.1 ppm (rat, 6 hr); 12.2 ppm (mouse, 6 hr); 5.4 ppm (guinea pig, 6 hr); 21 ppm (rat, 2 hr)
- NIOSH (US health exposure limits)
PEL (Permissible)	TWA 0.02 ppm (0.05 mg/m^{3}) [skin]
REL (Recommended)	TWA 0.02 ppm (0.05 mg/m^{3}) [skin]
IDLH (Immediate danger)	3 ppm

Related compounds
Related compounds	Methyl isothiocyanate; Ethyl isocyanate; Propyl isocyanate; Butyl isocyanate; Pentyl isocyanate; Hexyl isocyanate; Heptyl isocyanate
- Except where otherwise noted, data are given for materials in their standard state (at 25 °C [77 °F], 100 kPa). verify (what is ?) Infobox references

Methyl isocyanate (MIC) is an organic compound with the molecular formula CH_{3}NCO. Synonyms are isocyanatomethane and methyl carbylamine. Methyl isocyanate is a chemical intermediate in the Hofmann rearrangement of acetamide and the production of carbamate pesticides (such as carbaryl, carbofuran, methomyl, and aldicarb). It has also been used in the production of rubbers and adhesives. As an extremely toxic and irritating compound, it is very hazardous to human health. MIC was the principal toxicant involved in the Bhopal gas disaster, which short-term killed 4,000–8,000 people and caused permanent injury and premature deaths to approximately 15,000–20,000. It is also a very potent lachrymatory agent.

== Physical properties ==
Methyl isocyanate is a colorless, poisonous, lachrymatory (tearing agent), flammable liquid. It is soluble in water to 6–10 parts per 100 parts, but it also reacts with water (see Reactions below).

It has a refractive index of 1.363 with a wavelength of 589 nm at a temperature of 20 °C.

== Production ==
Methyl isocyanate is usually produced by the reaction of methylamine and phosgene. For large-scale production it is advantageous to combine these reactants at higher temperature in the gas phase. A mixture of methyl isocyanate and two moles of hydrogen chloride is formed, but N-methylcarbamoyl chloride (MCC) forms as the mixture is condensed, leaving one mole of hydrogen chloride as a gas.

The methyl isocyanate is obtained by treating the MCC with a tertiary amine, such as N,N-dimethylaniline, or with pyridine, or by separating it by using distillation techniques.

Methyl isocyanate is also manufactured from N-methylformamide and air. In the latter process, it is immediately consumed in a closed-loop process to make methomyl. Other manufacturing methods have been reported.

== Reactions ==
Methyl isocyanate reacts readily with many substances that contain N-H or O-H groups. With water, it forms 1,3-dimethylurea and carbon dioxide with the evolution of heat (1358.5 joules, or 325 calories, per gram of MIC): It is relatively slow to react at below 20 °C (68 °F), but will increase its rate with elevated temperatures or in the presence of acid or base.

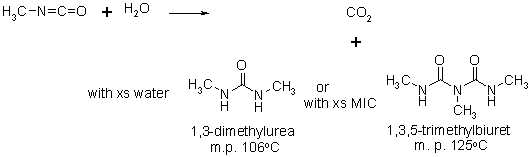

At 25 °C (77 °F), in excess water, half of the MIC is consumed in 9 min.; if the heat is not efficiently removed from the reacting mixture, the rate of the reaction will increase and rapidly cause the MIC to boil. Such a reaction triggered the Bhopal disaster after a large amount of water was introduced to a MIC storage tank. The consequence of the out of control exothermic process was a runaway reaction and the direct release of 42 tons of MIC to the atmosphere.

If MIC is in excess, 1,3,5-trimethylbiuret is formed along with carbon dioxide. Alcohols and phenols, which contain an O-H group, react slowly with MIC, but the reaction can be catalyzed by trialkylamines or dialkyltin dicarboxylate. Oximes, hydroxylamines, and enols also react with MIC to form methylcarbamates. These reactions produce the products described below (Uses).

Ammonia, primary, and secondary amines rapidly react with MIC to form substituted ureas. Other N-H compounds, such as amides and ureas, react much more slowly with MIC.

It also reacts with itself to form a trimer or higher-molecular-weight polymers. In the presence of catalysts, MIC reacts with itself to form a solid trimer, trimethyl isocyanurate, or a higher-molecular-weight polymer:

Sodium methoxide, triethyl phosphine, ferric chloride and certain other metal compounds catalyze the formation of the MIC-trimer, while the high-molecular-weight polymer formation is catalyzed by certain trialkylamines. Since the formation of the MIC trimer is exothermic (1246 joules, or 298 calories, per gram of MIC), the reaction can lead to violent boiling of the MIC. The high-molecular-weight polymer hydrolyzes in hot water to form the trimethyl isocyanurate. Since catalytic metal salts can be formed from impurities in commercial grade MIC and steel, this product must not be stored in steel drums or tanks.

== Toxicity ==
Methyl isocyanate is extremely toxic. There is no known antidote. The threshold limit value set by the American Conference of Governmental Industrial Hygienists is 0.02 ppm. MIC is toxic by inhalation, ingestion and contact in quantities as low as 0.4 ppm. Exposure symptoms include coughing, chest pain, dyspnea, asthma, irritation of the eyes, nose and throat, as well as skin damage. Higher levels of exposure, over 21 ppm, can result in pulmonary or lung edema, emphysema and hemorrhages, bronchial pneumonia and death. Although the odor of methyl isocyanate cannot be detected at 5 ppm by most people, its potent lachrymal properties provide an excellent warning of its presence (at a concentration of 2–4 parts per million (ppm) subjected to eyes are irritated, while at 21 ppm, subjects could not tolerate the presence of methyl isocyanate in air). The irritant effects of methyl isocyanate are mediated by the irritant and tear gas receptor TRPA1 in pain-sensing nerve endings in the eye.

Proper care must be taken to store methyl isocyanate because of its ease of exothermically polymerizing (see Reactions) and its similar sensitivity to water. Only stainless steel or glass containers may be safely used; the MIC must be stored at temperatures below 40 °C (104 °F) and preferably at 4 °C (39 °F).

The toxic effect of the compound was apparent in the 1984 Bhopal disaster, when around 42,000 kilograms (93,000 lb) of methyl isocyanate and other gases were released from the underground reservoirs of the Union Carbide India Limited (UCIL) factory, over a populated area on 3 December 1984, killing about 3,500 people immediately, 8,000 people in the first 48 hours and 15,000 more over the next several years. 200,000 people had lasting health effects from the disaster.

During structural fires, natural materials can contribute to releasing isocyanates including methyl isocyanate.

=== Mechanism of action ===
Until recent decades, the mechanism of methyl isocyanate toxicity in humans was largely unknown or unclear. Methyl isocyanate and other isocyanates are electrophiles and are currently thought to cause toxicity by the alkylation of biomolecules. The mechanism of methyl isocyanate was previously suspected to be the carbamylation of hemoglobin, thus interfering with its oxygen-binding capability and causing hypoxia. However, experiments showed that when rats and guinea pigs were exposed to methyl isocyanate at concentrations above the median lethal concentration (LC_{50}, the concentration sufficient to kill 50% of the tested population), only 2% of hemoglobin molecules were carbamylated, suggesting that this is probably not the mechanism of toxicity.

== Extraterrestrial occurrence ==
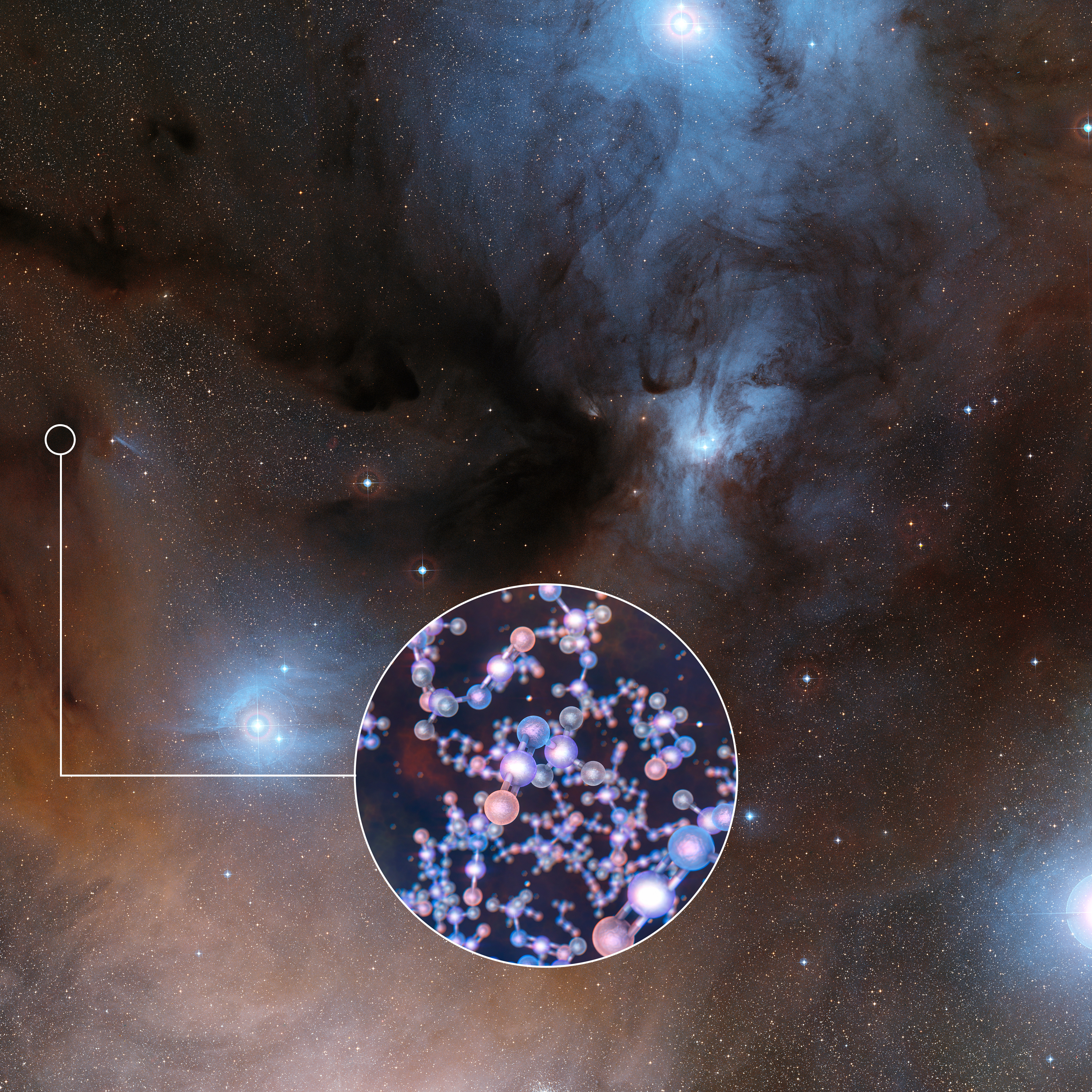
A photographic montage of methyl isocyanate around young Sun-like stars, as detected by the ALMA interferometer (northern Chile).

On 30 July 2015, scientists reported that upon the first touchdown of the Philae lander on comet 67/P's surface, measurements by the COSAC and Ptolemy instruments revealed sixteen organic compounds, four of which were seen for the first time on a comet, including acetamide, acetone, methyl isocyanate and propionaldehyde.

In 2017, two teams of astronomers using the Atacama Large Millimeter Array (ALMA) interferometer made of 66 radio telescopes in the Atacama Desert (northern Chile) have discovered the presence of MIC around young Sun-like stars.

MIC is considered a prebiotic molecule as explained by the discoverers of the ALMA findings in IRAS 16293-2422, a multiple system of very young stars: "This family of organic molecules is involved in the synthesis of peptides and amino acids, which, in the form of proteins, are the biological basis for life as we know it".
