= R-16661 =

Names
- IUPAC name 2-(Methoxy(methylthio)phosphinylimino)-3-ethyl-5-methyl-1,3-oxazolidine
- Other names Stauffer R-16661

Identifiers
CAS Number	22791-12-4
3D model (JSmol)	Interactive image
ChemSpider	4948264
PubChem CID	6507077
- InChI: InChI=1S/C8H17N2O3PS/c1-5-10-6-7(2)13-8(10)9-14(11,12-3)15-4/h7H,5-6H2,1-4H3/b9-8+ Key: JCYANUVOCLKHHY-CMDGGOBGSA-N
- SMILES: CCN1CC(OC1=NP(=O)(OC)SC)C

Properties
Chemical formula	C_{8}H_{17}N_{2}O_{3}PS
Molar mass	252.27 g·mol^{−1}

Hazards
- Occupational safety and health (OHS/OSH)
Main hazards	Extremely toxic
- Lethal dose or concentration (LD, LC)
LD_{50} (median dose)	0.1 mg/kg (mice, oral); 0.1 mg/kg (rats, oral)
- Except where otherwise noted, data are given for materials in their standard state (at 25 °C [77 °F], 100 kPa). Infobox references

R-16661 is an extremely toxic organophosphate insecticide. With an oral LD_{50} of 0.1 mg/kg in mice and rats, R-16661 is about 10 times more toxic than aldicarb, the most toxic carbamate insecticide.

== See also ==
- Aldicarb
- Paraoxon
