= Hexyl isocyanate =

- Hexyl isocyanate

Names
- IUPAC name 1-isocyanatohexane
- Other names: hexyl monoisocyanate; hexylmonoisocyanate

Identifiers
CAS Number	2525-62-4
3D model (JSmol)	Interactive image
ChEBI	CHEBI:59058
ChemSpider	68179
ECHA InfoCard	100.017.967
EC Number	219-763-8
Gmelin Reference	200966
PubChem CID	75659
UNII	K9T9YK3VJU
CompTox Dashboard (EPA)	DTXSID8062492
- InChI: InChI=1S/C7H13NO/c1-2-3-4-5-6-8-7-9/h2-6H2,1H3 Key: ANJPRQPHZGHVQB-UHFFFAOYSA-N
- SMILES: CCCCCCN=C=O

Properties
Chemical formula	C_{7}H_{13}NO
Molar mass	127.187 g·mol^{−1}
Appearance	clear liquid
Density	0.873 g/mL at 25 °C
Boiling point	162–164 °C (324–327 °F; 435–437 K)
Solubility in water	decomposes in water

Hazards
- GHS labelling
Pictograms	(GHS02: Flammable) (GHS07: Exclamation mark) (GHS08: Health hazard)
Signal word	Danger
Hazard statements	H226, H302, H312, H317, H334
Precautionary statements	P210, P233, P240, P280, P301, P303, P312, P353, P361
Flash point	59 °C (138 °F; 332 K)

Related compounds
Related compounds	Methyl isocyanate; Ethyl isocyanate; Propyl isocyanate; Butyl isocyanate; Pentyl isocyanate; Heptyl isocyanate
- Except where otherwise noted, data are given for materials in their standard state (at 25 °C [77 °F], 100 kPa). Infobox references

Hexyl isocyanate is an organic chemical compound of carbon, hydrogen, nitrogen, and oxygen with the linear formula CH_{3}(CH_{2})_{5}NCO. The compound belongs to the family of isocyanates, characterized by the reactive functional group –N=C=O.

== Structure ==
Hexyl isocyanate consists of a six-carbon hexyl chain CH_{3}(CH_{2})_{5}– attached to an isocyanate group –N=C=O.

== Synthesis ==
Hexyl isocyanate can be synthesized through several methods. The traditional industrial synthesis involves the reaction of hexylamine with phosgene. This proceeds via the formation of a carbamoyl chloride intermediate, which subsequently decomposes to yield hexyl isocyanate and hydrogen chloride.

== Physical properties ==
The compound is a colorless to pale yellow flammable liquid with a pungent odor. Decomposes in water.

== Uses ==
The compound serves primarily as an intermediate in the synthesis of various chemicals, including polyurethanes and other polymers.

Hexyl isocyanate has also been investigated for its antigenicity in guinea pig animal models of hapten-specific respiratory hypersensitivity. It has been shown to induce respiratory sensitization and inflammation in the respiratory tract.
