= C7H14N2O2S =

The molecular formula C_{7}H_{14}N_{2}O_{2}S may refer to:

- Aldicarb, a carbamate insecticide which is the active substance in the pesticide Temik
- Butocarboxim, a carbamate insecticide and structural isomer of aldicarb
