= Carbamic acid =

Molecule with an amine directly attached to formic acid

Structural formula of carbamic acid
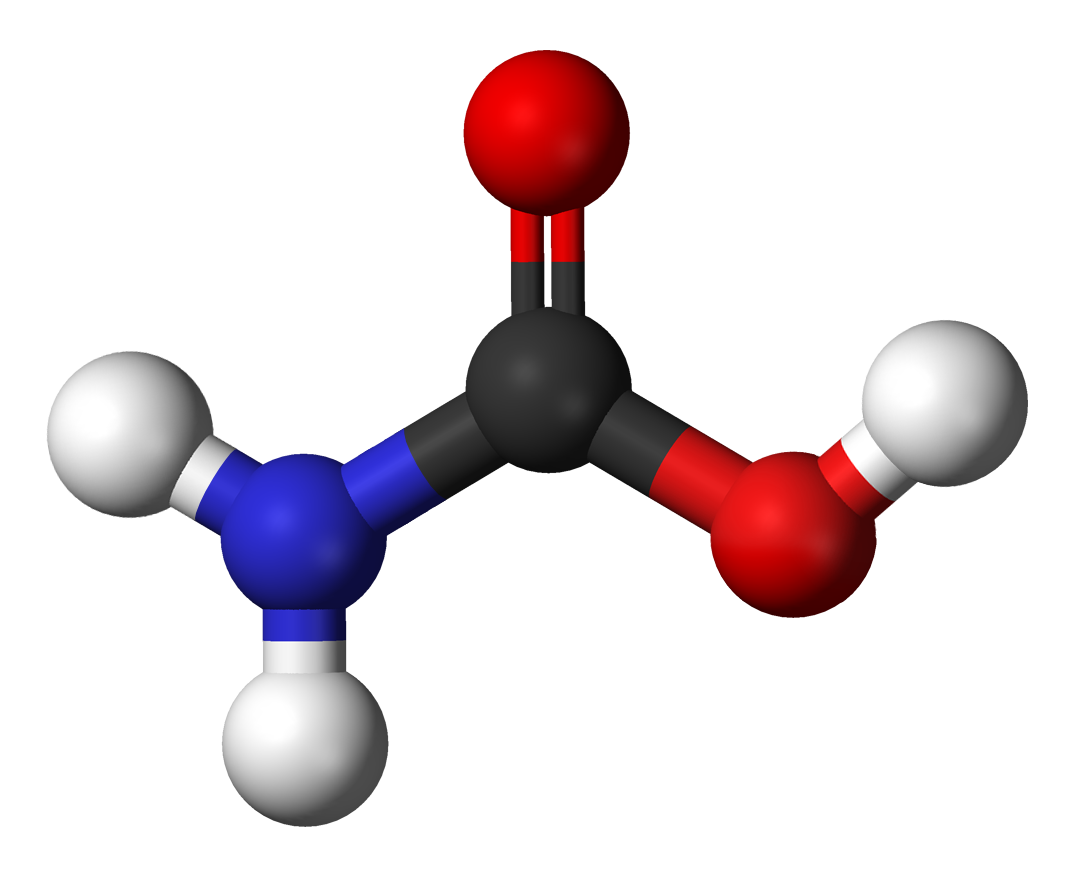
Ball-and-stick model of carbamic acid

Names
- Preferred IUPAC name Carbamic acid
- Other names Aminomethanoic acid

Identifiers
CAS Number	463-77-4
3D model (JSmol)	Interactive image
ChEBI	CHEBI:28616
ChEMBL	ChEMBL125278
ChemSpider	271
DrugBank	DB04261
KEGG	C01563
MeSH	Carbamic+acid
PubChem CID	277
UNII	O0UC6XOS4H
CompTox Dashboard (EPA)	DTXSID5048009
- InChI: InChI=1S/CH3NO2/c2-1(3)4/h2H2,(H,3,4) Key: KXDHJXZQYSOELW-UHFFFAOYSA-N; InChI=1/CH3NO2/c2-1(3)4/h2H2,(H,3,4) Key: KXDHJXZQYSOELW-UHFFFAOYAC
- SMILES: O=C(O)N

Properties
Chemical formula	CH_{3}NO_{2}
Molar mass	61.040 g·mol^{−1}

Related compounds
Related compounds	Formamide; Dithiocarbamate; Carbonic acid Urea; Ethyl carbamate Sulfamic acid
- Except where otherwise noted, data are given for materials in their standard state (at 25 °C [77 °F], 100 kPa). verify (what is ?) Infobox references

Carbamic acid, which might also be called aminoformic acid or aminocarboxylic acid, is the chemical compound with the formula H_{2}NCOOH. It can be obtained by the reaction of ammonia NH_{3} and carbon dioxide CO_{2} at very low temperatures, which also yields ammonium carbamate [NH_{4}]^{+}[NH_{2}CO_{2}]^{−}. The compound is stable only up to about 250 K (−23 °C); at higher temperatures it decomposes into those two gases. The solid apparently consists of dimers, with the two molecules connected by hydrogen bonds between the two carboxyl groups –COOH.

Carbamic acid could be seen as both an amine and carboxylic acid, and therefore an amino acid; however, the attachment of the carboxyl group –COOH directly to the nitrogen atom (without any intermediate carbon chain) makes it behave very differently from the amino acids with intermediate carbon chain. (Glycine NH_{2}CH_{2}COOH is generally considered to be the simplest amino acid.) The hydroxyl group –OH attached to the carbon also excludes it from the amide class.

The term "carbamic acid" is also used generically for any compounds of the form RR′NCOOH, where R and R′ are organic groups or hydrogen.

Deprotonation of a carbamic acid yields a carbamate anion RR′NCOO^{−}, the salts of which can be relatively stable. Carbamate is also a term used for esters of carbamic acids, such as methyl carbamate H_{2}N−C(=O)−OCH_{3}. The carbamoyl functional group RR′N–C(=O)– (often denoted by Cbm) is the carbamic acid molecule minus the OH part of the carboxyl.

== Structure ==
Carbamic acid is a planar molecule.

The H_{2}N− group of carbamic acid, unlike that of most amines, cannot be protonated to an ammonium group H_{3}N^{+}−. The zwitterionic form H_{3}N^{+}−COO^{−} is very unstable and promptly decomposes into ammonia and carbon dioxide, yet there is a report of its detection in ices irradiated with high-energy protons.

== Derivatives ==
Carbamic acid is formally the parent compound of several important families of organic compounds:

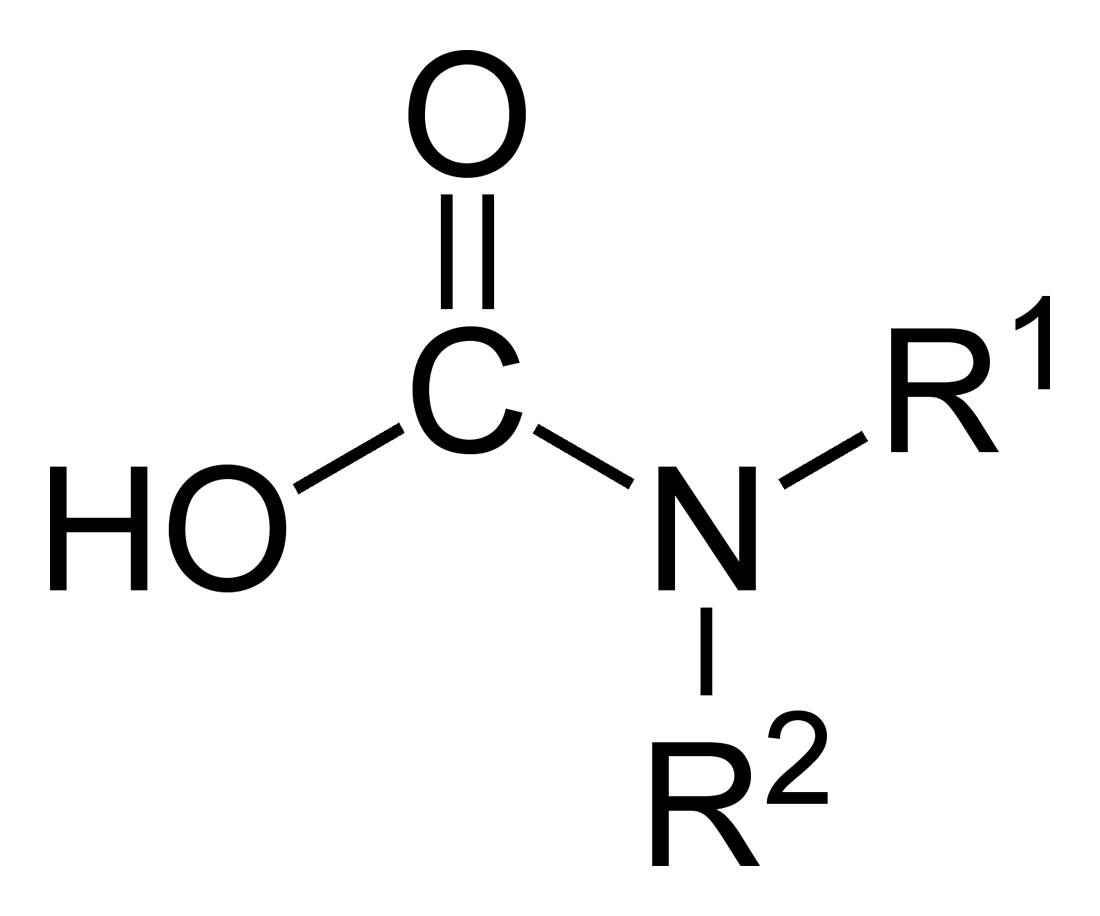
carbamic acids

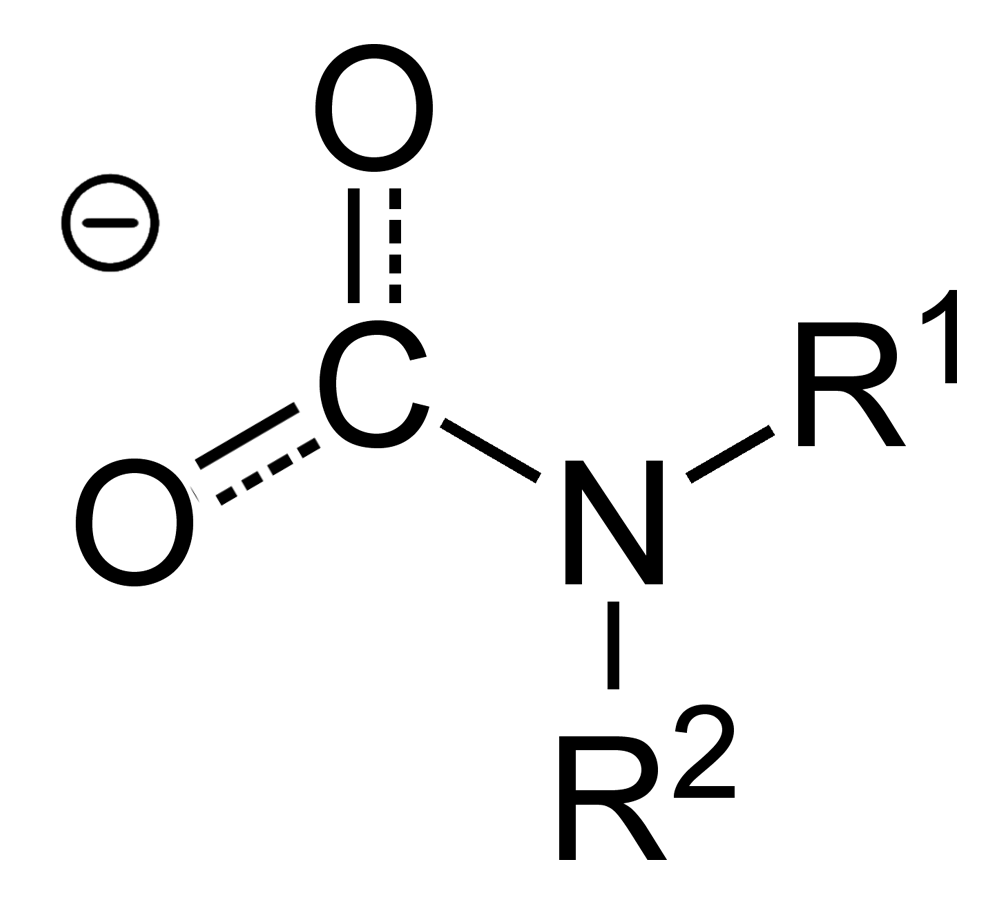
carbamate anions

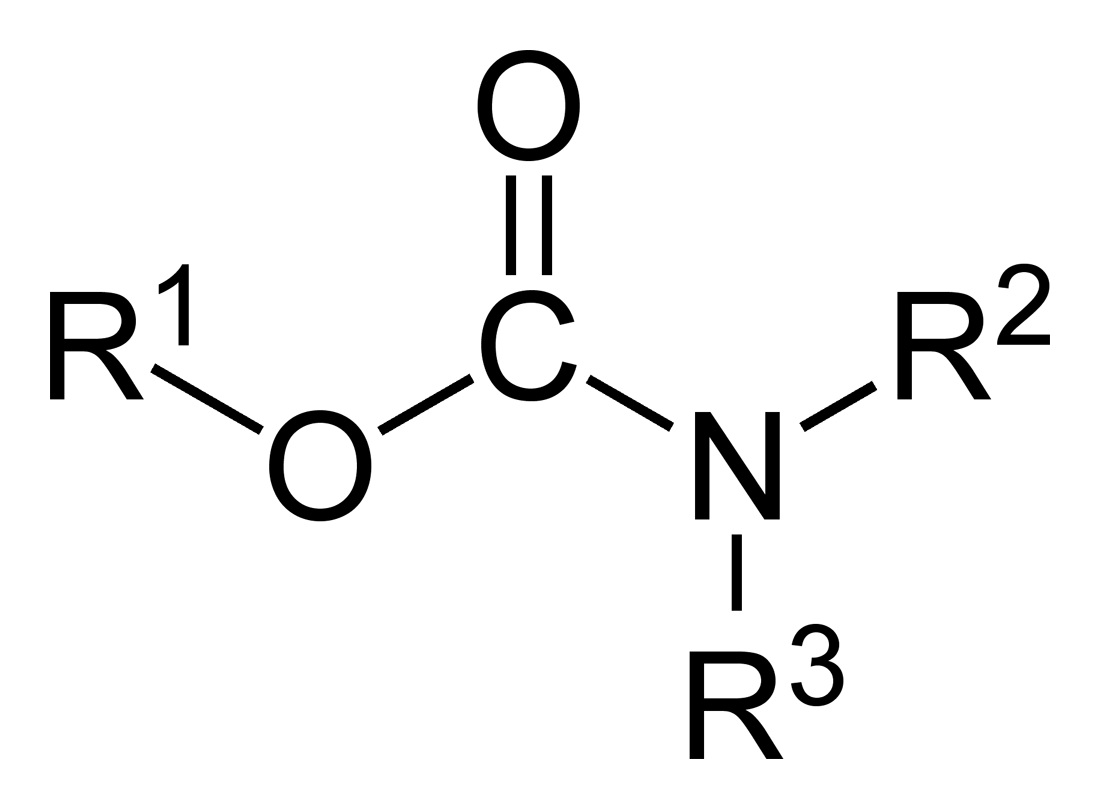
carbamate esters

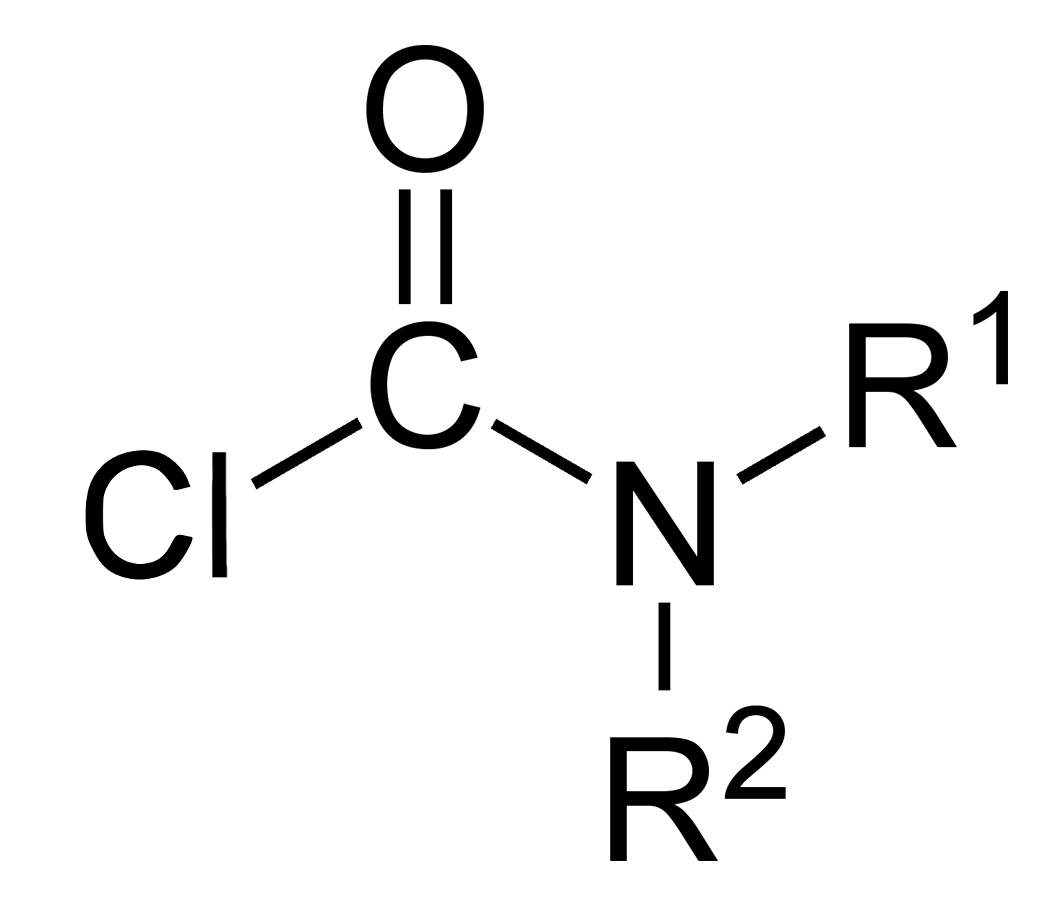
carbamoyl chlorides

=== Carbamic acids ===
Many substituted carbamic acids (RHNCOOH or RR′NCOOH), can be readily synthesized by bubbling carbon dioxide through solutions of the corresponding amine (RNH_{2} or RR′NH, respectively) in an appropriate solvent, such as DMSO or supercritical carbon dioxide. These carbamic acids are generally unstable at room temperature, reverting to the parent amine and carbon dioxide.

=== Carbamate esters ===
Unlike carbamic acids, carbamate esters are generally stable at room temperature as a higher state. They are prepared by reaction of carbamoyl chlorides with alcohols, the addition of alcohols to isocyanates, and the reaction of carbonate esters with ammonia. Methyl carbamate and ethyl carbamate are among the simplest examples and have historically been used in the textile industry, both are now suspected carcinogens. Benzyl carbamate is also known.

== Occurrence in nature ==
The enzyme class carbamate kinase, involved in several metabolic pathways of living organisms, catalyzes the formation of carbamoyl phosphate H_{2}N−C(=O)−O−PO^{2−}_{3}:

ATP + NH_{3} + CO_{2} ⇌ ADP + H_{2}N−C(=O)−O−PO^{2−}_{3}

An important example of an enzyme with this activity is carbamoyl phosphate synthetase, e.g. carbamoyl phosphate synthetase I carrying out the first step of the urea cycle in order to dispose of waste ammonia.

One hemoglobin molecule can carry four molecules of carbon dioxide to the lungs as carbamate groups formed by reaction of CO_{2} with four terminal amine groups of the deoxy form. The resulting compound is called carbaminohaemoglobin.

== Uses ==
=== Industrial ===
Carbamic acid is an intermediate in the industrial production of urea, which involves the reaction of carbon dioxide and ammonia.

CO_{2} + NH_{3} → H_{2}NCOOH
H_{2}NCOOH + NH_{3} → CO(NH_{2})_{2} + H_{2}O

=== Medical ===
Some carbamate esters have use as muscle relaxants, including Emylcamate, Phenprobamate, Styramate and other members of ATC code M03BA. These bind to the barbiturate site of the GABA_{A} receptor.

=== Insecticides ===
Several carbamic acid based insecticides have been developed; for example aldicarb, carbaryl, carbofuran.

=== Chemical synthesis ===
An amine functional group −NH_{2} can be protected from unwanted reactions by being formed as carbamate ester residue –NHC(=O)–OR. Hydrolysis of the ester bond then produces a carbamic acid –NHC(=O)OH, which then loses carbon dioxide yielding the desired amine.
