= C6H15N =

The molecular formula C_{6}H_{15}N (molar mass: 101.19 g/mol, exact mass: 101.1204 u) may refer to:

- Diisopropylamine
- 1,3-Dimethylbutylamine (1,3-DMBA)
- Dipropylamine
- Hexylamine, or n-hexylamine
- Triethylamine
