= Heptyl isocyanate =

- Heptyl isocyanate

Names
- IUPAC name 1-isocyanatoheptane
- Other names: n-Heptyl isocyanate; Heptylmonoisocyanate

Identifiers
CAS Number	4747-81-3
3D model (JSmol)	Interactive image
ChEMBL	ChEMBL67024
ChemSpider	121967
EC Number	625-979-7
PubChem CID	138341
CompTox Dashboard (EPA)	DTXSID10197152
- InChI: InChI=1S/C8H15NO/c1-2-3-4-5-6-7-9-8-10/h2-7H2,1H3 Key: RFXBSYPBSRSQDU-UHFFFAOYSA-N
- SMILES: CCCCCCCN=C=O

Properties
Chemical formula	C_{8}H_{15}NO
Molar mass	141.214 g·mol^{−1}
Appearance	liquid
Density	0.876 g/mL at 25 °C
Boiling point	75 °C (167 °F; 348 K)

Hazards
- GHS labelling
Pictograms	(GHS05: Corrosive) (GHS07: Exclamation mark) (GHS08: Health hazard)
Signal word	Danger
Hazard statements	H302, H312, H315, H317, H318, H332, H334, H335
Precautionary statements	P261, P264, P280, P301, P302, P305, P312, P338, P351, P352
Flash point	63 °C (145 °F; 336 K)

Related compounds
Related compounds	Methyl isocyanate; Ethyl isocyanate; Propyl isocyanate; Butyl isocyanate; Pentyl isocyanate; Hexyl isocyanate
- Except where otherwise noted, data are given for materials in their standard state (at 25 °C [77 °F], 100 kPa). Infobox references

Heptyl isocyanate is an organic chemical compound of carbon, hydrogen, nitrogen, and oxygen with the linear formula CH_{3}(CH_{2})_{6}NCO. The compound is classified as an aliphatic isocyanate, characterized by the presence of the reactive isocyanate functional group (–N=C=O) attached to a heptyl chain.

== Structure ==
Heptyl isocyanate consists of a seven-carbon alkyl chain (heptyl group) bonded to an isocyanate group. The isocyanate group contains a cumulative double bond between nitrogen and carbon, which contributes to the compound's high reactivity.

When the isocyanate group is attached to the second carbon of the heptyl chain, the resulting positional isomer is referred to as 2-heptyl isocyanate.

== Physical properties ==
The compound is a liquid.

== Uses ==
The compound is primarily used as an intermediate in organic chemistry. Its applications include:

- Polymer chemistry: As a monofunctional isocyanate, it is used as a chain terminator or modifying agent in the production of polyurethanes to control molecular weight and introduce specific end-group functionalities.
- Pharmaceutical synthesis: It is employed as a building block or derivatizing agent in the synthesis of certain pharmaceutical compounds, particularly in the formation of carbamate-based drugs or prodrugs.
- Agrochemicals: the compound serves as a precursor in the synthesis of pesticides and herbicides, where the urea or carbamate functional groups are common components.
