= Iodopropynyl butylcarbamate =

Names
- Preferred IUPAC name 3-Iodoprop-2-yn-1-yl butylcarbamate
- Other names 3-Iodo-2-propynyl N-butylcarbamate; 3-Iodo-2-propynyl butylcarbamate; Iodocarb

Identifiers
CAS Number	55406-53-6
3D model (JSmol)	Interactive image
Abbreviations	IPBC
ChEBI	CHEBI:83279
ChemSpider	55933
ECHA InfoCard	100.054.188
PubChem CID	62097
UNII	603P14DHEB
CompTox Dashboard (EPA)	DTXSID0028038
- InChI: InChI=1S/C8H12INO2/c1-2-3-6-10-8(11)12-7-4-5-9/h2-3,6-7H2,1H3,(H,10,11) Key: WYVVKGNFXHOCQV-UHFFFAOYSA-N; InChI=1/C8H12INO2/c1-2-3-6-10-8(11)12-7-4-5-9/h2-3,6-7H2,1H3,(H,10,11) Key: WYVVKGNFXHOCQV-UHFFFAOYAM
- SMILES: IC#CCOC(=O)NCCCC

Properties
Chemical formula	C_{8}H_{12}INO_{2}
Molar mass	281.093 g·mol^{−1}
Appearance	White, crystalline powder
Density	1.575 g/mL
Melting point	66°C
Solubility in water	156 mg/L
- Except where otherwise noted, data are given for materials in their standard state (at 25 °C [77 °F], 100 kPa). Infobox references

Iodopropynyl Butyl Carbamate (IPBC), also known as iodocarb, is a water-soluble preservative used globally in the paints & coatings, wood preservatives, personal care, and cosmetics industries. IPBC is a member of the carbamate family of biocides. It was patented in 1975 and has a long history of effective antifungal use.

== History ==
The element iodine was shown to be a useful germicide in the late 19th century. Investigation of its organic derivatives led in 1908 to the synthesis of a propynyl alcohol compound I−C≡C−CH_{2}−OH which was later patented as having significant antibacterial activity, making it useful in controlling microbial growth on paint surfaces. After this discovery, further compounds containing the iodopropynyl substructure were investigated by companies seeking improved physical and biological properties and in 1975 a patent to IPBC, a carbamate derivative, was published by the Troy Chemical Corporation. It was initially developed under the trade name Troysan for use in the paint and coatings industry as a dry-film preservative to protect interior and exterior coatings from mold, mildew, and fungal growth, while also offering cost performance and sustainability benefits. IPBC exhibits efficacy against a broad spectrum of fungal species, typically at very low use levels. IPBC today is incorporated into a wide variety of interior and exterior paint formulations.

== Manufacture ==
A practical method for the manufacture of IPBC was patented by chemists at ICI.

Butyl isocyanate is reacted with propargyl alcohol in toluene to give a carbamate derivative, which is iodinated using sodium iodide in the presence of sodium hydroxide and sodium hypochlorite with ethanol/water as solvent.

== Uses ==
IPBC is an effective fungicide at very low concentrations in cosmetics, and has shown very low sensitivity in humans tested with this preservative. It controls bacteria including Bacillus subtilis, Escherichia coli, Klebsiella pneumoniae, Pseudomonas aeruginosa and Staphylococcus aureus at rates of application of 250–1000 ppm and the common mold Aspergillus niger at 0.6 ppm. IPBC was approved in 1996 for use up to 0.1% concentrations in topical products and cosmetics. However, this preservative is mostly used at about one-eighth that level. The compound is also used as a fungicide in paint, in wallpaper adhesives and to protect timber against fungi including Coriolus versicolor and Serpula lacrymans.

== Safety ==
IPBC has an acute oral LD_{50} of 1.47 g/kg in rats. Toxicity and safety tests show it to be generally safe: when used properly in leave-on skin products, IPBC is extremely safe. Prior to being approved for cosmetic use in 1996, extensive safety and toxicity tests were conducted on IPBC and their results were gathered along with earlier studies in a report of the Safety Assessment of IPBC by the Cosmetic Ingredient Review. This report found IPBC to be a non-carcinogen with no genotoxicity and in reproductive and developmental toxicity studies using rats and mice, IPBC had no significant effect on fertility, reproductive performance, or on the incidence of fetal malformation. IPBC (as Troysan) was re-registered for use in the U.S. in 2017. In the European Union it is regulated under the REACH system, with an estimated annual production of 10–100 tonnes.

== Mechanism of action ==
The industry-sponsored Fungicide Resistance Action Committee classifies IPBC in its group 28, compounds which act by altering cell membrane permeability. Other members of this group are the carbamates propamocarb and prothiocarb.

== See also ==
- Ingredients of cosmetics
