= C2H5NO2 =

The molecular formula C_{2}H_{5}NO_{2} (molar mass: 75.07 g/mol, exact mass: 75.0320 u) may refer to:

- Acetohydroxamic acid
- Ethyl nitrite
- Glycine
- Methyl carbamate
- Nitroethane
