= Pentyl isocyanate =

- Skeletal formula of pentyl isocyanate

Names
- IUPAC name 1-isocyanatopentane
- Other names: 1-pentyl isocyanate; n-pentyl isocyanate; pentylisocyanate

Identifiers
CAS Number	3954-13-0
3D model (JSmol)	Interactive image
ChemSpider	178519
ECHA InfoCard	100.154.472
EC Number	626-033-6
PubChem CID	206036
CompTox Dashboard (EPA)	DTXSID10192662
- InChI: InChI=1S/C6H11NO/c1-2-3-4-5-7-6-8/h2-5H2,1H3 Key: VRVUKQWNRPNACD-UHFFFAOYSA-N
- SMILES: CCCCCN=C=O

Properties
Chemical formula	C_{6}H_{11}NO
Molar mass	113.160 g·mol^{−1}
Appearance	clear liquid
Density	0.878 g/mL at 25 °C
Boiling point	136–137 °C (277–279 °F; 409–410 K)

Hazards
- GHS labelling
Pictograms	(GHS02: Flammable) (GHS05: Corrosive) (GHS07: Exclamation mark) (GHS08: Health hazard)
Signal word	Danger
Hazard statements	H226, H302, H312, H315, H317, H318, H332, H334, H335
Precautionary statements	P210, P233, P240, P280, P303, P305, P338, P351, P353, P361
Flash point	32 °C (90 °F; 305 K)

Related compounds
Related compounds	Methyl isocyanate; Ethyl isocyanate; Propyl isocyanate; Butyl isocyanate; Hexyl isocyanate; Heptyl isocyanate
- Except where otherwise noted, data are given for materials in their standard state (at 25 °C [77 °F], 100 kPa). Infobox references

Pentyl isocyanate is an organic chemical compound of carbon, hydrogen, nitrogen, and oxygen with the linear formula CH_{3}(CH_{2})_{4}NCO.

== Synthesis ==
The most common industrial route to obtain the compound involves reacting n-pentylamine with phosgene. The reaction typically occurs in an inert organic solvent (like chlorobenzene) to form a carbamoyl chloride intermediate, followed by heating (100–200 °C) to complete the conversion and remove hydrogen chloride (HCl).

CH_{3}(CH_{2})_{4}NH_{2} + COCl_{2} → CH_{3}(CH_{2})_{4}NCO + 2 HCl

== Physical properties ==
Pentyl isocyanate forms a clear, flammable colorless liquid. It is highly toxic.

== Uses ==
The compound is used in a variety of research applications.
