= C7H14N2O4S =

The molecular formula C_{7}H_{14}N_{2}O_{4}S may refer to:

- Aldoxycarb
- Cystathionine
