= Aldoxycarb =

Identifiers
CAS Number	1646-88-4
3D model (JSmol)	Interactive image
ChEBI	CHEBI:82051
ChEMBL	ChEMBL2138916
ChemSpider	7844561
ECHA InfoCard	100.015.192
KEGG	C18906
PubChem CID	9570093
UNII	IL70ANS043
CompTox Dashboard (EPA)	DTXSID50859666 DTXSID6023862, DTXSID50859666
- InChI: InChI=1S/C7H14N2O4S/c1-7(2,14(4,11)12)5-9-13-6(10)8-3/h5H,1-4H3,(H,8,10)/b9-5+ Key: YRRKLBAKDXSTNC-WEVVVXLNSA-N
- SMILES: CC(C)(/C=N/OC(=O)NC)S(=O)(=O)C
- Except where otherwise noted, data are given for materials in their standard state (at 25 °C [77 °F], 100 kPa). Infobox references

Aldoxycarb is an active ingredient for crop protection from the group of oxime-acid amides, used as an insecticide, for example on tobacco plants.

== Properties ==
Aldoxycarb is the sulfone analogue of the insecticide aldicarb. Studies indicate that residues of aldicarb or aldoxycarb do not enter the drinking water supply. Most residues are degraded in the unsaturated zone with a half-life of 0.5 to 2 months. Aldoxycarb and aldicarb degrade at a comparable rate.

In another study, aldicarb and aldoxycarb (2.24 kg/ha) increased seed potato yields by approximately 40%. The active ingredient oxamyl proved comparably effective. In addition, the control of nematodes in potatoes by aldicarb, aldoxycarb, and oxamyl was confirmed.

== Synthesis ==
Aldoxycarb is obtained by reacting aldicarb with hydrogen peroxide:

Aldoxycarb synthesis

== Trade name ==
A plant protection product containing the active ingredient aldoxycarb is marketed under the trade name Standak.

== Authorization ==
No plant protection products containing aldoxycarb are authorized in the European Union or Switzerland.
