= Butocarboxim =

Names
- IUPAC name 6,7-Dimethyl-4-oxa-8-thia-2,5-diazanon-5-en-3-one

Identifiers
CAS Number	34681-10-2
3D model (JSmol)	Interactive image
Beilstein Reference	2087348
ChEBI	CHEBI:38465
ChemSpider	33840
ECHA InfoCard	100.047.385
EC Number	252-139-3
KEGG	C18645
PubChem CID	5360962
UNII	N64057402F
CompTox Dashboard (EPA)	DTXSID5058062
- InChI: InChI=1S/C7H14N2O2S/c1-5(6(2)12-4)9-11-7(10)8-3/h6H,1-4H3,(H,8,10)/b9-5+ Key: SFNPDDSJBGRXLW-WEVVVXLNSA-N
- SMILES: CC(C(=NOC(=O)NC)C)SC

Properties
Chemical formula	C_{7}H_{14}N_{2}O_{2}S
Molar mass	190.26 g·mol^{−1}

Related compounds
Related compounds	Aldicarb
- Except where otherwise noted, data are given for materials in their standard state (at 25 °C [77 °F], 100 kPa). Infobox references

Butocarboxim is a carbamate insecticide. It is a structural isomer of aldicarb.

== See also ==
- Carbamate insecticide
- Aldicarb
