= Methomyl =

(E)-Methomyl
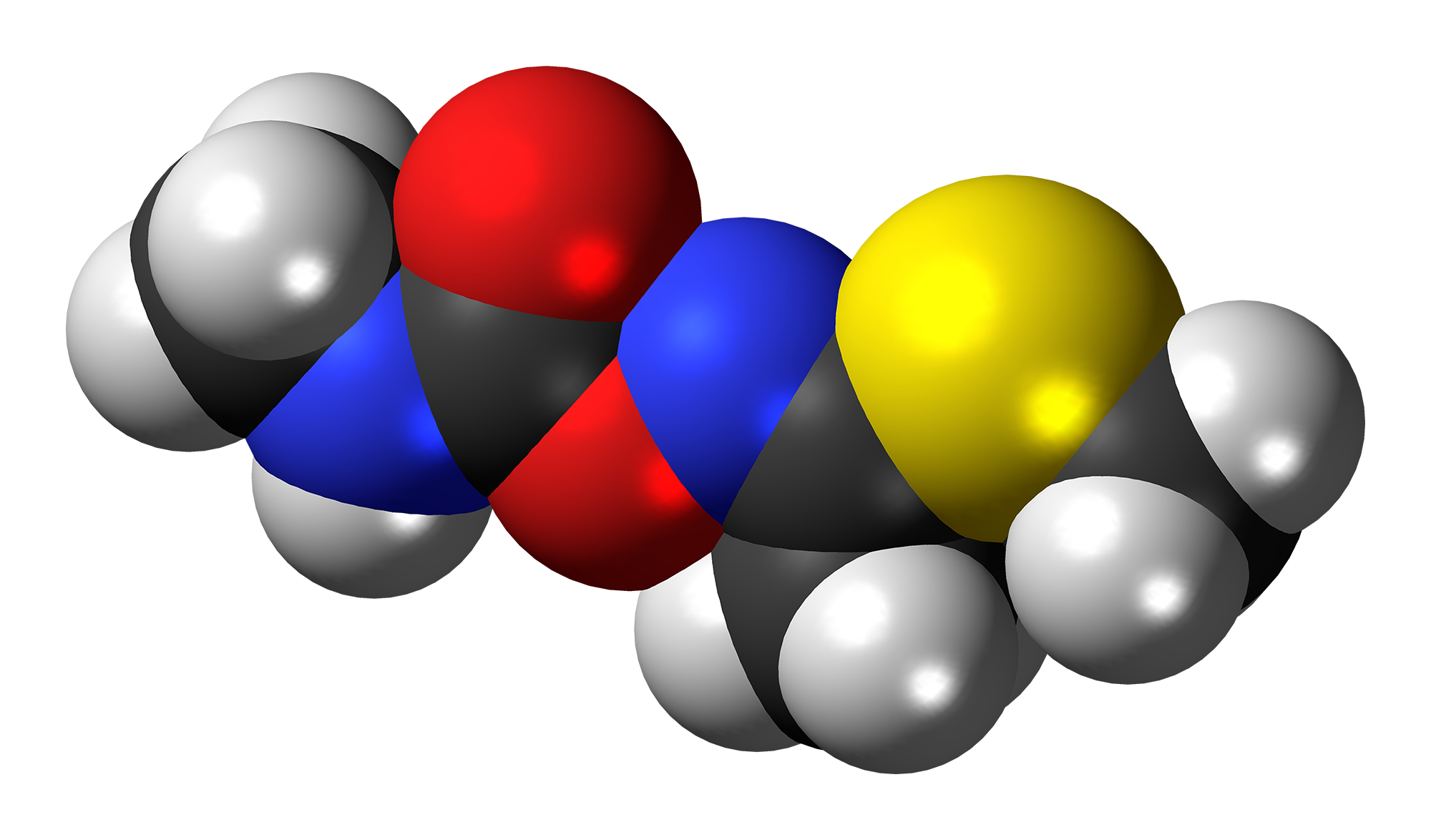

(Z)-Methomyl
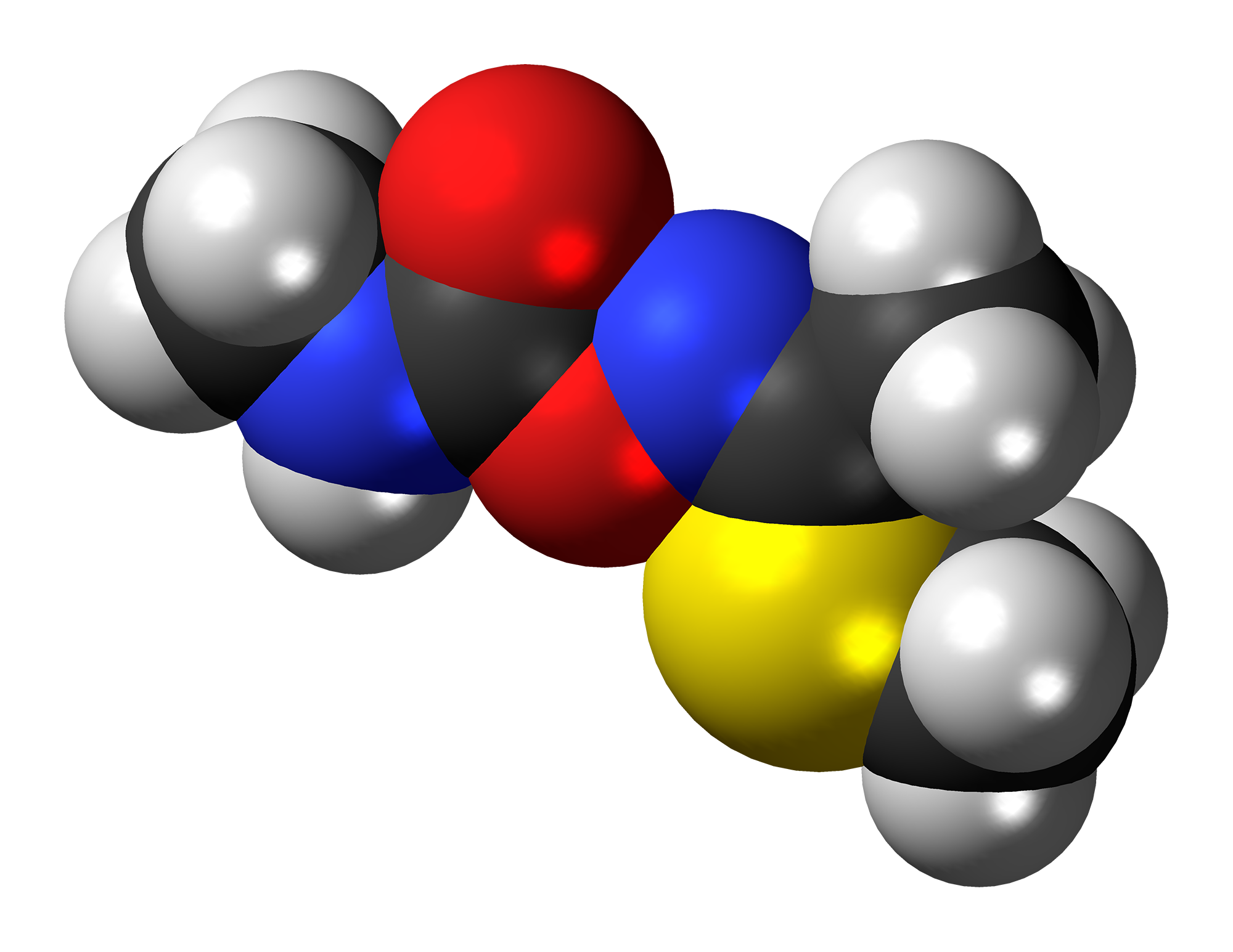

Names
- IUPAC name (E,Z)-methyl N-{[(methylamino)carbonyl]oxy}ethanimidothioate
- Other names Lannate, Mesomile, Methomex, Nudrin

Identifiers
CAS Number	16752-77-5
3D model (JSmol)	Interactive image
ChEBI	CHEBI:6835
ChEMBL	ChEMBL552761
ChemSpider	3966
ECHA InfoCard	100.037.089
PubChem CID	5353758
UNII	1NQ08HN02S
CompTox Dashboard (EPA)	DTXSID1022267
- InChI: InChI=1S/C5H10N2O2S/c1-4(10-3)7-9-5(8)6-2/h1-3H3,(H,6,8) Key: UHXUZOCRWCRNSJ-UHFFFAOYSA-N; InChI=1/C5H10N2O2S/c1-4(10-3)7-9-5(8)6-2/h1-3H3,(H,6,8) Key: UHXUZOCRWCRNSJ-UHFFFAOYAU
- SMILES: CNC(=O)ON=C(C)SC

Properties
Chemical formula	C_{5}H_{10}N_{2}O_{2}S
Molar mass	162.20
Appearance	White crystalline solid
Odor	Slight, sulfur-like
Density	1.2946 g/cm^{3}
Melting point	78 to 79 °C (172 to 174 °F; 351 to 352 K)
Solubility in water	58 g/L
Vapor pressure	0.00005 mmHg (25°C)

Hazards
Flash point	Noncombustible
- NIOSH (US health exposure limits)
PEL (Permissible)	none
REL (Recommended)	TWA 2.5 mg/m^{3}
IDLH (Immediate danger)	N.D.
- Except where otherwise noted, data are given for materials in their standard state (at 25 °C [77 °F], 100 kPa). verify (what is ?) Infobox references

Methomyl is a carbamate insecticide introduced in 1966. It is highly toxic to humans, livestock, pets, and wildlife. The EU imposed a pesticide residue limit of 0.01 mg/kg for all fruit and vegetables.

Methomyl is a common active ingredient in commercial fly bait, for which the label instructions in the United States warn that "It is a violation of Federal Law to use this product in a manner inconsistent with its labeling." "Off-label" uses and other uses not specifically targeted at problem insects are illegal, dangerous, and ill-advised.

== Use ==
Methomyl is a broad-spectrum insecticide that is used to kill insect pests. Methomyl is registered for commercial/professional use under certain conditions on sites including field, vegetable, and orchard crops; turf (sod farms only); livestock quarters; commercial premises; and refuse containers. Products containing 1% Methomyl are available to the general public for retail sale, but more potent formulations are classified as restricted-use pesticides: not registered for homeowner or non-professional application. However, Heliothis virescens developed a resistance to methomyl within 5 years. Other species like Helicoverpa assulta also developed resistance after exposure.

== Toxicity ==
In acute toxicity testing, methomyl is placed in EPA Toxicity Category I (the highest toxicity category out of four) via the oral route and in eye irritation studies. It is in lower Toxicity Categories for inhalation (Category II), acute dermal effects (Category III), and acute skin irritation (Category IV). Methomyl is not likely to be a carcinogen (EPA carcinogen Category E).

== Ecotoxicity ==
Methomyl has low persistence in the soil environment, with a reported half-life of approximately 14 days. Because of its high solubility in water, and low affinity for soil binding methomyl may have potential for groundwater contamination. The estimated aqueous half-life for the insecticide is 6 days in surface water and over 25 weeks in groundwater.

== Synthesis ==
First prepare thioester:

Second prepare oxime from thioester:

Third prepare product from methyl isocyanate and the finished oxime:

== Trade names ==
Common names for methomyl include metomil and mesomile. Trade names include Acinate, Agrinate, DuPont 1179, Flytek, Kipsin, Lannate, Lanox, Memilene, Methavin, Methomex, Nudrin, NuBait, Pillarmate and SD 14999
