= Methyl carbamate =

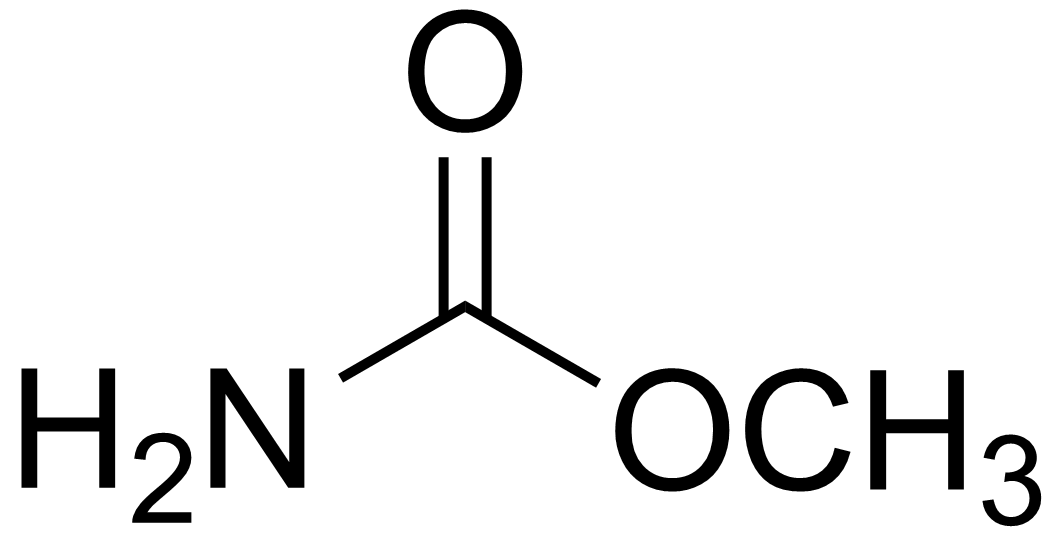
- Structural formula

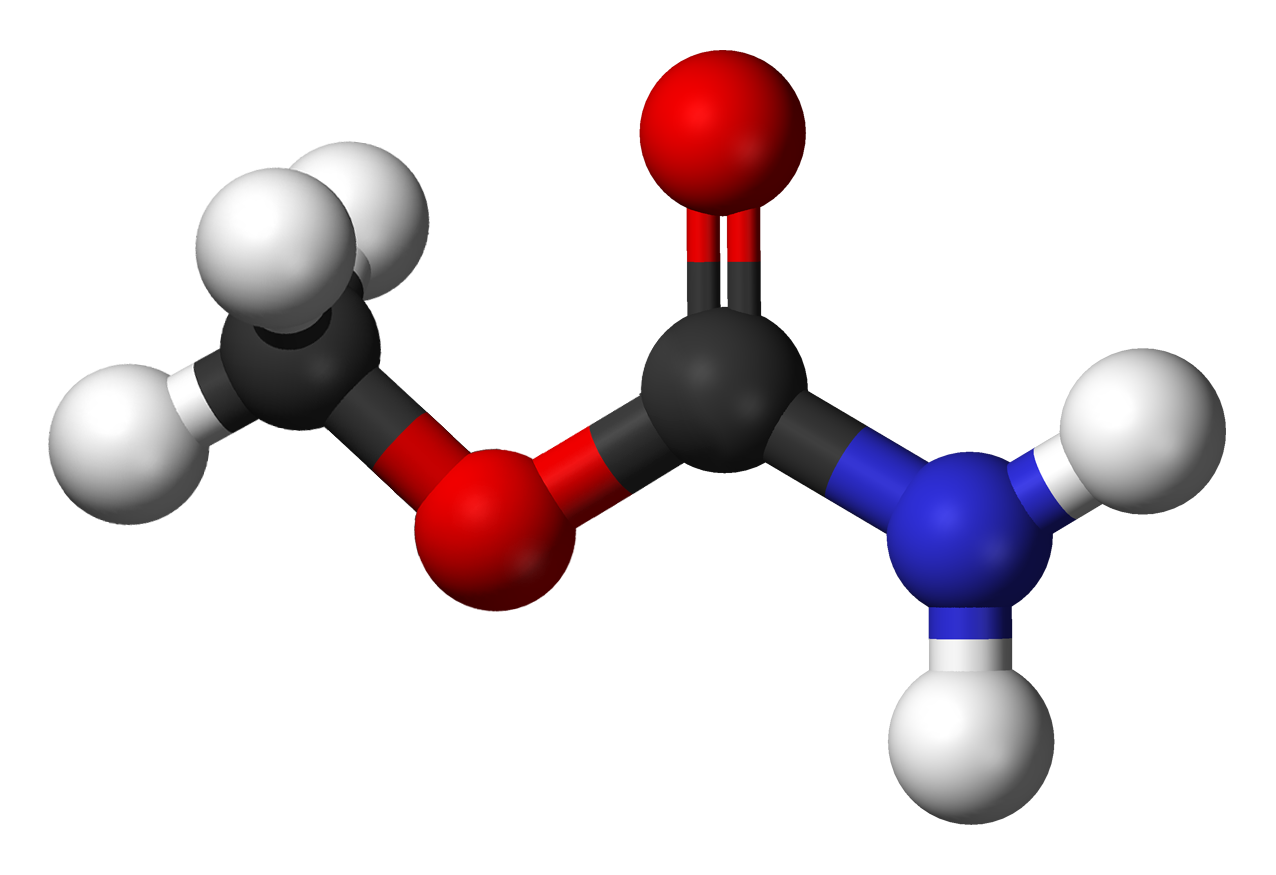
- Ball-and-stick model

Names
- Preferred IUPAC name Methyl carbamate

Identifiers
CAS Number	598-55-0
3D model (JSmol)	Interactive image
ChEBI	CHEBI:76606
ChEMBL	ChEMBL1085707
ChemSpider	11229
ECHA InfoCard	100.009.037
KEGG	C19445
PubChem CID	11722
UNII	9WFX634X2T
CompTox Dashboard (EPA)	DTXSID8020834
- InChI: InChI=1S/C2H5NO2/c1-5-2(3)4/h1H3,(H2,3,4) Key: GTCAXTIRRLKXRU-UHFFFAOYSA-N; InChI=1/C2H5NO2/c1-5-2(3)4/h1H3,(H2,3,4) Key: GTCAXTIRRLKXRU-UHFFFAOYAJ
- SMILES: O=C(OC)N

Properties
Chemical formula	C_{2}H_{5}NO_{2}
Molar mass	75.067 g·mol^{−1}
Appearance	white solid
Density	1.136 (56 °C)
Melting point	52 °C (126 °F; 325 K)
Boiling point	177 °C (351 °F; 450 K)
Solubility in water	20 g/L
- Except where otherwise noted, data are given for materials in their standard state (at 25 °C [77 °F], 100 kPa). verify (what is ?) Infobox references

Methyl carbamate (also called methylurethane, or urethylane) is an organic compound and the simplest ester of carbamic acid (H_{2}NCO_{2}H). It is a colourless solid.

Methyl carbamate is prepared by the reaction of methanol and urea:

CO(NH_{2})_{2} + CH_{3}OH → CH_{3}OC(O)NH_{2} + NH_{3}

It also forms in the reaction of ammonia with methyl chloroformate or dimethyl carbonate.

== Safety and occurrence ==
Unlike its close relative ethyl carbamate it is not mutagenic in Salmonella (it tested negative in the Ames test), but it is mutagenic in Drosophila. Experimental evidence does show that it is a carcinogen in rats, and not carcinogenic in mice. The compound is "known to the state of California to cause cancer" per Proposition 65.

== Production, use, and exposure ==
The compound was detected in wines preserved with dimethyl dicarbonate.

Methyl carbamate is used primarily in the textile and polymer industries as a reactive intermediate. In the textile industry, it is used in the manufacture of dimethylol methyl carbamate-based resins that are applied on polyester cotton blend fabrics as durable-press finishes. The treated fabrics have good crease-angle retention, resist acid souring in commercial laundries, do not retain chlorine, and have flame-retardant properties. Methyl carbamate also is used in the manufacture of pharmaceuticals, insecticides, and urethane.

N-Methyl carbamates are widely used as insecticides. They have anticholinesterase activity without a cumulative effect.

== See also ==
- Carbamate
- Ethyl carbamate (urethane)
