= Ethyl carbamate =

- Structural formula of ethyl carbamate

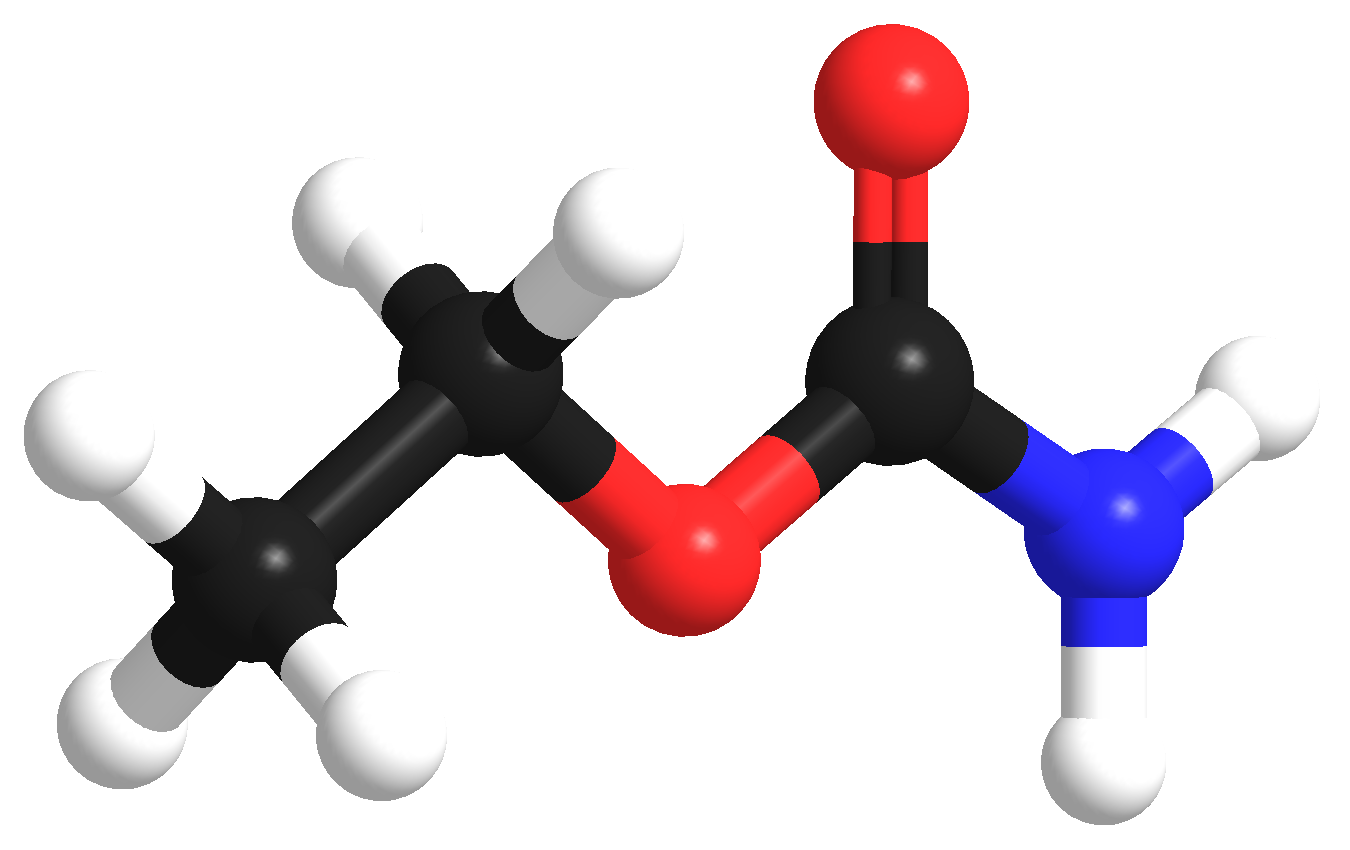

Names
- Preferred IUPAC name Ethyl carbamate
- Other names Carbamic acid ethyl ester, Urethane, Ethylurethane

Identifiers
CAS Number	51-79-6
3D model (JSmol)	Interactive image; Interactive image
ChEBI	CHEBI:17967
ChEMBL	ChEMBL462547
ChemSpider	5439
DrugBank	DB04827
ECHA InfoCard	100.000.113
EC Number	200-123-1
KEGG	C01537
MeSH	Urethane
PubChem CID	5641
RTECS number	FA8400000
UNII	3IN71E75Z5
UN number	2811
CompTox Dashboard (EPA)	DTXSID9021427
- InChI: InChI=1S/C3H7NO2/c1-2-6-3(4)5/h2H2,1H3,(H2,4,5) Key: JOYRKODLDBILNP-UHFFFAOYSA-N; InChI=1/C3H7NO2/c1-2-6-3(4)5/h2H2,1H3,(H2,4,5) Key: JOYRKODLDBILNP-UHFFFAOYAY
- SMILES: CCOC(N)=O; O=C(OCC)N

Properties
Chemical formula	C_{3}H_{7}NO_{2}
Molar mass	89.094 g·mol^{−1}
Appearance	White crystals
Density	1.056 g cm^{−3}
Melting point	46 to 50 °C (115 to 122 °F; 319 to 323 K)
Boiling point	182 to 185 °C (360 to 365 °F; 455 to 458 K)
Solubility in water	0.480 g cm^{−3} at 15 °C
log P	−0.190(4)
Vapor pressure	1.3 kPa at 78 °C
Acidity (pK_{a})	13.58
Dipole moment	2.59 D

Hazards
- Occupational safety and health (OHS/OSH)
Main hazards	Harmful if swallowed May cause cancer
- GHS labelling
Pictograms	(GHS07: Exclamation mark) (GHS08: Health hazard)
Signal word	Danger
Hazard statements	H302, H350
Precautionary statements	P201, P301+P312+P330, P308+P313
NFPA 704 (fire diamond)	1 2 0
Flash point	92 °C (198 °F; 365 K)

Related compounds
Related compounds	Methyl carbamate Propyl carbamate
- Except where otherwise noted, data are given for materials in their standard state (at 25 °C [77 °F], 100 kPa). verify (what is ?) Infobox references

Ethyl carbamate (also called urethane) is an organic compound with the formula CH_{3}CH_{2}OC(O)NH_{2}. It is an ester of carbamic acid and a white solid. Despite its name, it is not a component of polyurethanes. Because it is a carcinogen, it is rarely used, but naturally forms in low quantities in many types of fermented foods and drinks.

== Synthesis ==
It is produced industrially by heating urea and ethyl alcohol. It also arises by the action of ammonia on ethyl chloroformate.

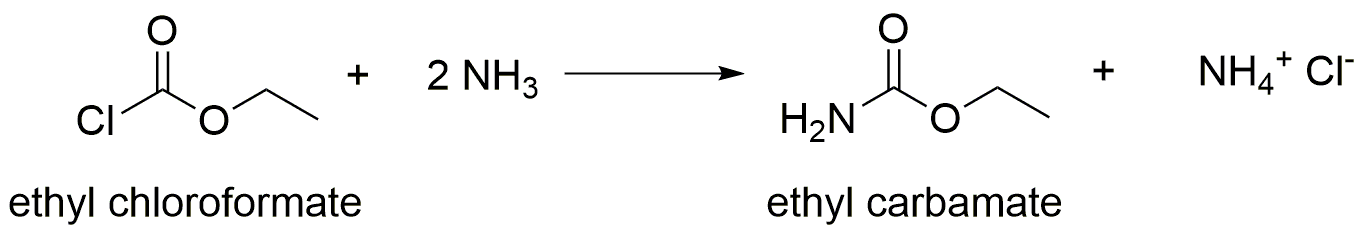
Synthesis of ethyl carbamate

== Uses ==
=== Biomedical applications ===
Ethyl carbamate was originally used as an antineoplastic agent, hypnotic, sclerosing agent, adjunct to sulfonamide therapy, and topical bactericide. It was discovered to be carcinogenic in 1943 and largely ineffective at treating multiple myeloma, according to a study published in 1966. It was removed from the market in the US, UK and Canada in 1963 and was classified as a 2B carcinogen by the IARC in 1974.

However, its use in Japan as a co-solvent in water for dissolving water-insoluble analgesics used for post-operation pain, at doses estimated to be at levels that are carcinogenic in mice, continued until 1975. Miller has suggested that this may have been the "largest number (millions) of humans exposed to the largest doses of a pure carcinogen that is on record" and called for studies to determine the effects on Japanese cancer rates to be performed.

Ethyl carbamate continues to be used as an anaesthetic in animal experiments, with more than 100 animal studies using ethyl carbamate published each year. One advantage of using ethyl carbamate is that it has a very long duration of action, with some adult rats remaining anaesthetised 24 hours after administration of the drug. It also does not depress neuronal activity in the cortex to the same extent as isoflurane.

=== Other uses ===
Ethyl carbamate was primarily an intermediate in the preparation of amino resins, that were in turn used as crosslinking agents for permanent-press textile treatments to create "wash-and-wear" fabrics. Other uses included as solvent or intermediates in the manufacture of pesticides, cosmetics and pharmaceuticals.

== Occurrence in beverages and food ==
The widespread presence of ethyl carbamate in alcoholic beverages was discovered during the mid-1980s. To raise public awareness of this issue, the U.S. Center for Science in the Public Interest published, in 1987, Tainted Booze: The Consumer's Guide to Urethane in Alcoholic Beverages. Studies have shown that most, if not all, yeast-fermented alcoholic beverages contain traces of ethyl carbamate (15 ppb to 12 ppm). Other foods and beverages prepared by means of fermentation also contain ethyl carbamate. For example, bread has been found to contain 2 ppb; as much as 20 ppb has been found in some samples of soy sauce. Amounts of both ethyl carbamate and methyl carbamate have also been found in wines, sake, beer, brandy, whiskey and other fermented alcoholic beverages.

It has been shown that ethyl carbamate forms from the reaction of ethanol with urea:

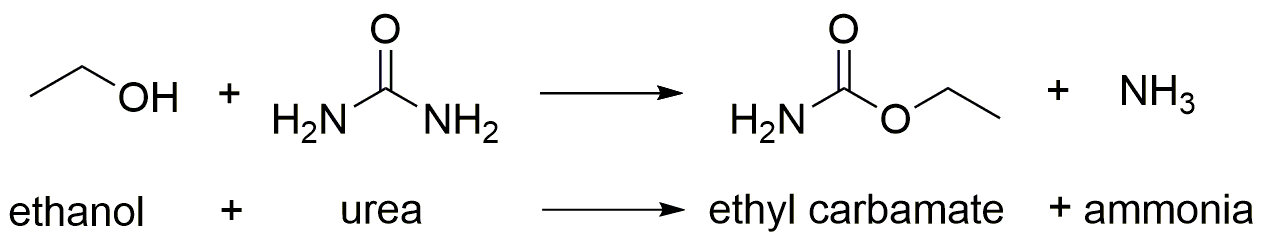

This reaction occurs much faster at higher temperatures, and therefore higher concentrations of ethyl carbamate are found in beverages that are heated during processing, such as brandy, whiskey, and other distilled beverages. Additionally, heating after bottling either during shipping or in preparation will cause ethyl carbamate levels to rise further.

The urea in wines results from the metabolism of arginine or citrulline by yeast or other organisms. The urea waste product is initially metabolised inside the yeast cell until it builds up to a certain level. At that point, it is excreted externally where it is able to react with the alcohol to create ethyl carbamate.

In 1988, wine and other alcoholic beverage manufacturers in the United States agreed to control the level of ethyl carbamate in wine to less than 15 ppb (parts per billion), and in stronger alcoholic drinks to less than 125 ppb.

Although the urea cannot be eliminated, it can be minimized by controlling the fertilization of grape vines, minimizing their heat exposure, using self-cloning yeast and other actions. Furthermore, some strains of yeast have been developed to help reduce ethyl carbamate during commercial production of alcoholic beverages.

Another important mechanism for ethyl carbamate formation in alcoholic beverages is the reaction from cyanide as precursor, which causes comparably high levels in spirits derived from cyanogenic plants, such as rhum agricole.

== Hazards ==
No direct studies have found ethyl carbamate to be acutely toxic to or carcinogenic in humans. However, studies with rats, mice, and hamsters have shown that ethyl carbamate causes cancer when administered orally, injected, or applied to the skin, and the lowest fatal dose in rats, mice, and rabbits was calculated to be 1.2 g/kg at the least. When ethyl carbamate was used medicinally, about 50% of the patients exhibited nausea and vomiting, and long-time use led to gastroenteric hemorrhages. The compound has almost no odor and a cooling, saline, bitter taste.

In 2007, the International Agency for Research on Cancer raised ethyl carbamate to a Group 2A carcinogen, "probably carcinogenic to humans". The IARC has stated that ethyl carbamate can be "reasonably anticipated to be a human carcinogen based on sufficient evidence of carcinogenicity in experimental animals". In 2006, the Liquor Control Board of Ontario in Canada rejected imported cases of sherry due to excessive levels of ethyl carbamate.

Studies in Hong Kong (2009) and Korea (2015) outline the extent of the accumulative exposure to ethyl carbamate in daily life. Fermented foods such as soy sauce, kimchi, soybean paste, breads, rolls, buns, crackers and bean curd, along with wine, sake and plum wine, were found to be the foods with the highest ethyl carbamate levels in traditional Asian diets.

In 2005, the JECFA (Joint FAO/WHO Expert Committee On Food Additives) risk-assessment evaluation of ethyl carbamate concluded that the margin of exposure to ethyl carbamate from daily food and alcoholic beverages combined is of concern, and mitigation measures to reduce ethyl carbamate in some alcoholic beverages should continue. Ethyl carbamate exposure through alcoholic beverages has been discussed by multiple health authorities, while the cumulative daily exposure in the typical diet is also an issue of rising concern that merits closer observation. The Korean study concluded that "it would be desirable to closely monitor ethyl carbamate levels in Korean foods and find ways to reduce the daily intake."

The following US regulators have mentioned urethane:

- NESHAP: Listed as a Hazardous Air Pollutant (HAP)
- Comprehensive Environmental Response, Compensation, and Liability Act: Reportable Quantity (RQ) = 100 lb
- Emergency Planning and Community Right-To-Know Act, EPA's Toxics Release Inventory: A listed substance subject to RCRA reporting requirements
- RCRA Listed Hazardous Waste: substance - U238

== Detection in alcoholic beverages ==
The concerns raised by the toxicological aspects of EC together with the low concentration levels (μg/L) found in wines, as well as the occurrence of interferences on detection, has motivated several researchers to develop new methods to determine it in wines. Several extraction and chromatographic techniques have been used, including continuous liquid–liquid extraction (LLE) with Soxhlet apparatus, derivatization with 9-xanthydrol followed by high-performance liquid chromatography (HPLC) with fluorescence detection and even LLE after derivatization, followed by gas chromatography coupled with mass spectrometry detection (GC–MS). On the other hand, the reference method set by the International Organization of Vine and Wine (OIV) uses solid phase extraction (SPE) preceding GC–MS quantification. Other methods also make use of SPE, but use gas chromatography with mass spectrometry (MDGC/MS) and liquid chromatography with tandem mass spectrometry (LC–MS/MS) for detection. Most of the methodologies found in the literature to quantify EC use gas chromatography, using LLE and SPE as extraction techniques. Nevertheless, several efforts have also been done to develop new methodologies to determine EC without using long procedures and hard-working analyses, combining precision to high sensitivity. In this regard, headspace solid phase microextraction (HS-SPME) has been gaining great highlighting and alternative methodologies has been proposed using the most recent identification and quantification technology, such as gas chromatography with tandem mass spectrometry detection (GC–MS/MS) and two-dimensional gas chromatography with time-of-flight mass spectrometry (GC × GC–ToFMS).

Microextraction by packed sorbent (MEPS) is also feasible. MEPS/GC–MS methodology has been applied to quantify EC in wines.

Miniaturized liquid-liquid extraction (mLLE) followed by LC-MS/MS can be used to determine EC in wine, without using derivatizing agents.

== Related compounds ==
Other carbamates include methyl carbamate, butyl carbamate, and phenyl carbamate (m. p. 149–152 °C), which can also be prepared from the corresponding chloroformate and ammonia. These esters are white, crystalline solids at room temperature. Except for the phenyl carbamate, they sublime at moderate temperatures; methyl carbamate sublimes at room temperatures. The first two and ethyl carbamate are very soluble in water, benzene, and ether. These other carbamates (methyl, butyl, and phenyl) are only used in small quantities for research purposes.

== See also ==
- Carbamate
- Methyl carbamate
