= Ethyl isocyanate =

- Skeletal formula of ethyl isocyanate

Names
- IUPAC name Isocyanatoethane
- Other names NSC 89687

Identifiers
CAS Number	109-90-0
3D model (JSmol)	Interactive image
ChEBI	CHEBI:85107
ChemSpider	7731
ECHA InfoCard	100.003.381
EC Number	203-717-9
PubChem CID	8022
UNII	B02YQ4MIR0
UN number	2481 (ETHYL ISOCYANATE)
CompTox Dashboard (EPA)	DTXSID5059379
- InChI: InChI=1S/C3H5NO/c1-2-4-3-5/h2H2,1H3 Key: WUDNUHPRLBTKOJ-UHFFFAOYSA-N
- SMILES: O=C=NCC

Properties
Chemical formula	C_{3}H_{5}NO
Molar mass	71.079 g·mol^{−1}
Appearance	colourless liquid with a pungent odor
Density	0.91 g/cm^{3}
Boiling point	59–61 °C (138–142 °F; 332–334 K)
Solubility in water	Decomposes in water
Solubility	Miscible in ethanol, ether soluble in chlorinated and aromatic hydrocarbons
Vapor pressure	17.5 mmHg
Refractive index (n_{D})	1.3808 at 20 °C/D

Thermochemistry
Std enthalpy of combustion (Δ_{c}H^{⦵}_{298})	424.5 kcal (liquid)

Hazards
- GHS labelling
Pictograms	(GHS02: Flammable) (GHS06: Toxic) (GHS07: Exclamation mark) (GHS08: Health hazard)
Signal word	Danger
Hazard statements	H225, H301, H302, H312, H315, H319, H330, H332, H334, H335
Precautionary statements	P210, P233, P240, P241, P242, P243, P260, P264, P264+P265, P270, P271, P280, P284, P301+P316, P301+P317, P302+P352, P303+P361+P353, P304+P340, P305+P351+P338, P316, P317, P319, P320, P321, P330, P332+P317, P337+P317, P342+P316, P362+P364, P370+P378, P403, P403+P233, P403+P235, P405, P501

Related compounds
Related compounds	Methyl isocyanate; Propyl isocyanate; Butyl isocyanate; Pentyl isocyanate; Hexyl isocyanate; Heptyl isocyanate
- Except where otherwise noted, data are given for materials in their standard state (at 25 °C [77 °F], 100 kPa). Infobox references

Ethyl isocyanate is an organic chemical compound of carbon, hydrogen, nitrogen and oxygen with the molecular formula C_{3}H_{5}NO. The compound belongs to the group of isocyanates. Its structural formula is CH_{3}—CH_{2}—NCO.

== Synthesis ==
Ethyl isocyanate can be obtained by reacting triphosgene with ethylamine hydrochloride in xylene.

== Physical properties ==
Ethyl isocyanate is a highly flammable, volatile, colorless liquid with a pungent odor that decomposes in water.

C_{3}H_{5}NO + H_{2}O → CO_{2} + NH_{2}C_{2}H_{5}

== Uses ==
The compound is used in the production of pharmaceuticals and pesticides.
