= Propyl isocyanate =

- Skeletal formula of propyl isocyanate

Names
- IUPAC name 1-isocyanatopropane
- Other names: 1-propyl isocyanate; n-propyl isocyanate; PIC

Identifiers
CAS Number	110-78-1
3D model (JSmol)	Interactive image
ChEMBL	ChEMBL441027
ChemSpider	54992
ECHA InfoCard	100.003.458
EC Number	203-803-6
PubChem CID	61033
UNII	EW62LG5TQ7
CompTox Dashboard (EPA)	DTXSID5051571
- InChI: InChI=1S/C4H7NO/c1-2-3-5-4-6/h2-3H2,1H3 Key: OQURWGJAWSLGQG-UHFFFAOYSA-N
- SMILES: CCCN=C=O

Properties
Chemical formula	C_{4}H_{7}NO
Molar mass	85.106 g·mol^{−1}
Appearance	colourless liquid with a pungent odor
Density	0.908 g/cm^{3}
Melting point	−30 °C (−22 °F; 243 K)
Boiling point	83–84 °C (181–183 °F; 356–357 K)
Solubility in water	decomposes in water

Hazards
- GHS labelling
Pictograms	(GHS02: Flammable) (GHS05: Corrosive) (GHS07: Exclamation mark) (GHS08: Health hazard)
Signal word	Danger
Hazard statements	H225, H302, H312, H315, H317, H318, H332, H334, H335
Precautionary statements	P210, P233, P240, P241, P242, P243, P260, P264, P264+P265, P270, P271, P272, P280, P284, P301+P317, P302+P352, P303+P361+P353, P304+P340, P305+P354+P338, P317, P319, P321, P330, P333+P317, P342+P316, P362+P364, P370+P378, P403, P403+P233, P403+P235, P405, P501
Flash point	0 °C (32 °F; 273 K)

Related compounds
Related compounds	Methyl isocyanate; Ethyl isocyanate; Butyl isocyanate; Pentyl isocyanate; Hexyl isocyanate; Heptyl isocyanate
- Except where otherwise noted, data are given for materials in their standard state (at 25 °C [77 °F], 100 kPa). Infobox references

Propyl isocyanate is an organic chemical compound of carbon, hydrogen, nitrogen, and oxygen with the linear formula CH_{3}CH_{2}CH_{2}NCO.

== Synthesis ==
Propyl isocyanate is usually produced by a condensation reaction or by Fischer–Speier esterification with sulfuric acid as a catalyst.

== Physical properties ==
Propyl isocyanate is sparingly soluble in water, reacts with water, but very soluble in alcohol, diethyl ether, chloroform, and most organic solvents.

The compound forms a highly flammable, colorless liquid with a sharp odor. Very toxic by ingestion, may cause burns and death.

== Chemical properties ==
Propyl isocyanate reacts with strong oxidizing agents and strong bases and possesses antifungal and antibacterial properties. Reacts vigorously with water, producing a toxic vapor.

== Uses ==
The compound is used in production of other chemicals and insecticides.
