= Fenobucarb =

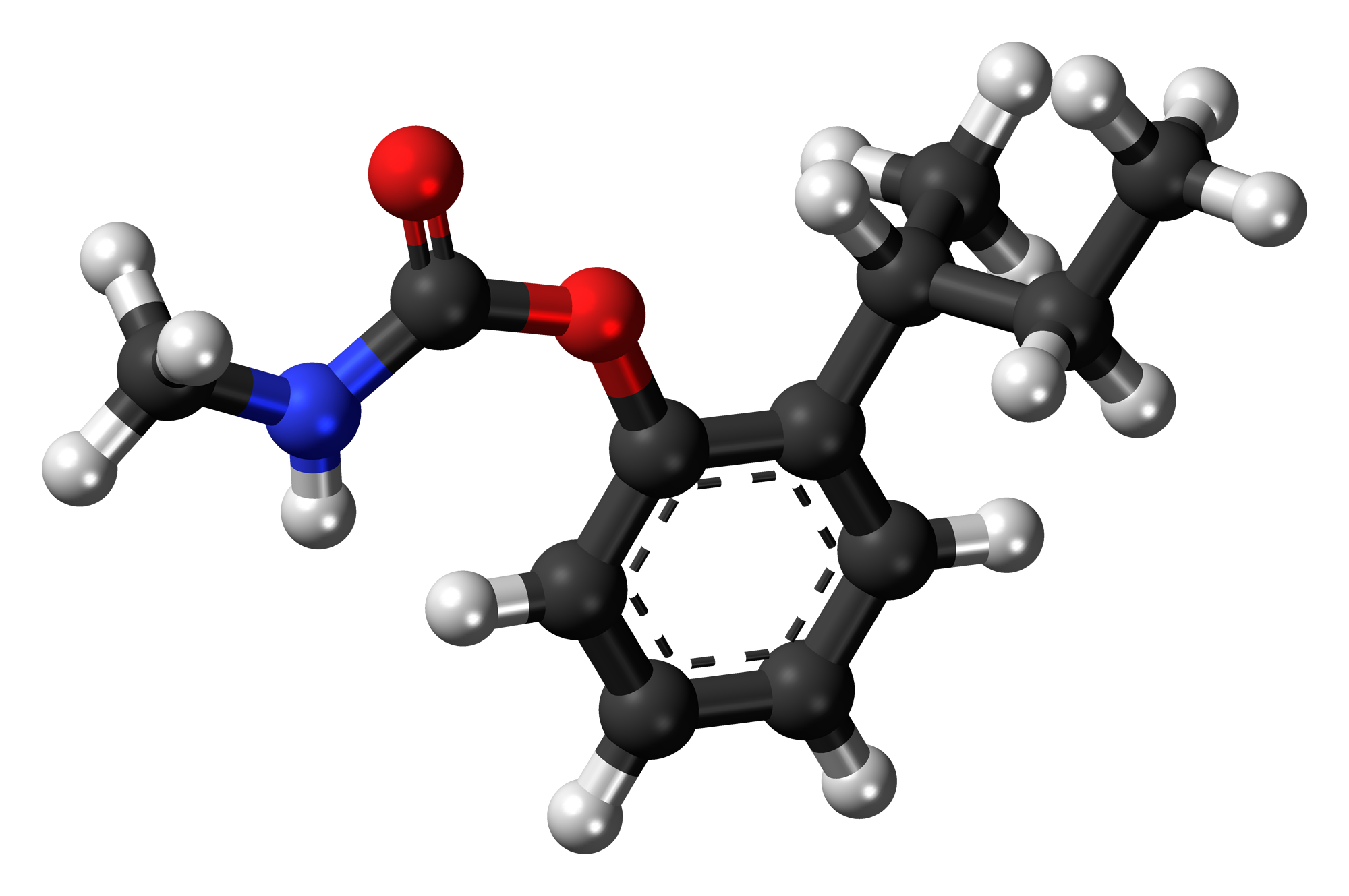

Names
- Preferred IUPAC name 2-(Butan-2-yl)phenyl methylcarbamate
- Other names BPMC

Identifiers
CAS Number	3766-81-2
3D model (JSmol)	Interactive image
ChEBI	CHEBI:34304
ChEMBL	ChEMBL226650
ChemSpider	18452
ECHA InfoCard	100.021.081
KEGG	C14425
PubChem CID	19588
UNII	5MS2P7M0CF
CompTox Dashboard (EPA)	DTXSID4058077
- InChI: InChI=1S/C12H17NO2/c1-4-9(2)10-7-5-6-8-11(10)15-12(14)13-3/h5-9H,4H2,1-3H3,(H,13,14) Key: DIRFUJHNVNOBMY-UHFFFAOYSA-N; InChI=1/C12H17NO2/c1-4-9(2)10-7-5-6-8-11(10)15-12(14)13-3/h5-9H,4H2,1-3H3,(H,13,14) Key: DIRFUJHNVNOBMY-UHFFFAOYAY
- SMILES: CNC(=O)Oc1ccccc1C(C)CC

Properties
Chemical formula	C_{12}H_{17}NO_{2}
Molar mass	207.273 g·mol^{−1}
Appearance	Pale yellow or pale red liquid
Solubility in water	insoluble
- Except where otherwise noted, data are given for materials in their standard state (at 25 °C [77 °F], 100 kPa). verify (what is ?) Infobox references

Fenobucarb is a carbamate insecticide, also widely known as BPMC. A pale yellow or pale red liquid, insoluble in water; used as an agricultural insecticide, especially for control of Hemipteran pests, on rice and cotton and moderately toxic for humans.

== Synonyms ==
2-(1-methylpropyl)phenol methylcarbamate; 2-(1-methylpropyl)phenyl methylcarbamate; 2-sec-Butylphenyl N-methylcarbamate; BPMC; fenocarb; N-methyl o-sec-butylphenyl carbamate

== Tradenames ==
Fenobucarb, Osbac, Bassa, Bipvin, Baycarb, etc

== LD50 ==
- Male Mouse 340 mg/kg
- Male Rat 410 mg/kg
