= Butyl isocyanate =

- Skeletal formula of Butyl isocyanate

Names
- IUPAC name 1-isocyanatobutane
- Other names: 1-butyl isocyanate; n-butyl isocyanate; BIC

Identifiers
CAS Number	111-36-4
3D model (JSmol)	Interactive image
ChEBI	CHEBI:136519
ChemSpider	7819
ECHA InfoCard	100.003.512
EC Number	203-862-8
Gmelin Reference	662892
PubChem CID	8110
UNII	XM89T89J3W
CompTox Dashboard (EPA)	DTXSID6026872
- InChI: InChI=1S/C5H9NO/c1-2-3-4-6-5-7/h2-4H2,1H3 Key: HNHVTXYLRVGMHD-UHFFFAOYSA-N
- SMILES: CCCCN=C=O

Properties
Chemical formula	C_{5}H_{9}NO
Molar mass	99.133 g·mol^{−1}
Appearance	colourless liquid with a pungent odor
Density	0.89 g/cm^{3}
Melting point	−75 °C (−103 °F; 198 K)
Boiling point	115 °C (239 °F; 388 K)
Solubility in water	decomposes in water

Hazards
- GHS labelling
Pictograms	(GHS02: Flammable) (GHS05: Corrosive) (GHS06: Toxic) (GHS08: Health hazard)
Signal word	Danger
Hazard statements	H224, H225, H302, H311, H314, H317, H330, H334, H335
Precautionary statements	P210, P233, P240, P241, P242, P243, P260, P262, P264, P264+P265, P270, P271, P272, P280, P284, P301+P317, P301+P330+P331, P302+P352, P302+P361+P354, P303+P361+P353, P304+P340, P305+P354+P338, P316, P317, P319, P320, P321, P330, P333+P317, P342+P316, P361+P364, P362+P364, P363, P370+P378, P403, P403+P233, P403+P235, P405, P501
NFPA 704 (fire diamond)	3 3 2

Related compounds
Related compounds	Methyl isocyanate; Ethyl isocyanate; Propyl isocyanate; Pentyl isocyanate; Hexyl isocyanate; Heptyl isocyanate
- Except where otherwise noted, data are given for materials in their standard state (at 25 °C [77 °F], 100 kPa). Infobox references

Butyl isocyanate is an organic chemical compound of carbon, hydrogen, nitrogen, and oxygen with the linear formula CH_{3}(CH_{2})_{3}NCO. This is the butyl ester of isocyanic acid.

== Synthesis ==
Butyl isocyanate is usually produced by the reaction between n-butylamine and phosgene.

== Physical properties ==
Butyl isocyanate is a highly reactive chemical compound. Like isocyanic acid and other isocyanates, it is highly toxic. Butyl isocyanate polymerizes upon heating.

The compound forms colourless, tear-inducing liquid with a pungent odor.

== Chemical properties ==
Propyl isocyanate decomposes in water, alcohols, and acids. Also decomposes on burning. Butyl isocyanate can be anionically polymerized into poly(butyl isocyanate) when lanthanum isopropoxide is used as the initiator.

== Uses ==
The compound is used in production of other chemicals.
