= Oxamyl =

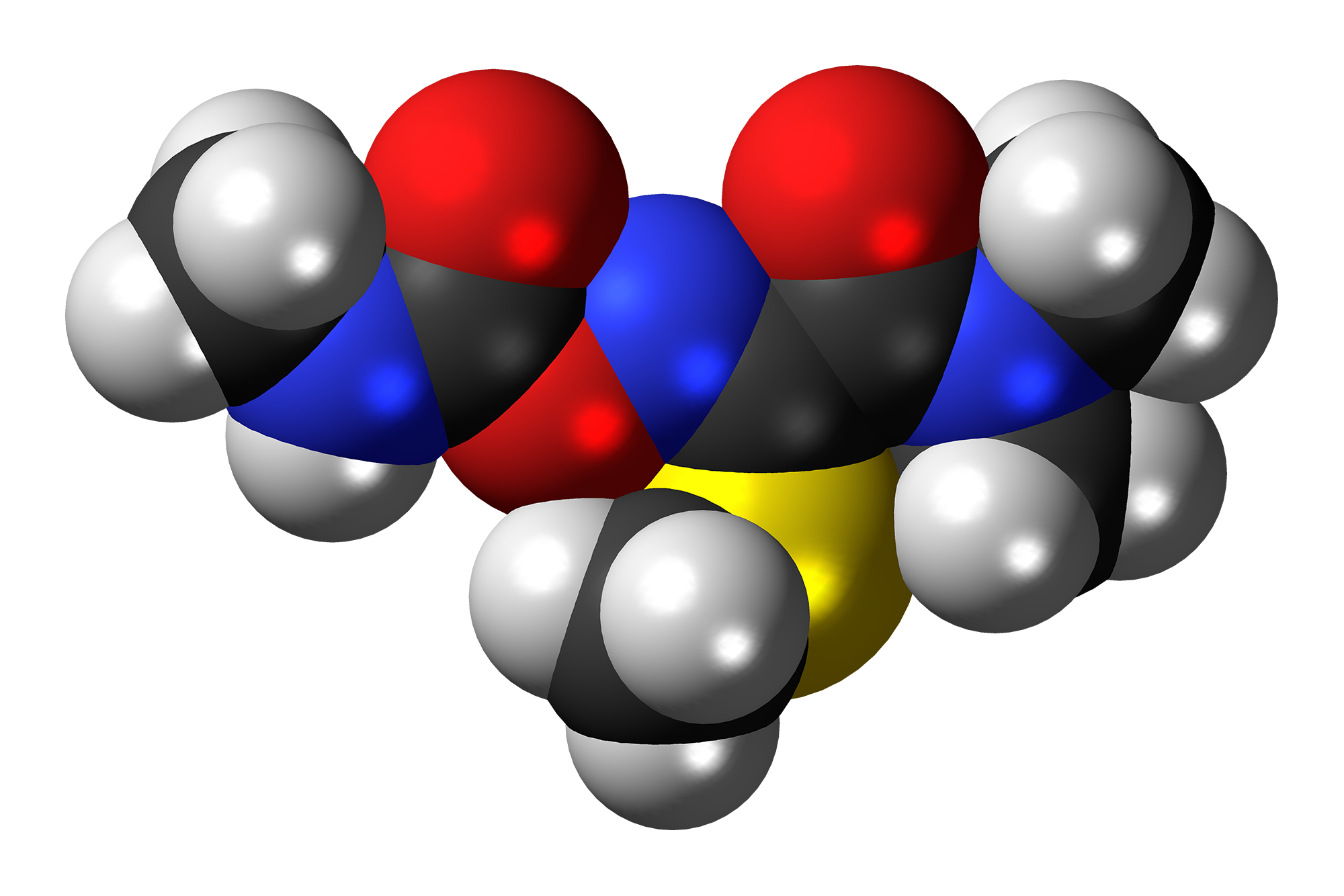

Names
- IUPAC name Methyl 2-(dimethylamino)-N-[(methylcarbamoyl)oxy]-2-oxoethanimidothioate
- Other names N,N-Dimethyl-2-methyl-carbamoyloximino-2-(dimethylthio) acetamide; Thioxamyl

Identifiers
CAS Number	23135-22-0
3D model (JSmol)	Interactive image
ChEMBL	ChEMBL2140710
ChemSpider	29356
ECHA InfoCard	100.041.299
PubChem CID	31657
UNII	SWV4D62X9E
CompTox Dashboard (EPA)	DTXSID6021086
- InChI: InChI=1S/C7H13N3O3S/c1-8-7(12)13-9-5(14-4)6(11)10(2)3/h1-4H3,(H,8,12) Key: KZAUOCCYDRDERY-UHFFFAOYSA-N; InChI=1/C7H13N3O3S/c1-8-7(12)13-9-5(14-4)6(11)10(2)3/h1-4H3,(H,8,12) Key: KZAUOCCYDRDERY-UHFFFAOYAQ
- SMILES: CN(C)C(=O)/C(SC)=N/OC(=O)NC

Properties
Chemical formula	C_{7}H_{13}N_{3}O_{3}S
Molar mass	219.26 g·mol^{−1}
Appearance	Colorless crystalline solid
Density	0.97 g/cm^{3}
Melting point	100 to 102 °C (212 to 216 °F; 373 to 375 K); 108 to 110 °C (dimorphic)
- Except where otherwise noted, data are given for materials in their standard state (at 25 °C [77 °F], 100 kPa). Infobox references

Oxamyl is a chemical used as a pesticide that comes in two forms: granulated and liquid. The granulated form has been banned in the United States. It is commonly sold under the trade name Vydate.

It is classified as an extremely hazardous substance in the United States as defined in Section 302 of the U.S. Emergency Planning and Community Right-to-Know Act (42 U.S.C. 11002), and is subject to strict reporting requirements by facilities which produce, store, or use it in significant quantities.

== Structure and uses ==
Oxamyl is a carbamate pesticide. According to the WHO Food and Agriculture Organization, "Oxamyl is a colourless crystalline solid with a melting point of 100-102 °C changing to a dimorphic form with a melting point of 108-110 °C. It has a slightly sulfurous odour. Oxamyl is non-corrosive. It has a specific gravity of 0.97 (25°/4°)."

According to the United Nations Environment Programme, "This product is efficient in controlling most nematode species in addition to a large number of sucking and chewing insects such as aphids and thrips." Oxamyl is extremely toxic to humans whether ingested, inhaled, or contact with the skin. Its overuse can also lead to residue accumulation in food, though its chemical composition—once coming into contact with the soil—rapidly degrades. Signs of Oxamyl poisoning include: Malaise, muscle weakness, dizziness, sweating, Headache, salivation, nausea, vomiting, abdominal pain, Miosis with blurred vision, incoordination, muscle twitching and slurred speech—though symptoms can worsen with severe poisoning. According to the Food and Agriculture Organization, "Contact with the skin, inhalation of dust or spray, or swallowing may be fatal."

Because of its toxicity, its use is restricted in the EU with maximum residue limits for apples and oranges being 0.001 mg/kg since 2024. This is after a 2023 review by the European Food Safety Authority identified areas of concern and chronic consumer exposure concerns.
