= Ammonium carbamate =

Names
- IUPAC name Ammonium carbamate
- Other names hartshorn, sal volatile, ammonium amidocarbonate, ammonium aminoformate,

Identifiers
CAS Number	1111-78-0
3D model (JSmol)	Interactive image
ChemSpider	451267
ECHA InfoCard	100.012.896
EC Number	214-185-2
Gmelin Reference	14637 (G)
PubChem CID	517232
RTECS number	EY8575000
UNII	I2W9615SWP
UN number	9083
CompTox Dashboard (EPA)	DTXSID9027360
- InChI: InChI=1S/CH3NO2.H3N/c2-1(3)4;/h2H2,(H,3,4);1H3
- SMILES: [O-]C(=O)N.[NH4+]

Properties
Chemical formula	[NH_{4}]NH_{2}CO_{2}
Molar mass	78.071 g·mol^{−1}
Appearance	Colorless, rhombic crystals
Density	1.38 g/cm3 (20 °C)
Melting point	60 °C (140 °F; 333 K) decomposes
Solubility in water	Freely soluble in water
Solubility	Soluble in ethanol, methanol, liquid ammonia, formamide
log P	−0.47 in octanol/water
Vapor pressure	492 mmHg(51 °C)

Thermochemistry
Std enthalpy of formation (Δ_{f}H^{⦵}_{298})	−642.5 kJ/mol

Hazards
- Occupational safety and health (OHS/OSH)
Main hazards	Harmful if ingested, harmful to aquatic life, harmful if inhaled, respiatory tract irritation, skin irritation, eye irritation
- GHS labelling
Pictograms	(GHS07: Exclamation mark)
Signal word	Warning
NFPA 704 (fire diamond)	1 0 0
Flash point	105.6 °C (222.1 °F; 378.8 K)
- Lethal dose or concentration (LD, LC)
LD_{50} (median dose)	1,470 mg/kg in a rat
Safety data sheet (SDS)	External MSDS
- Except where otherwise noted, data are given for materials in their standard state (at 25 °C [77 °F], 100 kPa). Infobox references

Ammonium carbamate is a chemical compound with the formula [NH_{4}][H_{2}NCO_{2}] consisting of ammonium cation NH^{+}_{4} and carbamate anion NH_{2}COO^{−}. It is a white solid that is extremely soluble in water, less so in alcohol. Ammonium carbamate can be formed by the reaction of ammonia NH_{3} with carbon dioxide CO_{2}, and will slowly decompose to those gases at ordinary temperatures and pressures. It is an intermediate in the industrial synthesis of urea (NH_{2})_{2}CO, an important fertilizer.

== Properties ==
=== Solid-gas equilibrium ===
In a closed container solid ammonium carbamate is in equilibrium with carbon dioxide and ammonia

[NH_{4}][NH_{2}CO_{2}] ⇌ 2 NH_{3} + CO_{2}

Lower temperatures shift the equilibrium towards the carbamate.

At higher temperatures ammonium carbamate condenses into urea:

[NH_{4}][NH_{2}CO_{2}] → (NH_{2})_{2}CO + H_{2}O

This reaction was first discovered in 1870 by Bassarov, by heating ammonium carbamate in sealed glass tubes at temperatures ranging from 130 to 140 °C.

=== Equilibrium in water ===
At ordinary temperatures and pressures, ammonium carbamate exists in aqueous solutions as an equilibrium with ammonia and carbon dioxide, and the anions bicarbonate, HCO^{−}_{3}, and carbonate, CO^{2−}_{3}. Indeed, solutions of ammonium carbonate or bicarbonate will contain some carbamate anions too.

H_{2}NCO^{−}_{2} + 2H_{2}O ⇌ NH^{+}_{4} + HCO^{−}_{3} + OH^{−}
H_{2}NCO^{−}_{2} + H_{2}O ⇌ NH^{+}_{4} + CO^{2−}_{3}

=== Structure ===
The structure of solid ammonium carbamate has been confirmed by X-ray crystallography. The oxygen centers form hydrogen bonds to the ammonium cation. There are two polymorphs, α and β, both in the orthorhombic crystal system but differing in their space group. The α polymorph is in space group Pbca (no. 61), whereas the β polymorph is in Ibam (no. 72). The α polymorph is more volatile.

== Preparation ==
=== From liquid ammonia and dry ice ===
Ammonium carbamate is prepared by the direct reaction between liquid ammonia and dry ice (solid carbon dioxide):

2 NH_{3} + CO_{2} → [NH_{2}CO_{2}][NH_{4}]

=== From gaseous ammonia and carbon dioxide ===
Ammonium carbamate can be prepared by reaction of the two gases at high temperature (175–225 °C) and high pressure (150–250 bar).

It can also be obtained by bubbling gaseous CO_{2} and NH_{3} in anhydrous ethanol, 1-propanol, or DMF at ambient pressure and 0 °C. The carbamate precipitates and can be separated by simple filtration, and the liquid containing the unreacted ammonia can be returned to the reactor. The absence of water prevents the formation of bicarbonate and carbonate, and no ammonia is lost.

== Uses ==
=== Urea synthesis ===
Ammonium carbamate is an intermediate in the industrial production of urea. A typical industrial plant that makes urea can produce up to 4000 tons a day. in this reactor and can then be dehydrated to urea according to the following equation:

[NH_{2}CO_{2}][NH_{4}] → (NH_{2})_{2}CO + H_{2}O

=== Pesticide formulations ===
Ammonium carbamate is an inert ingredient in some formulations of the pesticide aluminium phosphide (AlP). Ammonium carbamate make the phosphine less flammable released by AlP by freeing ammonia and carbon dioxide to dilute the phosphine.

=== Laboratory ===
Ammonium carbamate can be used as a ammoniating agent. It has been used to preparation substituted β-amino-α,β-unsaturated esters.

Ammonium carbamate reacts with potassium chloride KCl in liquid ammonia to give potassium carbamate NH_{2}CO^{−}_{2}K^{+}. Carbamates of other metals, such as calcium, can be produced similarly in anhydrous solvents such as methanol, ethanol, or formamide, even at room temperature.
