= Carbamoyl chloride =

Functional group

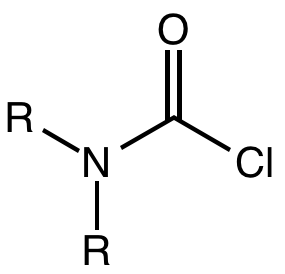

A carbamoyl chloride is the functional group with the formula R_{2}NC(O)Cl. The parent carbamoyl chloride, H_{2}NCOCl, is unstable, but many N-substituted analogues are known. Most examples are moisture sensitive, colourless, and soluble in nonpolar organic solvents. An example is dimethylcarbamoyl chloride (m.p. −90 °C and b.p. 93 °C). Carbamoyl chlorides are used to prepare a number of pesticides, e.g. carbofuran and aldicarb.

== Production and examples ==
Carbamoyl chlorides are prepared by the reaction of an amine with phosgene:

2 R_{2}NH + COCl_{2} → R_{2}NCOCl + [R_{2}NH_{2}]Cl

They also arise by the addition of hydrogen chloride to isocyanates:

RNCO + HCl → RNHCOCl

In this way, carbamoyl chlorides can be prepared with N-H functionality.

== Reactions ==
In a reaction that is typically avoided, hydrolysis of carbamoyl chlorides gives carbamic acids:

R_{2}NCOCl + H_{2}O → R_{2}NC(O)OH + HCl

Owing to the influence of the amino group, these compounds are less hydrolytically sensitive than the usual acid chlorides. A related but more useful reaction is the analogous reaction with alcohols:

R_{2}NCOCl + R'OH + C_{5}H_{5}N → R_{2}NC(O)OR' + C_{5}H_{5}NHCl
