= Hexylamine =

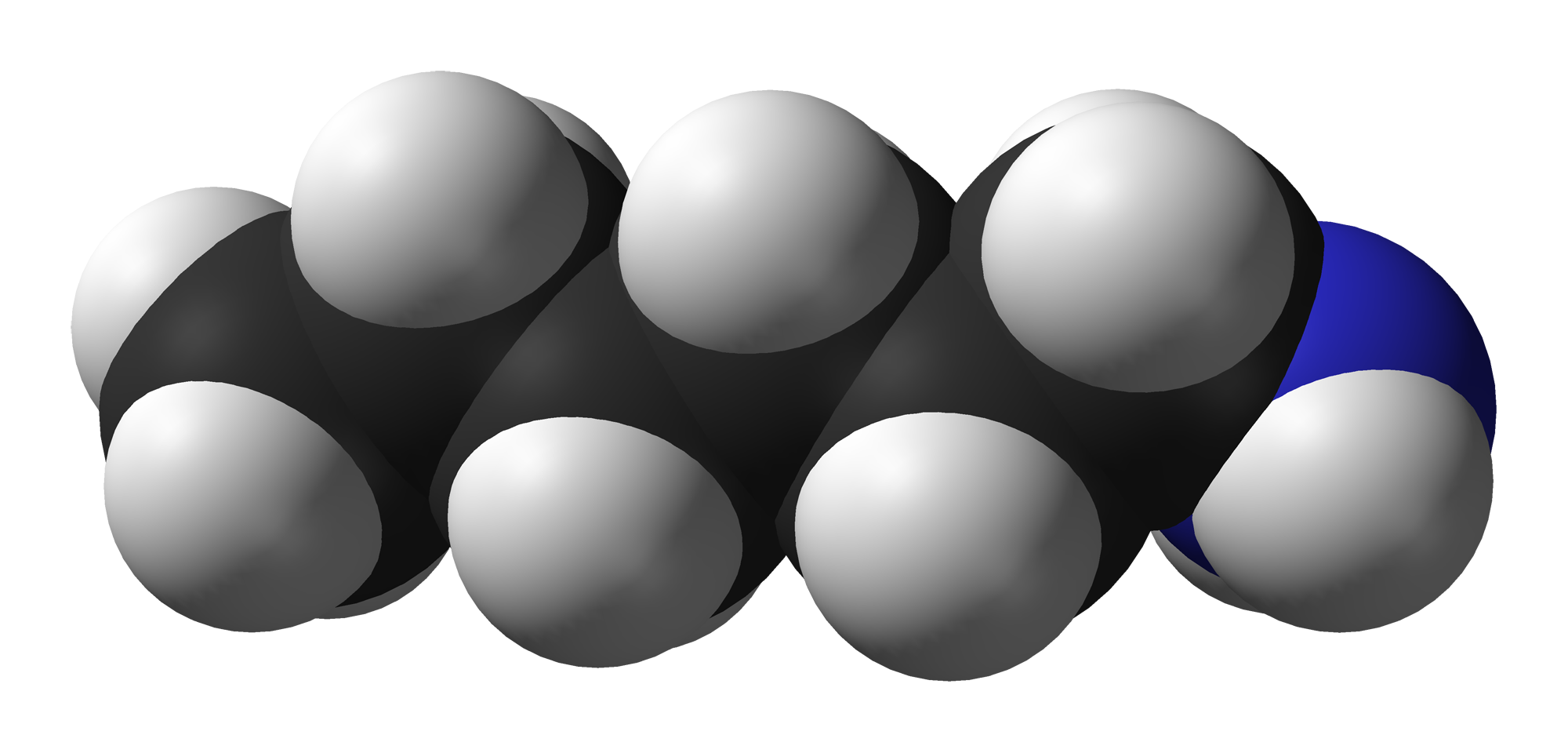

Names
- Preferred IUPAC name Hexan-1-amine
- Other names Hexylamine

Identifiers
CAS Number	111-26-2
3D model (JSmol)	Interactive image
Abbreviations	HxNH_{2} n-HxNH_{2} nHxNH_{2}^{n}HxNH_{2}
ChemSpider	7811
ECHA InfoCard	100.003.502
PubChem CID	8102
UNII	CI4E002ZV8
CompTox Dashboard (EPA)	DTXSID3021930
- InChI: InChI=1S/C6H15N/c1-2-3-4-5-6-7/h2-7H2,1H3 Key: BMVXCPBXGZKUPN-UHFFFAOYSA-N; InChI=1/C6H15N/c1-2-3-4-5-6-7/h2-7H2,1H3 Key: BMVXCPBXGZKUPN-UHFFFAOYAQ
- SMILES: CCCCCCN

Properties
Chemical formula	C_{6}H_{15}N
Molar mass	101.193 g·mol^{−1}
Appearance	Colorless liquid
Odor	"Fishy", similar to bleach/ammonia
Density	0.77 g/cm^{3}
Melting point	−23.4 °C (−10.1 °F; 249.8 K)
Boiling point	131.5 °C (268.7 °F; 404.6 K)
Solubility in water	12 g/L (20 °C)
Solubility	Methanol, dichloromethane, acetone, ethanol

Hazards
- Occupational safety and health (OHS/OSH)
Main hazards	Corrosive, irritant, sensitizer, mildly toxic
- GHS labelling
Pictograms	(GHS02: Flammable) (GHS05: Corrosive) (GHS06: Toxic) (GHS07: Exclamation mark) (GHS09: Environmental hazard)
Signal word	Danger
Hazard statements	H226, H301, H301+H311, H302, H311, H312, H314, H411, H412
Precautionary statements	P210, P233, P240, P241, P242, P243, P260, P262, P264, P264+P265, P270, P273, P280, P301+P316, P301+P317, P301+P330+P331, P302+P352, P302+P361+P354, P303+P361+P353, P304+P340, P305+P354+P338, P316, P317, P321, P330, P361+P364, P362+P364, P363, P370+P378, P391, P403+P235, P405, P501
NFPA 704 (fire diamond)	2 3 0
Flash point	27 °C (81 °F; 300 K)
Safety data sheet (SDS)	MSDS
- Except where otherwise noted, data are given for materials in their standard state (at 25 °C [77 °F], 100 kPa). Infobox references

Hexylamine or n-hexylamine is a chemical compound with the formula C_{6}H_{15}N or CH_{3}(CH_{2})_{5}NH_{2}. This colorless liquid is one of the isomeric amines of hexane. At standard temperature and pressure, it has the ammonia/bleach odor common to amines and is soluble in almost all organic solvents.

== Applications ==
Hexylamine is primarily of interest in surfactants, pesticides, corrosion inhibitors, dyes, rubber, emulsifiers, and pharmaceuticals.
