= Carbamate =

Chemical group (>N–C(=O)–O–)

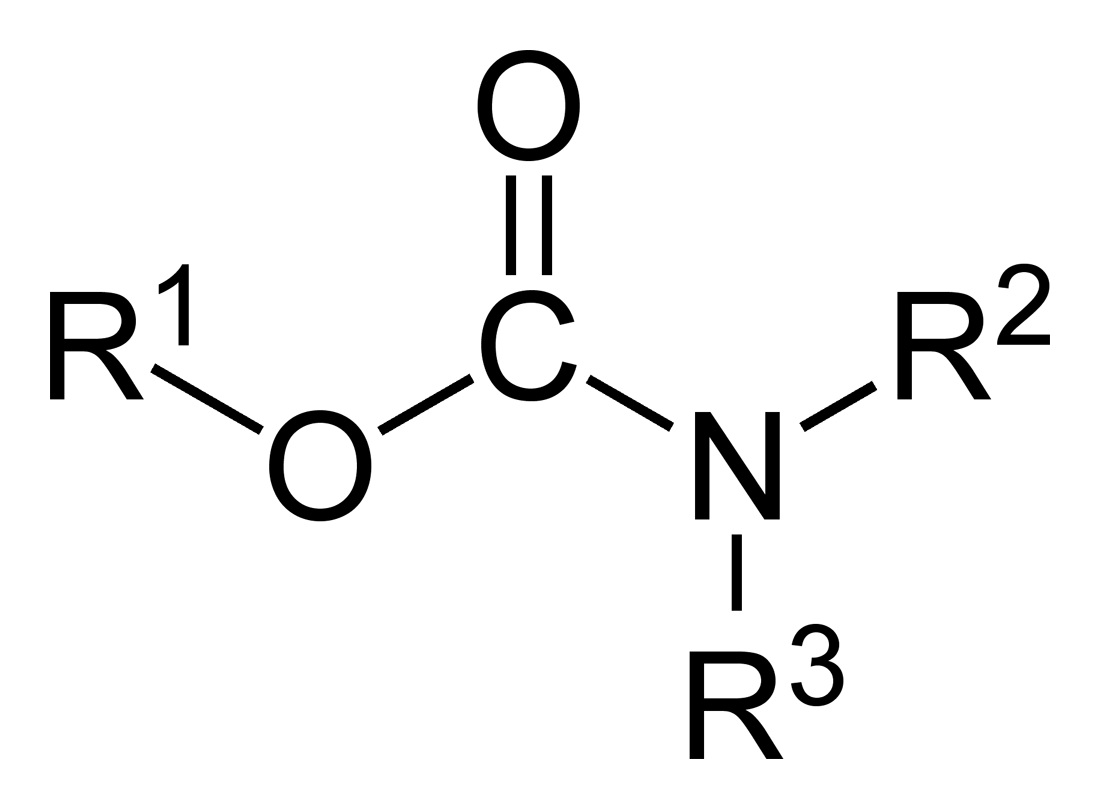
Chemical structure of carbamates

In organic chemistry, a carbamate is a category of organic compounds with the general formula R_{2}NC(O)OR and structure >N−C(=O)−O−, formally derived from carbamic acid (NH_{2}COOH), as well as their organic derivatives, esters such as ethyl carbamate and chlorphenisin carbamate, obtained by replacing one or more of the molecule's hydrogen atoms by other organic functional groups; as well as salts with the carbamate anion H_{2}NCOO^{−} (e.g. ammonium carbamate).

Polymers whose repeat units are joined by carbamate like groups −NH−C(=O)−O− are an important family of plastics, the polyurethanes.

== Properties ==
Unlike carbamic acids, many carbamate esters and salts are stable.

=== Equilibrium with carbonate and bicarbonate ===
In water solutions, the carbamate anion slowly equilibrates with the ammonium NH^{+}_{4} cation and the carbonate CO^{2−}_{3} or bicarbonate HCO^{−}_{3} anions:

H_{2}NCO^{−}_{2} + 2 H_{2}O ⇌ NH^{+}_{4} + HCO^{−}_{3} + OH^{−}
H_{2}NCO^{−}_{2} + H_{2}O ⇌ NH^{+}_{4} + CO^{2−}_{3}

Calcium carbamate is soluble in water, whereas calcium carbonate is not. Adding a calcium salt to an ammonium carbamate/carbonate solution will precipitate some calcium carbonate immediately, and then slowly precipitate more as the carbamate hydrolyzes.

== Synthesis ==
=== Carbamate salts ===
Ammonium carbamate is generated by treatment of ammonia with carbon dioxide:

2 NH_{3} + CO_{2} → NH_{4}[H_{2}NCO_{2}]

The ammonium carbamate is produced on a large scale as an intermediate in the production of the commodity chemical urea from ammonia and carbon dioxide.

=== Carbamate esters ===
Carbamate esters also arise via alcoholysis of carbamoyl chlorides:

R_{2}NC(O)Cl + R'OH → R_{2}NCO_{2}R' + HCl

Alternatively, carbamates can be formed from chloroformates and amines:

R'OC(O)Cl + R_{2}NH → R_{2}NCO_{2}R' + HCl

Carbamates may be formed from the Curtius rearrangement, where isocyanates formed are reacted with an alcohol.

RCON_{3} → RNCO + N_{2}
RNCO + R′OH → RNHCO_{2}R′

== Natural occurrence ==
=== Carbamylated proteins ===
Within nature carbon dioxide can bind with neutral amine groups to form a carbamate. This post-translational modification is known as carbamylation, and is known to occur on several important proteins.

The N-terminal amino groups of valine residues in the α- and β-chains of deoxyhemoglobin exist as carbamates. They help to stabilise the protein when it becomes deoxyhemoglobin, and increases the likelihood of the release of remaining oxygen molecules bound to the protein. This stabilizing effect should not be confused with the Bohr effect (an indirect effect caused by carbon dioxide).

The ε-amino groups of the lysine residues in urease and phosphotriesterase also feature carbamate.

=== CO_{2} capture by ribulose 1,5-bisphosphate carboxylase ===
Perhaps the most prevalent carbamate is the one involved in the capture of CO_{2} by plants, a process necessary for their growth. The enzyme ribulose 1,5-bisphosphate carboxylase/oxygenase (RuBisCO) fixes a molecule of carbon dioxide as phosphoglycerate in the Calvin cycle. At the active site of the enzyme, a Mg^{2+} ion is bound to glutamate and aspartate residues as well as a lysine carbamate. The carbamate is formed when an uncharged lysine side chain near the ion reacts with a carbon dioxide molecule from the air which then renders it charged, and, therefore, able to bind the Mg^{2+} ion.

Carbamate formation is a critical step in the formation of biomass from atmospheric carbon dioxide.

=== Other biosynthetic pathways ===
Carbamoyl phosphate is a carbamate mixed anhydride that is an intermediate in the urea cycle and the biosynthesis of pyrimidines. 5-carboxyamino-1-(5-phospho-D-ribosyl)imidazole (N^{5}-CAIR), a carbamate derivative of aminoimidazole, is an intermediate in the biosynthesis of inosine. Both carbamates are produced via reaction of −NH_{2} groups with carboxyphosphate (HO−C(O)−OPO^{2−}_{3}).

== Applications ==
=== Polyurethane plastics ===
Polyurethanes contain multiple "urethane" carbamate groups as part of their structure, and are usually formed by reaction of an alcohol with an isocyanate. Commonly, urethanes made by a non-isocyanate route are called carbamates.

Polyurethane polymers have a wide range of properties and are commercially available as foams, elastomers, and solids. Typically, polyurethane polymers are made by combining diisocyanates, e.g. toluene diisocyanate, and diols, where the carbamate groups are formed by reaction of the alcohols with the isocyanates:

RN=C=O + R′OH → RNHC(O)OR′

=== Carbamate insecticides ===
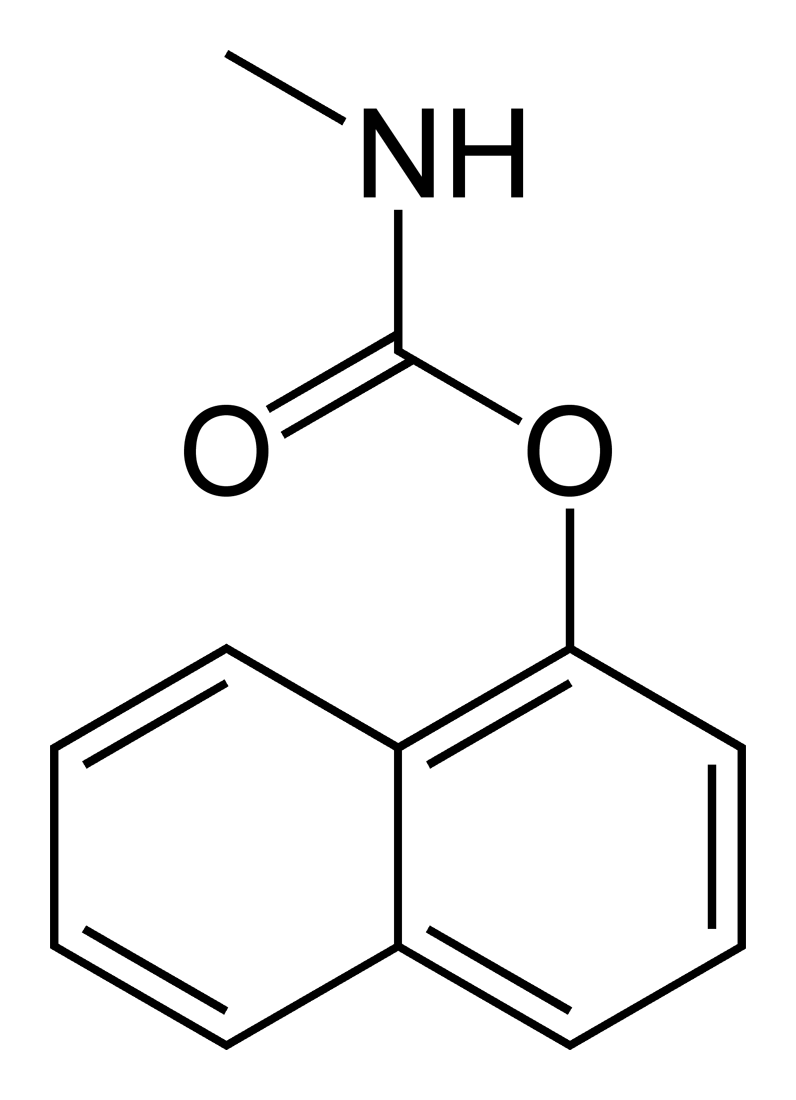
The carbamate insecticide Carbaryl.

The so-called carbamate insecticides feature the carbamate ester functional group (ROC(O)NHR'). Included in this group are aldicarb (Temik), carbofuran (Furadan), carbaryl (Sevin), ethienocarb, fenobucarb, oxamyl, and methomyl. They are synthetic analogues of the toxic alkaloid physostigmine, the study of which led to this class of insecticides. An estimated 25M kg of carbaryl were produced in 1971. These insecticides kill insects by reversibly inactivating the enzyme acetylcholinesterase (AChE inhibition) (IRAC mode of action 1a).

Fenoxycarb has a carbamate group but acts as a juvenile hormone mimic, rather than inactivating acetylcholinesterase. The insect repellent icaridin is a substituted carbamate.

Besides their common use as arthropodocides/insecticides, they are also nematicidal, with one such example being Oxamyl. The journal, Pesticide Biochemistry and Physiology reported in 2020 that sales have declined dramatically over recent decades.

==== Resistance ====
Among insecticide resistance mutations in esterases, carbamate resistance most commonly involves acetylcholinesterase (AChE) desensitization, while organophosphate resistance most commonly is carboxylesterase metabolization.

=== Carbamate nerve agents ===
While the carbamate acetylcholinesterase inhibitors are commonly referred to as "carbamate insecticides" due to their generally high selectivity for insect acetylcholinesterase enzymes over the mammalian versions, the most potent compounds such as aldicarb and carbofuran are still capable of inhibiting mammalian acetylcholinesterase enzymes at low enough concentrations that they pose a significant risk of poisoning to humans, especially when used in large amounts for agricultural applications. Other carbamate based acetylcholinesterase inhibitors are known with even higher toxicity to humans, and some such as T-1123 and EA-3990 were investigated for potential military use as nerve agents. However, since all compounds of this type have a quaternary ammonium group with a permanent positive charge, they have poor blood–brain barrier penetration, and also are only stable as crystalline salts or aqueous solutions, and so were not considered to have suitable properties for weaponisation.

=== Preservatives ===
Iodopropynyl butylcarbamate is a wood and paint preservative, and also used in cosmetics. Chlorphenisin is an antifungal agent used medicinally as well as among cosmetics and foods, while its ester, chlorphenisin carbamate has skeletal muscle relaxant properties.

=== Chemical research ===
Some of the most common amine protecting groups, such as Boc, Fmoc, benzyl chloroformate and trichloroethyl chloroformate are carbamates.

=== Medicinal uses ===
==== Ethyl carbamate ====
Urethane, or ethyl carbamate, was once used in the United States as a chemotherapy agent and for other medicinal purposes but was later found to be toxic and relatively ineffective. As of 2013, it is occasionally used in veterinary medicine in combination with other drugs to produce anesthesia.

==== Carbamate derivatives ====
Several carbamate derivatives have seen use in human pharmacotherapy.

The acetylcholinesterase inhibitor chemical class includes neostigmine and rivastigmine, both of which have a chemical structure based on the natural alkaloid physostigmine.

in 1955, the United States Food and Drug Administration approved ethinamate as a prescription nonbarbiturate soporific under the trade name Valmid followed by meprobamate, marketed primarily as Miltown quickly became ubiquitous as a prescription nerve pill, minor tranquilizer or daytime anxiolytic and myorelaxant, and sedative-hypnotic. Meprobamate is almost entirely discontinued globally in 2026, carisoprodol) is a CNS depressant and a prodrug of meprobamate; initially acting primarily as a muscle relaxant and muscle pain reliever; after 2-3 hours, 20-30% of initial dose converts into active metabolite meprobamate, synergistically working together to potentiate or increase the existing sedation and muscle relaxation and analgesia.

- Valmid or Valamin was a carbamate derivative chemically named ethinamate. It was withdrawn from the market in the U.S. and Netherlands around 1990.
- The protease inhibitor darunavir for HIV treatment also contains a carbamate functional group.
- Ephedroxane, an aminorex analogue used as a stimulant, also falls into the carbamate category.
- Felbamate is an anticonvulsant used in the treatment of epilepsy, with high risk of potentially fatal aplastic anemia and/or liver failure limiting the drug's usage to severe refractory epilepsy.

== Toxicity ==
Besides inhibiting human acetylcholinesterase (although to a lesser degree than the insect enzyme), carbamate insecticides also target human melatonin receptors. The human health effects of carbamates are well documented in the list of known endocrine disruptor compounds. Clinical effects of carbamate exposure can vary from slightly toxic to highly toxic depending on a variety of factors including such as dose and route of exposure with ingestion and inhalation resulting in the most rapid clinical effects. These clinical manifestations of carbamate intoxication are muscarinic signs, nicotinic signs, and in rare cases central nervous system signs.

== Sulfur analogues ==
There are two oxygen atoms in a carbamate (1), ROC(=O)NR_{2}, and either or both of them can be conceptually replaced by sulfur. Analogues of carbamates with only one of the oxygens replaced by sulfur are called thiocarbamates (2 and 3). Carbamates with both oxygens replaced by sulfur are called dithiocarbamates (4), RSC(=S)NR_{2}.

There are two different structurally isomeric types of thiocarbamate:

- O-thiocarbamates (2), ROC(=S)NR_{2}, where the carbonyl group (C=O) is replaced with a thiocarbonyl group (C=S)
- S-thiocarbamates (3), RSC(=O)NR_{2}, where the R–O– group is replaced with an R–S– group

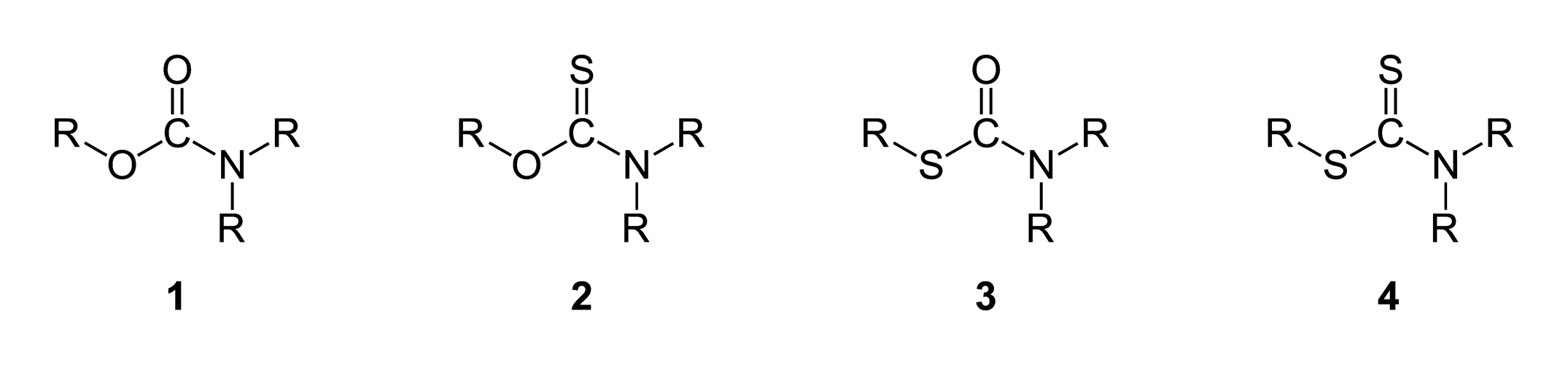
O-thiocarbamates can isomerise to S-thiocarbamates, for example in the Newman–Kwart rearrangement.

== Ester terminology ==
IUPAC states normatively that carbamate "esters are often called urethanes or urethans, a usage that is strictly correct only for the ethyl esters." However, as a descriptive matter, the IUPAC recognizes that "An alternative term for the compounds R_{2}NC(=O)OR' (R' not = H), esters of carbamic acids, R_{2}NC(=O)OH, in strict use limited to the ethyl esters, but widely used in the general sense".

== See also ==
- Methyl carbamate
- Ethyl carbamate
- Polyurethane
- Cholinesterase inhibitor
