= Aldicarb =

Chemical compound (insecticide)

- Skeletal formula of aldicarb

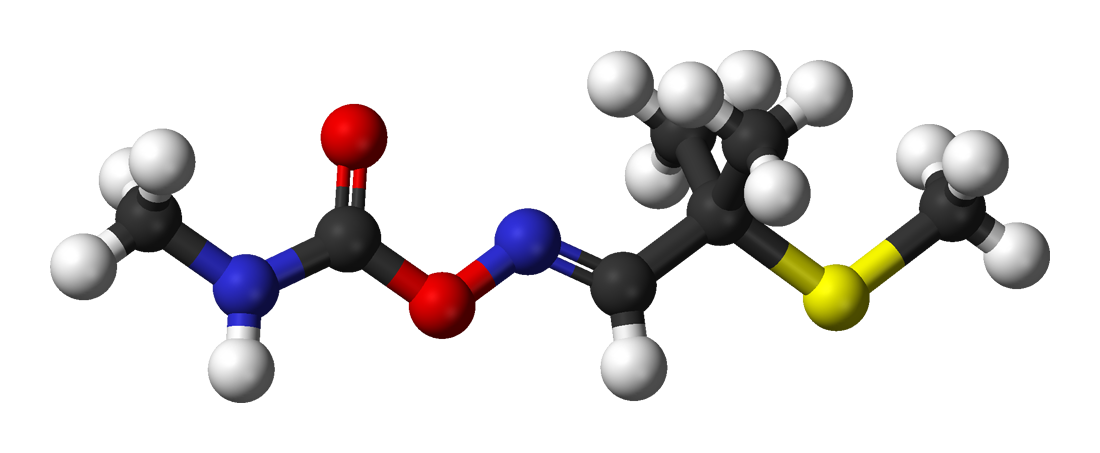
- Ball-and-stick model of aldicarb

Names
- IUPAC name 2-Methyl-2-(methylthio)propanal O-(N-methylcarbamoyl)oxime
- Other names Temik

Identifiers
CAS Number	116-06-3
3D model (JSmol)	Interactive image
ChEMBL	ChEMBL91732
ChemSpider	7844539
ECHA InfoCard	100.003.749
EC Number	204-123-2
KEGG	C11015
PubChem CID	9570071
RTECS number	UE2275000
UNII	8V071SH05P
CompTox Dashboard (EPA)	DTXSID0039223
- InChI: InChI=1S/C7H14N2O2S/c1-7(2,12-4)5-9-11-6(10)8-3/h5H,1-4H3,(H,8,10)/b9-5+ Key: QGLZXHRNAYXIBU-WEVVVXLNSA-N; InChI=1/C7H14N2O2S/c1-7(2,12-4)5-9-11-6(10)8-3/h5H,1-4H3,(H,8,10)/b9-5+ Key: QGLZXHRNAYXIBU-WEVVVXLNBS
- SMILES: CNC(=O)O/N=C/C(C)(C)SC

Properties
Chemical formula	C_{7}H_{14}N_{2}O_{2}S
Molar mass	190.26 g·mol^{−1}
Appearance	colorless crystals
Odor	faint sulfur odor
Density	1.195 g/cm^{2}
Melting point	99.5 °C (211.1 °F; 372.6 K)
Boiling point	251 °C (484 °F; 524 K)
Solubility in water	0.573 g/100 mL
Solubility	soluble in acetone, benzene, chlorobenzene, diethyl ether, isopropyl alcohol, methylene chloride, toluene slightly soluble in xylene

Hazards
- Lethal dose or concentration (LD, LC)
LD_{50} (median dose)	0.84 mg/kg (oral, rats)
- Except where otherwise noted, data are given for materials in their standard state (at 25 °C [77 °F], 100 kPa). verify (what is ?) Infobox references

Aldicarb is a carbamate insecticide which is the active substance in the pesticide Temik. It is effective against thrips, aphids, spider mites, lygus, fleahoppers, and leafminers, but is primarily used as a nematicide. Aldicarb is a cholinesterase inhibitor which prevents the breakdown of acetylcholine in the synapse. Aldicarb is considered "extremely hazardous" by the EPA and World Health Organization and has been banned in more than 100 countries.

In case of severe poisoning, the victim dies of respiratory paralysis.

Aldicarb was first synthesized in 1965 by Payne and Weiden, and was sold on the market for the first time in 1970. The synthesis of aldicarb results in both the E and Z isomers.

Aldicarb is effective where resistance to malathion has developed, and is extremely important in potato production, where it is used for the control of soil-borne nematodes and some foliar pests. Its high level of solubility restricts its use in certain areas where the water table is close to the surface.

== Regulatory status ==
In the United States, aldicarb was approved by the EPA for use by professional pesticide applicators on a variety of crops, including cotton, beans, and others. It is not approved for household use. The EPA started limiting the main aldicarb pesticide, Temik 15G, in 2010, requiring an end to distribution by 2017. Discontinuation of the use on citrus and potatoes began in 2012, with a complete phase out of the product expected by 2018. A new aldicarb pesticide named AgLogic 15G, was approved by the EPA in December 2011 and is said to be entering the market in 2015. It will be registered for use on cotton, dry beans, peanuts, soybeans, sugar beets, and sweet potatoes.

Tres Pasitos, a mouse, rat, and roach killer that contains high concentrations of aldicarb, has been illegally imported into the United States from Mexico and other Latin American countries. The product is highly toxic to animals and people, and according to the EPA "should never be used in [the] home."

Most commonly, aldicarb causes toxic symptoms when it is ingested through food that has been tainted with the insecticide. Once in the body, aldicarb is broken down into aldicarb sulfone and aldicarb sulfoxide. Hydrolysis of aldicarb leads to aldicarb oximes and aldicarb nitriles to reverse the toxicity.

Aldicarb is classified as an extremely hazardous substance in the United States as defined in Section 302 of the U.S. Emergency Planning and Community Right-to-Know Act (42 U.S.C. 11002), and is subject to strict reporting requirements by facilities which produce, store, or use it in significant quantities. The use of aldicarb has been prohibited in Europe since 2003 due to concerns over the impact on non-target organisms.

== History ==
Aldicarb is manufactured by Bayer CropScience, but was formerly owned and produced by Union Carbide. Union Carbide's agricultural chemicals division was sold to Rhône-Poulenc. Later, Aventis Cropscience was formed from Hoechst AG and Rhone-Poulenc Agrochemical, which lasted until Bayer acquired it in 2002.

In August 1979, groundwater wells in Suffolk County, NY were contaminated with aldicarb residue due to irrigated potato fields nearby. Of the approximately 8,400 wells tested, 13.5% contained more than 7 ug/L of aldicarb, which exceeds standard guidelines.

In July 1985, aldicarb present in watermelons grown in California caused an outbreak of pesticide food poisoning which affected over 2,000 people, and led to a temporary ban on watermelon sales.

In November 2009, corn treated with Temik was placed in and around peanut fields in Eastland County, Texas, near the town of Cisco. The corn was eaten by feral hogs, deer, and other animals, prompting the Texas Parks and Wildlife Department to issue a hunting ban.

== Toxicity in mammals ==
Aldicarb is a fast-acting cholinesterase inhibitor, causing rapid accumulation of acetylcholine at the synaptic cleft. The aldicarb structure is similar to that of acetylcholine, therefore improving its binding to acetylcholinesterase in the body. It is widely used to study cholinergic neurotransmission in simple systems such as the nematode C. elegans.

Exposure to high amounts of aldicarb can cause weakness, blurred vision, headache, nausea, tearing, sweating, and tremors in humans. High doses can be fatal to humans because it can paralyze the respiratory system.

In South Africa (where Aldicarb is popularly known as Two Step) it is widely used by burglars to poison dogs.

== Toxicity in birds ==
LD_{50} for a mallard duck is 1.0 mg/kg body weight (acute). According to the Rotterdam Convention's risk assessment, "Ingestion of aldicarb granules poses a great threat to avian species; aldicarb is very toxic to birds and poses a danger to endangered species".
