= List of banned and restricted pesticides in India =

This article provides a comprehensive list of pesticides currently subject to specific regulatory restrictions in India as of 31 March 2024. Restrictions are implemented to protect public health, the environment, and to ensure safer agricultural practices by limiting the use, production, and application of certain pesticides.

== Pesticides banned from manufacture, import, and use ==
Pesticides banned from manufacture, import, and use
No.	Name	Order and date
1	Alachlor	S.O. 3951 (E), dated 8 August 2018
2	Aldicarb	S.O. 682 (E) dated 17 July 2001
3	Aldrin	
4	Benzene hexachloride	
5	Benomyl	S.O. 3951(E) dated 8 August 2018
6	Calcium cyanide	
7	Carbaryl	S.O. 3951(E) dated 8 August 2018
8	Chlorobenzilate	S.O. 682 (E) dated 17 July 2001
9	Chlordane	
10	Chlorfenvinphos	
11	Copper acetoarsenite	
12	Diazinon	S.O. 3951(E) dated 8 August 2018
13	Dibromochloropropane (DBCP)	S.O. 569 (E) dated 25 July 1989
14	Dichlorvos	S.O. 3951 (E), dated 8 August 2018
15	Dicofol	S.O. 4294(E) dated 3 October 2023
16	Dieldrin	S.O. 682 (E) dated 17 July 2001
17	Dinocap	S.O. 4294(E) dated 3 October 2023
18	Endosulfan	ad-Interim order of the Supreme Court of India in the Writ Petition (Civil) No. 213 of 2011 dated 13 May 2011 and finally disposed of dated 10 January 2017
19	Endrin	
20	Ethylmercury chloride	
21	Ethyl parathion	
22	Ethylene dibromide (EDB)	S.O. 682 (E) dated 17 July 2001
23	Fenarimol	S.O 3951(E) dated 8 August 2018
24	Fenthion	S.O 3951(E) dated 8 August 2018
25	Heptachlor	
26	Lindane (Gamma-HCH)	
27	Linuron	S.O 3951(E) dated 8 August 2018
28	Maleic hydrazide	S.O. 682 (E) dated 17 July 2001
29	Menazon	
30	Methomyl	S.O. 4294(E) dated 3 October 2023
31	Methoxyethylmercury chloride	S.O 3951(E) dated 8 August 2018
32	Methyl parathion	S.O 3951(E) dated 8 August 2018
33	Metoxuron	
34	Nitrofen	
35	Paraquat dimethyl sulfate (Gramoxone)	
36	Pentachloronitrobenzene (PCNB)	S.O. 569 (E) dated 25 July 1989
37	Pentachlorophenol	
38	Phenylmercury acetate	
39	Phorate	S.O. 3951 (E), dated 8 August 2018
40	Phosphamidon	S.O. 3951 (E), dated 8 August 2018
41	Sodium cyanide	banned for Insecticidal purpose only S.O 3951(E) dated 8 August 2018); Regulation to be continued in the extant manner for non-insecticidal uses.
42	Sodium methanearsonate	
43	Tetradifon	
44	Thiometon	S.O 3951(E) dated 8 August 2018
45	Toxaphene (Camphechlor)	S.O. 569 (E) dated 25 July 1989
46	Triazophos	S.O. 3951 (E), dated 8 August 2018
47	Tridemorph	S.O 3951(E) dated 8 August 2018
48	Trichloroacetic acid (TCA)	S.O. 682 (E) dated 17 July 2001
49	Trichlorfon	S.O. 3951 (E), dated 8 August 2018

== Pesticides banned for use but manufacture allowed for export ==
Pesticides banned for use but allowed for export
No.	Name	Order and date
1	Captafol 80% Powder	S.O. 679 (E) dated 17 July 2001
2	Dichlorvos	S.O. 1196 (E) dated 20 March 2020
3	Nicotine sulfate	S.O. 325 (E) dated 11 May 1992
4	Phorate	S.O. 1196 (E) dated 20 March 2020
5	Triazophos	S.O. 1196 (E) dated 20 March 2020

== Pesticides withdrawn ==
List of withdrawn pesticides
No.	Name	Order and date
1	Dalapon	
2	Ferbam	
3	Formothion	
4	Nickel chloride	
5	Paradichlorobenzene (PDCB)	
6	Simazine	
7	Sirmate	S.O. 2485 (E) dated 24 September 2014
8	Warfarin	S.O. 915 (E) dated 15 June 2006

== Pesticides refused registration ==
Pesticides refused registration
No.	Name
1	2,4,5-T
2	Ammonium sulphamate
3	Azinphos-ethyl
4	Azinphos-methyl
5	Binapacryl
6	Calcium arsenate
7	Carbophenothion
8	Chinomethionate (Morestan)
9	Dicrotophos
10	EPN
11	Fentin acetate
12	Fentin hydroxide
13	Lead arsenate
14	Leptophos (Phosvel)
15	Mephosfolan
16	Mevinphos (Phosdrin)
17	Disulfoton (Thiodemeton)
18	Vamidothion

== Pesticides restricted for use in the country ==
Pesticides restricted for use in the country
No.	Name	Details of restrictions
1	Aluminium phosphide	Pest control operations allowed only by Govt./Govt. undertakings/approved experts, except 15% 12 g and 6% tablets. Production, marketing, and use of 10- and 20-tablet tube packs banned. (RC circular, G.S.R. 371(E), S.O. 677(E) dated 17 July 2001)
2	Captafol	Foliar spray banned; permitted only as seed dresser. Manufacture of 80% powder banned for domestic use; allowed for export. (S.O. 569(E) dated 25 July 1989; S.O. 679(E) dated 17 July 2001)
3	Carbofuran	All formulations banned except 3% encapsulated granule (CG) with crop labels. (S.O. 4294(E) dated 3 October 2023)
4	Chlorpyrifos	Banned for use in Ber, Citrus, and Tobacco. (S.O. 4294(E) dated 3 October 2023)
5	Cypermethrin	3% smoke generator restricted to use by Pest Control Operators only, not for general public. (Delhi High Court Order, WP(C) 10052 of 2009)
6	Dazomet	Not permitted for use on Tea. (S.O. 3006(E) dated 31 December 2008)
7	Dichloro-diphenyl-trichloroethane (DDT)	Restricted to 10,000 MT per year for public health; export allowed under Stockholm Convention. Banned in agriculture; special permissions for plant protection may be granted by Govt. (S.O. 295(E) dated 8 March 2006; S.O. 378(E) dated 26 May 1989)
8	Dimethoate	Banned for use in fruits and vegetables consumed raw. (S.O. 4294(E) dated 3 October 2023)
9	Fenitrothion	Banned in agriculture except for locust control and public health. (S.O. 706(E) dated 3 May 2007)
10	Malathion	Banned for use on Sorghum, Pea, Soybean, Castor, Sunflower, and specific fruits/vegetables including Apple, Mango, and Grape. (S.O. 4294(E) dated 3 October 2023)
11	Mancozeb	Banned for use on Guava, Jowar, and Tapioca. (S.O. 4294(E) dated 3 October 2023)
12	Methyl bromide	Restricted for use only by Govt./Govt. undertakings or approved experts. (G.S.R. 371(E) dated 20 May 1999)
13	Monocrotophos	Banned for use on vegetables; discontinuation of 36% SL formulation after existing stocks expire. (S.O. 1482(E) dated 10th Oct 2005; S.O. 4294(E) dated 3 October 2023)
14	Oxyfluorfen	Banned for use on Potato and Groundnut. (S.O. 4294(E) dated 3 October 2023)
15	Quinalphos	Banned for use on Jute, Cardamom, and Sorghum. (S.O. 4294(E) dated 3 October 2023)
16	Trifluralin	All uses banned except in wheat from Aug 2018; cautionary statement must be incorporated in the label and leaflet warning it is toxic to aquatic organisms, hence should not be used near water bodies, aquaculture or pisciculture areas. (S.O. 3951(E) dated 8 August 2018)

== Recent proposals ==
The Government of India has proposed further restrictions on the usage of 27 pesticides which are already banned in other countries on 14 May 2020. This decision follows recommendations from an expert committee that reviewed the safety, environmental impact, and international regulatory status of these substances. The proposal seeks to ban the import, manufacture, sale, transport, and use of these pesticides in agriculture, citing risks such as carcinogenicity, endocrine disruption, and toxicity to aquatic organisms and pollinators.

=== Proposed pesticides for restricted use in India ===
Insecticide	Key concerns	Banned countries	Environmental impact	Notable details
Acephate	Endocrine disruption concerns; Incomplete resistance data for rice and cotton	32 countries including EU, China, Malaysia	Toxic to honey bees	Organophosphate compound
Atrazine	Incomplete bio-efficacy data; Endocrine disruption potential	37 countries including EU, UK	Toxic to aquatic organisms	Product leaching concerns
Benfuracarb	Carcinogenic impurities; Reprotoxic effects; Incomplete data submission	28 countries including EU, UK	Ground water contamination risk	Metabolites proven more toxic
Butachlor	Incomplete bio-efficacy studies; Leaching concerns	31 countries including EU, UK	Toxic to aquatic organisms	Alternatives available
Captan	Listed in US-EPA Endocrine Disruptor Screening; Incomplete toxicity data	6 countries including Cambodia, Saudi Arabia	Toxic to aquatic organisms	Incomplete bio-efficacy data
Carbendazim	Foetotoxic and teratogenic; Contains toxic impurities; High fungicide resistance risk	29 countries including EU, UK	Not specified	Endocrine disruption potential
Carbofuran	Extremely toxic (WHO Class Ib); Very low Acceptable Daily Intake	63 countries including EU, UK, Canada	Toxic to honey bees, aquatic organisms, birds	Endocrine disruption concerns
Chlorpyrifos	Neurotoxic; Incomplete toxicity data; Health hazards to children	31 countries including EU	Organophosphate toxicity	Banned except for desert locust control
2,4-D	Carcinogenic dioxin content; Incomplete crop data	3 countries	Not specified	Endocrine disruption concerns
Deltamethrin	Incomplete resistance data; Limited crop data	Not specified	Toxic to honey bees	Banned except for desert locust and public health use
Dicofol	DDT contamination concerns; No current bio-efficacy data	45 countries including EU	Highly toxic to aquatic organisms	Endocrine disruption concerns
Dimethoate	Highly toxic organophosphorus; Toxic metabolites	31 countries including EU	Not specified	Genotoxicity concerns
Dinocap	No current bio-efficacy data; Teratogenic concerns	28 countries including EU, UK	Toxic to aquatic organisms	Limited data availability
Diuron	Endocrine disruption concerns; Incomplete crop data	Banned in Mozambique	Toxic to aquatic organisms	TCAB contamination concerns
Malathion	Incomplete bio-efficacy data; Limited crop studies	2 countries	Ecotoxic	Allowed for desert locust and public health
Mancozeb	ETU toxicity concerns; Incomplete thyroid profile data	Banned in Saudi Arabia	Toxic to aquatic organisms	Limited crop data
Methomyl	Extremely toxic (WHO Class Ib); Limited toxicity data	41 countries including EU	Toxic to honey bees, silkworms, birds, aquatic organisms	Very low ADI
Monocrotophos	Extremely toxic (WHO Class Ib); Poisoning risks	112 countries including EU, UK, China	Toxic to honey bees, aquatic organisms, birds	Very low ADI
Oxyfluorfen	Possible human carcinogen; Blood parameter effects	2 countries	Toxic to aquatic organisms	Affects terrestrial plants
Pendimethalin	Incomplete toxicity data; Thyroid concerns	2 countries	Highly toxic to aquatic organisms	Limited aquatic studies
Quinalphos	High acute mammalian toxicity; Incomplete neurotoxicity data	30 countries including EU, UK	Highly toxic to aquatic organisms	Organophosphorus compound
Sulfosulfuron	Resistance development; Limited effectiveness	Banned in Norway	Not specified	Resistance in target weeds
Thiodicarb	High mammalian toxicity; Incomplete studies	Banned in EU, UK	Toxic to honey bees and aquatic organisms	Methomyl metabolite concerns
Thiophanate-methyl	High fungicide resistance risk; Incomplete thyroid studies	Not specified	Toxic to earthworms	Related to banned Benomyl
Thiram	Toxic metabolites; Endocrine disruption	28 countries including EU	Toxic to aquatic organisms, Risk to birds	ETU toxicity concerns
Zineb	Endocrine disruption; ETU toxicity concerns	32 countries including EU	Toxic to aquatic organisms	Limited data submission
Ziram	Endocrine disruption; ETU toxicity concerns	EPA Inactive	Toxic to aquatic organisms	Incomplete bio-efficacy data
