= Dangerous Substances Act =

Dangerous Substances Act is an act for a chemical registry in Thailand and stipulates that the sale of any pesticides require registration. The latest revision came into force in August 2011.

== Reception ==
Due to non-registration of 4 carcinogenic chemicals used on crops, vegetables with residues of methomyl, carbofuran, dicrotophos, and EPN were taken off supermarket shelves in July 2012. Furthermore, with an absence of local standards, in a local test of 7 supermarket vegetables sent to laboratories, European Union standards regarding pesticides were used, with coriander and chili in particular exceeding standards by a wide margin. Thailand mangoes are also subject to methomyl contamination, a banned substance in all developed nations, nevertheless includes exported mangoes to developed countries.

BioThai Foundation, a leading chemical firm, is pushing to have these chemicals listed on the registry, despite developed countries banning them, yet consumer groups in Thailand such as Foundation for Consumers is asking the Agriculture and Cooperative Ministry for a ban.
