= Carbofuran =

Toxic carbamate pesticide

Carbofuran
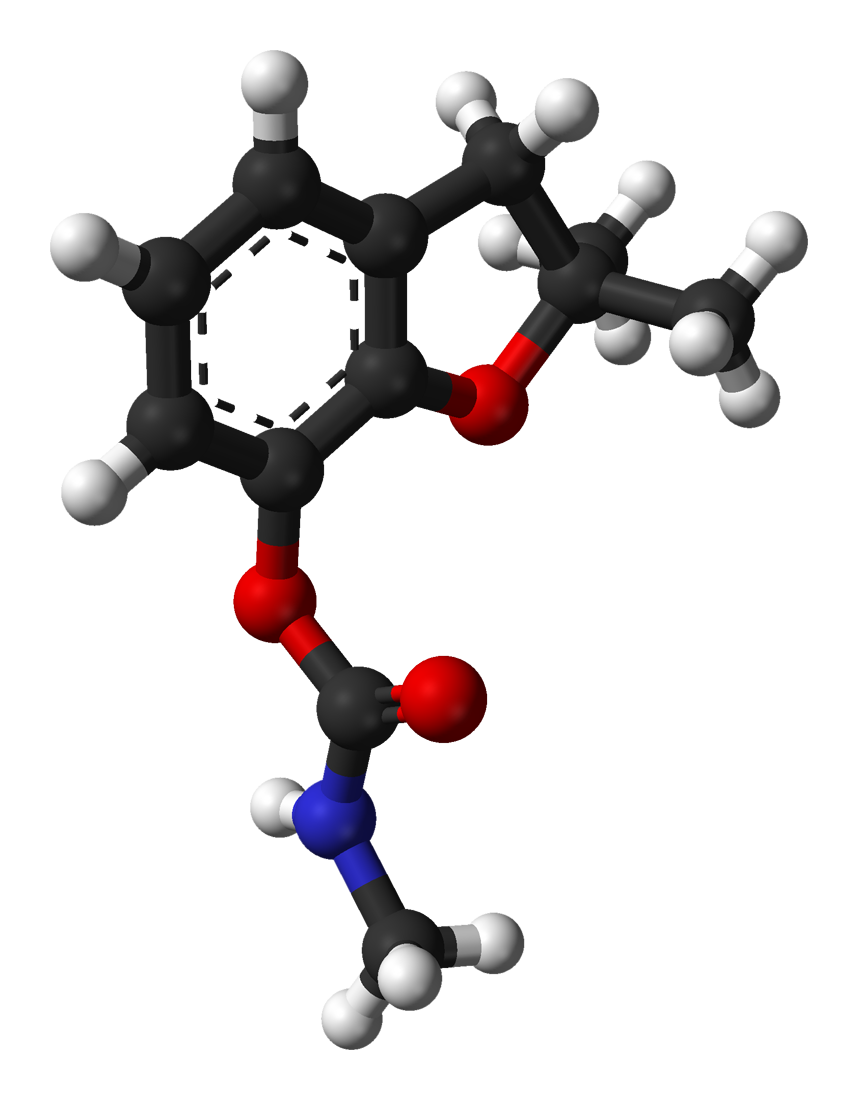
Carbofuran

Names
- Preferred IUPAC name 2,2-Dimethyl-2,3-dihydro-1-benzofuran-7-yl methylcarbamate
- Other names Furadan, Curater, Furacarb

Identifiers
CAS Number	1563-66-2
3D model (JSmol)	Interactive image
ChEBI	CHEBI:34611
ChEMBL	ChEMBL416081
ChemSpider	2468
ECHA InfoCard	100.014.867
KEGG	C14291
PubChem CID	2566
UNII	SKF77S6Y67
CompTox Dashboard (EPA)	DTXSID9020249
- InChI: InChI=1S/C12H15NO3/c1-12(2)7-8-5-4-6-9(10(8)16-12)15-11(14)13-3/h4-6H,7H2,1-3H3,(H,13,14) Key: DUEPRVBVGDRKAG-UHFFFAOYSA-N
- SMILES: CNC(=O)Oc1cccc2c1OC(C)C2

Properties
Chemical formula	C_{12}H_{15}NO_{3}
Molar mass	221.256 g·mol^{−1}
Appearance	White, crystalline solid
Density	1.18 g/cm^{3}
Melting point	151 °C (304 °F; 424 K)
Boiling point	313.3 °C (595.9 °F; 586.5 K)
Solubility in water	320 mg/L
Solubility	Highly soluble in N-methyl-2-pyrrolidone, dimethylformamide, dimethyl sulfoxide, acetone, acetonitrile, methylene chloride, cyclohexanone, benzene, and xylene
log P	2.32 (octanol/water)

Hazards
Flash point	143.3 °C (289.9 °F; 416.4 K)
- Lethal dose or concentration (LD, LC)
LD_{50} (median dose)	8–14 mg/kg (oral, rat); 19 mg/kg (oral, dog)
- NIOSH (US health exposure limits)
PEL (Permissible)	none
REL (Recommended)	TWA 0.1 mg/m^{3}
IDLH (Immediate danger)	N.D.
- Except where otherwise noted, data are given for materials in their standard state (at 25 °C [77 °F], 100 kPa). verify (what is ?) Infobox references

Carbofuran is a carbamate insecticide, banned in the US, the EU and Canada but still widely used in South America, Australia and Asia. It is a systemic insecticide, which means that the plant absorbs it through the roots, and from there the plant distributes it throughout its organs where insecticidal concentrations are attained. Carbofuran also has contact activity against pests. It is one of the most toxic pesticides still in use.

It is marketed under the trade names Furadan, by FMC Corporation and Curaterr 10 GR, by Bayer among several others.

Carbofuran exhibits toxicity mediated by the same mechanism as that of the notorious V-series nerve agents and presents a risk to human health. It is classified as an extremely hazardous substance in the United States as defined in Section 302 of the United States Emergency Planning and Community Right-to-Know Act (42 U.S.C. 11002), and is subject to strict reporting requirements by facilities which produce, store, or use it in significant quantities.

== Usage ==
Carbofuran is used around the world for a wide variety of crops. It is widely used in Asia, Australia, and South America. It is commonly used in Malaysia for vegetables like eggplant (brinjal) where it is a legally registered pesticide. Carbofuran acts through phloem sap against piercing-sucking pests such as green leafhoppers, brown plant hoppers, stem borers and whorl maggots. Usage has increased in recent years because it is one of the few insecticides effective on soybean aphids, which have expanded their range since 2002 to include most soybean-growing regions of the United States.

== Chemistry ==
The technical or chemical name of carbofuran is 2,3-dihydro-2,2-dimethyl-7-benzofuranyl methylcarbamate, and its CAS Number is 1563-66-2. It is manufactured by the reaction of methyl isocyanate with 2,3-dihydro-2,2-dimethyl-7-hydroxybenzofuran.

== Toxicity ==
Carbofuran has one of the highest acute toxicities to humans of any insecticide widely used on field crops (only aldicarb and parathion are more toxic). 1 ml (1/4 teaspoon) can be fatal to humans. Most carbofuran is applied by commercial applicators using closed systems with engineered controls so there is no exposure to it in preparation. However, in developing countries, occupational exposure to carbofuran and resultant carbofuran-serum protein labeling has been reported to impact human health and well-being. Since its toxic effects are due to its activity as a cholinesterase inhibitor it is considered a neurotoxic pesticide. A recent study reports that carbofuran is a structural mimic of the neurohormone melatonin and could directly bind to MT2 melatonin receptor (K_{i} = 1.7 uM). Disruption of melatonin signaling could impact the circadian rhythm balance and is linked to elevated risk of developing diabetes.

Carbofuran is highly toxic to vertebrates with an oral LD_{50} of 8–14 mg/kg in rats and 19 mg/kg in dogs.

Carbofuran is known to be particularly toxic to birds. In its granular form, a single grain will kill a bird. Birds often eat numerous grains of the pesticide, mistaking them for seeds, and then die shortly thereafter. Before the granular form was banned by the EPA in 1991, it was blamed for millions of bird deaths per year.

Carbofuran has been illegally used to intentionally poison wildlife not only in the US, Canada and Great Britain; poisoned wildlife have included coyotes, kites, golden eagles and buzzards. Secondary fatal poisoning of domestic and wild animals has been documented, specifically raptors (bald eagles and golden eagles), domestic dogs, raccoons, vultures and other scavengers. In Kenya, farmers are using carbofuran to kill lions and other predators.

In a number of publicized incidents worldwide, carbofuran has also been used to poison domestic pets.

Illegally smuggled carbofuran is used on 90% of marijuana grown illegally on public land in California. These illegal, carbofuran-contaminated California marijuana grows appear to be the source for the majority of marijuana consumed in states where marijuana hasn't been legalized.

Carbofuran is an endocrine disruptor and a probable reproduction/development intoxicant. At low-level exposures, carbofuran may cause transient alterations in the concentration of hormones. These alterations may consequently lead to serious reproductive problems following repeated exposure. When exposed in utero or during lactation, a decrease in sperm motility and sperm count along with an increase in percent abnormal sperm was observed in rats at 0.4 mg/kg dose level. In one study, the exposure of rats to sublethal amounts of carbofuran decreased testosterone by 88%, while the levels of progesterone, cortisol, and estradiol were significantly increased (1279%, 202%, and 150%, respectively).

== Bans ==
Carbofuran is banned in Canada, Sri Lanka and the European Union.

In 2008, the United States Environmental Protection Agency (EPA) announced that it intended to ban carbofuran. In December of that year, FMC Corp., the sole US manufacturer of carbofuran, announced that it had voluntarily requested that the EPA cancel all but six of the previously allowed uses of that chemical as a pesticide. With this change, carbofuran usage in the United States would be allowed only on corn, potatoes, pumpkins, sunflowers, pine seedlings and spinach grown for seed. However, in May 2009, the EPA canceled all food tolerances, an action which amounts to a de facto ban on its use on all crops grown for human consumption.

Carbofuran is de jure banned in Kenya. It still remains accessible in the nation.

=== Health scare in Thailand ===
Due to nonregistration of 4 carcinogenic chemicals used on crops not listed in the Dangerous Substances Act of Thailand, vegetables with residues of methomyl, carbofuran, dicrotophos, and EPN were taken off supermarket shelves in July 2012.

=== Death of lions in Kenya ===
In 2009, the CBS television news magazine 60 Minutes ran an exposé discussing the use of Furadan by Kenyan farmers as a poison to kill African lions. The piece suggested that Furadan was a serious threat to the future of the lion population in Africa. FMC has commented on this issue through the media and their websites including furadanfacts.com. They engaged with government officials, NGOs and others to try and resolve the illegal use of pesticides to kill wildlife. The company took action to stop the sale of this product and instituted a buyback program in East Africa when it was determined that the illegal and intentional misuse of chemicals against wildlife could not be controlled by education or stewardship programs alone. Despite this, however, National Geographic stated in 2018 that carbofuran "is still very much available" in Kenya.

== See also ==
- Dutch standards
