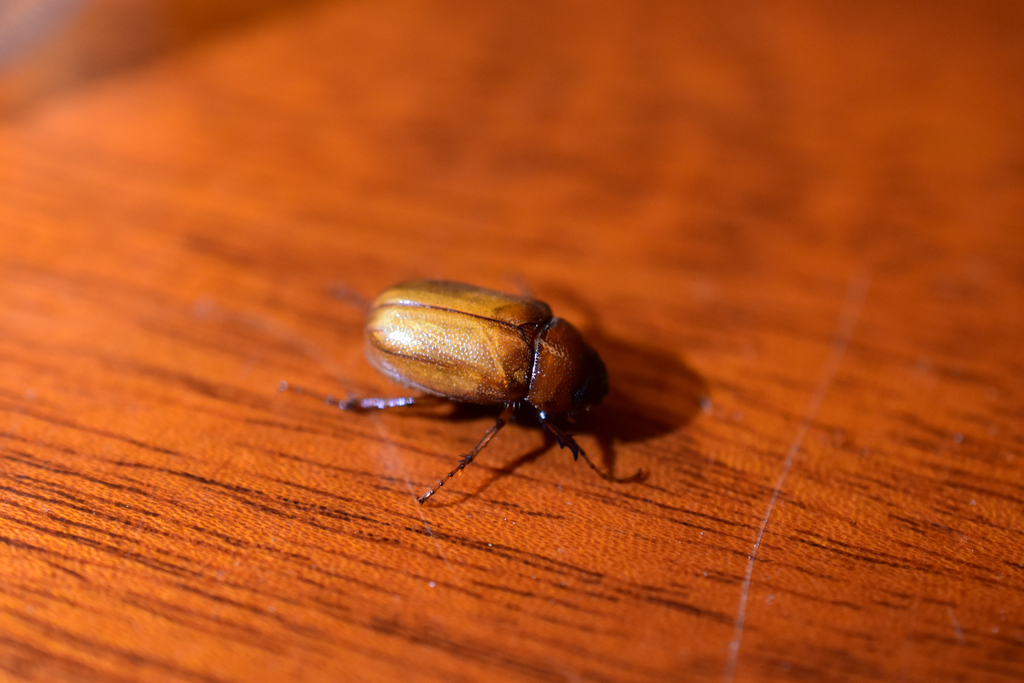

Scientific classification
- Kingdom: Animalia
- Phylum: Arthropoda
- Clade: Pancrustacea
- Class: Insecta
- Order: Coleoptera
- Suborder: Polyphaga
- Infraorder: Scarabaeiformia
- Family: Scarabaeidae
- Genus: Schizonycha
- Species: S. ruficollis

Binomial name
- Schizonycha ruficollis (Fabricius, 1781)

Synonyms
- Melolontha ruficollis Fabricius, 1781; Schizonycha ruficollis Arrow, 1923

= Schizonycha ruficollis =

Species of beetle

Schizonycha ruficollis is a species of june beetle found in India (Andhra Pradesh, Assam, Chhattisgarh, Haryana, Karnataka, Madhya Pradesh, Maharashtra, Odisha, Puducherry, Punjab, Rajasthan, Tamil Nadu, Uttar Pradesh, West Bengal, Himachal Pradesh, Uttarakhand), Nepal, Pakistan and Sri Lanka.

== Description ==
It is a shiny beetle with rufocastaneous color has an elongated body with average length of 12 to 13 mm. Clypeus emarginated and the upper head surface is roughly rugose. Third antennal segment beaded whereas in male, it is clubbed and long. Elytral punctuations are closer and irregular. Forelegs long where the tarsus are very longer than tibia.

== Biology ==
Adult beetles often seen from the nursery beds of teak just after the first monsoon showers in the month of June. Then the lifespan continued for about 10 to 18 days. Then beetles started to defoliate trees in the surroundings. Majority of beetles feed on leaves of rose plants extensively, but some also attack flowers. Grubs are generally feeding on root systems of teak seedlings. The attack can be seen with the wilting and dieback in forest nursery beds. Apart from teak, adults used many host plants such as Rosa, Morus, Tamarindus indica, Azadirachta indica, Saccharum officinarum, Ziziphus xylopyrus, Acacia catechu, Acacia leucophloea, Arachis hypogaea, Ziziphus jujuba and Ziziphus mauritiana.

The grubs can be eradicate from the cultivations by using several chemical and biological treatments. Many researches show that phorate 10% granular at the rate of 20 g/m2 and chlorpyrifos 20% emulsifiable concentrate are effective.
