= Chlorfenvinphos =

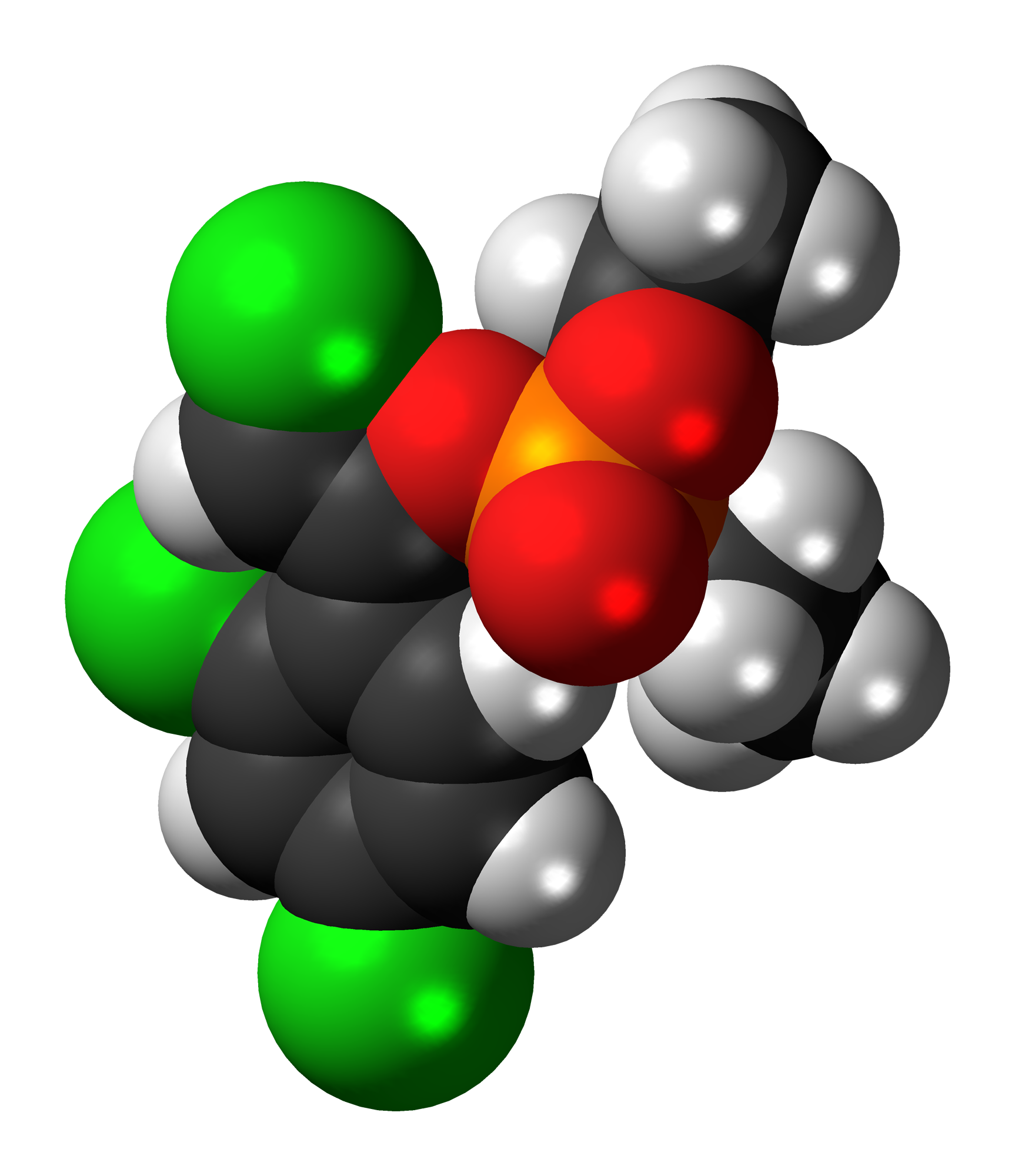

Names
- IUPAC name [(EZ)-2-Chloro-1-(2,4-dichlorophenyl)ethenyl] diethyl phosphate
- Other names Clofenvinfos; Chlorfenvinfos; Chlorphenvinfos; Chlofenvinphos; Chlofenvinfos; Vinylphate; Apachlor; Birlane; Dermaton; Enolofos; Haptarax; Haptasol; Dermaton; Sapercon; Steladone; Supona

Identifiers
CAS Number	470-90-6 (EZ); 18708-86-6 (E); 18708-87-7 (Z)
3D model (JSmol)	Interactive image
ChEMBL	ChEMBL2104653
ChemSpider	4526760
ECHA InfoCard	100.006.758
EC Number	207-432-0
KEGG	C18654
PubChem CID	5377784
RTECS number	TB8750000
UNII	F2G9XS1W91; WO4EMF0QD6 (E); 871L5HXP4D (Z)
UN number	3018
CompTox Dashboard (EPA)	DTXSID7034250
- InChI: InChI=1S/C12H14Cl3O4P/c1-3-17-20(16,18-4-2)19-12(8-13)10-6-5-9(14)7-11(10)15/h5-8H,3-4H2,1-2H3/b12-8- Key: FSAVDKDHPDSCTO-WQLSENKSSA-N; InChI=1/C12H14Cl3O4P/c1-3-17-20(16,18-4-2)19-12(8-13)10-6-5-9(14)7-11(10)15/h5-8H,3-4H2,1-2H3/b12-8- Key: FSAVDKDHPDSCTO-WQLSENKSBC
- SMILES: Clc1cc(Cl)ccc1C(OP(=O)(OCC)OCC)=[C@H]Cl

Properties
Chemical formula	C_{12}H_{14}Cl_{3}O_{4}P
Molar mass	359.56 g·mol^{−1}
Appearance	Amber liquid
Solubility in water	145 mg/L

Hazards
- GHS labelling
Pictograms	(GHS06: Toxic) (GHS09: Environmental hazard)
Signal word	Danger
Hazard statements	H300, H311, H330, H410
Precautionary statements	P260, P262, P264, P270, P271, P273, P280, P284, P301+P316, P302+P352, P304+P340, P316, P320, P321, P330, P361+P364, P391, P403+P233, P405, P501
NFPA 704 (fire diamond)	4 1 0
- Lethal dose or concentration (LD, LC)
LD_{50} (median dose)	15 mg/kg (rat, oral)
- Except where otherwise noted, data are given for materials in their standard state (at 25 °C [77 °F], 100 kPa). verify (what is ?) Infobox references

Chlorfenvinphos is an organophosphorus compound that was widely used as an insecticide and an acaricide. The molecule itself can be described as an enol ester derived from dichloroacetophenone and diethylphosphoric acid. Chlorfenvinphos has been included in many products since its first use in 1963. However, because of its toxic effect as a cholinesterase inhibitor it has been banned in several countries, including the United States and the European Union. Its use in the United States was discontinued in 1991.

The pure chemical is a colorless solid, but for commercial purposes, it is often marketed as an amber liquid. The insecticides, mostly used in liquid form, contain between 50% and 90% chlorfenvinphos. The substance easily mixes with acetone, ethanol, and propylene glycol. Furthermore, chlorfenvinphos is corrosive to metal and hydrolyzes in the environment.

It is classified as an extremely hazardous substance in the United States as defined in Section 302 of the U.S. Emergency Planning and Community Right-to-Know Act (42 U.S.C. 11002), and is subject to strict reporting requirements by facilities which produce, store, or use it in significant quantities.

== Pesticide use ==
=== History ===
Dermaton was the first registered product containing chlorfenvinphos. It was introduced in the United States in 1963 and was used as an insecticide and acaricide for controlling fleas and ticks on domestic pets and other animals. Between 1963 and 1970, additional uses were registered, including the use as fly spray, surface spray and larvicide. Because of these effects, chlorfenvinphos was often used on farms to control adult flies in dairy barns, milk rooms, poultry houses and yards, and in other animal buildings. Furthermore, it was used to control larval flies in manure storage pits and piles and other refuse accumulation areas around dairies and feedlots. In the early 1980s, chlorfenvinphos was registered for additional uses in a dust formulation for use in dog kennels and in dog collars for the control of fleas and ticks.

Outside the United States, chlorfenvinphos, registered under the trade names Birlane, C8949, CGA 26351, Sapecron, Steladone and Supona, was used as a soil insecticide for controlling root maggots, root worms and cutworms. Chlorfenvinphos was also used against Colorado beetles on potatoes and scale insects and mite eggs on citrus. Furthermore, the compound had the same uses as in the United States.

There is no quantitative information on the total volume of chlorfenvinphos really used as a pesticide in the United States or elsewhere. Since all uses of the chemical in the United States were canceled in 1991, use is likely to have declined, although there are no data showing this trend.

=== Regulation and advisories ===
No international regulations exist for the use of chlorfenvinphos, although standards and guidelines have been set to protect people from the possible harmful effects of the toxin. No regulation exists for inhalation exposure, but multiple minimal risk levels (MRL) have been estimated for oral exposure. These data have been developed from lowest observed adverse effect levels (LOAEL) in test rats, based on adverse neurological effects. The acute oral MRL has been established at 0.002 mg/kg/day, while the chronic MRL has been established somewhat lower, at 0.0007 mg/kg/day.

Furthermore, chlorfenvinphos is one of the chemicals regulated under “The Emergency Planning and Community Right-to-Know act of 1986”. This means that owners and operators of certain facilities that manufacture, import, process or otherwise use the chemical, are obligated to report their annual release of the chemical to any environmental media.

However, the use of chlorfenvinphos has now been banned in the European Union and in the United States. In Europe it is banned as a plant protection product. An exception is Switzerland, where chlorfenvinphos is still allowed for use in crops and certain vegetables under the brand name Birlane. In Australia, chlorfenvinphos is partially banned. Thus, it was withdrawn in alfalfa, potatoes and mushrooms, while it is still used in veterinary medicine for combating ectoparasites until 2013.

== Production ==
Chlorfenvinphos was first introduced in the United States in 1963, by the Shell International Chemical Company Ltd., Ciba AG (now Ciba-Geigy AG) and by Allied Chemical Corporation. Its main use was as an insecticide and acaricide used to control insect pests on livestock and household pests such as flies, fleas, and mites. Since its first application, many manufacturers included chlorfenvinphos in their products. Some common trade names are Birlane, Dermaton, Sapercon, Steladone, and Supona. Since 1991, however, information on current production of chlorfenvinphos has been conflicting. One source lists base producers of the compound as the American Cyanamid Company. However, no producers of chlorfenvinphos were identified in a 1993 Directory of Chemical Producers for the United States of America. Moreover, there have been no registered uses for this compound as a pesticide in the United States since 1995.

Chlorfenvinphos is produced by reaction of triethylphosphite (P(OEt)3) with 2,2,2,4-tetrachloro acetophenone (C8H4Cl4O). In the production process, both the Z and E isomers are formed in a ratio (Z:E) of 8.5:1. The technical grade material therefore contains over 92% chlorfenvinphos.

Unfortunately, no data is available in the Toxics Release Inventory (TRI) database on total environment releases of this compound from facilities. This is mainly because chlorfenvinphos was not considered a dangerous toxin until the early 1990s. Therefore, chlorfenvinphos is not one of the compounds about which facilities were required to report to the Toxic Release Inventory.

== Toxicokinetics ==
Chlorfenvinphos is most commonly absorbed into the body through either ingestion of food products that have been treated with the pesticide, or through dermal absorption, though the latter is much less efficient.

Once absorbed, chlorfenvinphos is widely distributed throughout the body, and has been detected in a variety of bodily fluids. However, as an organophosphorus compound, it does not accumulate well in tissues.

The first and most important step of metabolism of chlorfenvinphos in humans is accomplished by the enzyme cytochrome P450 in liver microsomes. This enzyme facilitates oxidative dealkylation of the compound to acetaldehyde and 2-chloro-1-(2,4-dichlorophenyl) vinylethylhydrogen phosphate, the latter of which quickly breaks down to acetophenone. Acetophenone is then reduced to an alcohol and conjugated by glutathione transferases.,

Excretion of chlorfenvinphos is fairly rapid. In rats, an administered dose is excreted in 4 days, mostly in urine.

== Mechanism of toxicity ==
The toxicity of chlorfenvinphos is primarily caused by its inhibition of cholinesterase activity. Chlorfenvinphos reacts with the acetylcholine binding sites of enzymes that hydrolyze acetylcholine, thereby preventing their catalysis of this reaction. The reaction itself is a phosphorylation, which is reversible. The phosphorylated enzymes can undergo conformational changes and additional reactions however, which prevent the dephosphorylation. This “aging” results in irreversible inhibition of the cholinesterase.

Acetylcholine is a neurotransmitter in the nervous system, it targets muscarinic and nicotinic receptors and receptors in the central nervous system. These receptors are used to pass on an action potential across the synaptic cleft between neurons. Inhibition of acetylcholinesterase enzymes results in the accumulation of acetylcholine at its receptors. This leads to continuous or excessive stimulation of neurons that respond to acetylcholine. Cholinergic poisoning leads to different symptoms, depending on the part of the nervous system that is affected. The most likely cause of death in chlorfenvinphos is respiratory failure due to paralysis and bronchoconstriction.

== Toxicity ==
=== Toxic effects ===
The toxic effects of accumulation of acetylcholine can be divided into three categories, based upon its actions in different parts of the nervous system. Muscarinic receptors that respond to acetylcholine are found in smooth muscles, the heart and exocrine glands. The muscarinic symptoms of cholinergic poisoning are therefore tightness in the chest, wheezing due to bronchoconstriction, bradycardia, miosis, increased salivation, lacrimation and sweating and increased peristalsis, which leads to nausea, vomiting and diarrhea.

Nicotinic receptors responding to acetylcholine can be found in skeletal muscle and the autonomic ganglia. The nicotinic symptoms of cholinergic poisoning are therefore fatigue, involuntary twitching, muscular weakness, hypertension and hyperglycemia.

Symptoms of accumulation of acetylcholine in the central nervous system are diverse and include tension, anxiety, ataxia, convulsions, depression of the respiratory and circulatory centers and coma.

=== Acute toxicity ===
The acute toxicity of chlorfenvinphos varies widely between species. Oral LD50 values range from 9.6–39 mg/kg in rats to >12,000 mg/kg in dogs. Though no direct data on the acute toxicity in humans is available, an in vitro study of the detoxification of chlorfenvinphos has shown that human liver enzymes were almost as effective as those of rabbits, who have an oral LD50 of 412-4,700 mg/kg.,

=== Long-term toxicity ===
Prolonged exposure to chlorfenvinphos has been observed to decrease plasma and erythrocyte cholinesterase activity in humans. No significant genotoxicity, carcinogenicity or teratogenicity has been reported. On the basis of a NOAEL of 0.05 mg/kg observed in rats, an acceptable daily intake for humans of 0.0005 mg/kg has been established.

== Biomarkers ==
=== Biomarkers of exposure ===
Traces of unchanged chlorfenvinphos and its polar metabolites can be detected in animals, which have been exposed to chlorfenvinphos. These small amounts can be used to prove that chlorfenvinphos exposure has occurred and the method of analysis is non-invasive.

Another method to assess chlorfenvinphos exposure is to measure the activity of cholinesterases in the blood. Two pools of cholinesterases exist in the blood: acetylcholinesterase in erythrocytes and pseudocholinesterase in plasma. The acetylcholinesterase in erythrocytes is identical to the acetylcholinesterase found in neuromuscular tissue. The function of plasma pseudocholinesterase is unknown, but its activity is considered to be a more sensitive biomarker for organophosphate exposure than erythrocyte cholinesterase activity. The inhibition of the individual cholinesterases or the inhibition of their combined activity can be used as a marker of exposure. However, cholinesterase inhibition is caused by all anticholinesterase compounds and is therefore not a specific biomarker for chlorfenvinphos. In addition, the activity of cholinesterases in the blood varies in populations and there are no studies which have measured a correlation between chlorfenvinphos exposure and cholinesterase inhibition. There have been suggestions that chlorfenvinphos or its metabolites would be a better biomarker of exposure than its cholinesterase activity inhibition.

=== Biomarkers of effect ===
In combination with analysis of reductions in cholinesterase activity in the blood, symptoms of organophosphate poisoning can be used to identify victims of organophosphate poisoning. These symptoms are not specific for chlorfenvinphos, but for anticholinesterase compounds in general.

== Treatments of exposure ==
Ingestion of chlorfenvinphos, either by accident or through suicidal intent, can be treated as with other acute organophosphate poisonings. This includes a combination of three approaches:

1. Administration of an anticholinergic such as atropine, considered an antidote;
2. Administration of a cholinesterase reactivator, in the pyridinium oxime family, usually pralidoxime;
3. Administration of anticonvulsants, e.g. benzodiazepines (of which diazepam is most effective).

The efficacy of oxime treatment is controversial. Ingestion of organophosphates as residues on food rarely reaches clinically relevant doses.
