= Naled =

Organophosphate insecticide

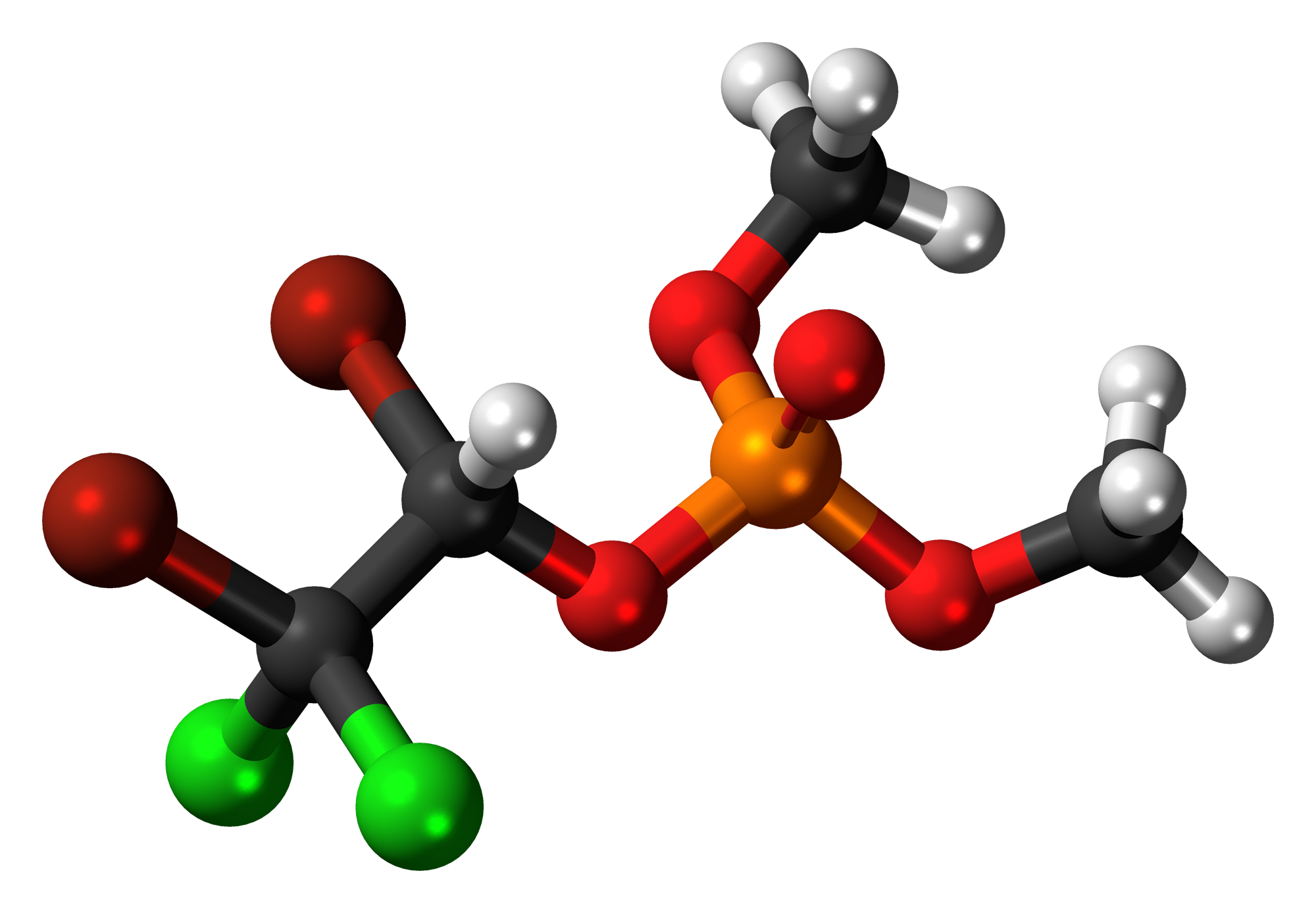

Names
- IUPAC name Dimethyl-1,2-dibromo-2,2-dichlorethyl phosphate
- Other names Dibrom, 1,2-Dibromo-2,2-dichloroethyl dimethyl phosphate

Identifiers
CAS Number	300-76-5
3D model (JSmol)	Interactive image
Beilstein Reference	2049930
ChEBI	CHEBI:38729
ChEMBL	ChEMBL1887067
ChemSpider	4267
ECHA InfoCard	100.005.545
EC Number	206-098-3
KEGG	C18749
PubChem CID	4420
RTECS number	TB9450000
UNII	PAM1AI9KU1
UN number	3018 2783
CompTox Dashboard (EPA)	DTXSID1024209
- InChI: InChI=1S/C4H7Br2Cl2O4P/c1-10-13(9,11-2)12-3(5)4(6,7)8/h3H,1-2H3 Key: BUYMVQAILCEWRR-UHFFFAOYSA-N; InChI=1/C4H7Br2Cl2O4P/c1-10-13(9,11-2)12-3(5)4(6,7)8/h3H,1-2H3 Key: BUYMVQAILCEWRR-UHFFFAOYAA
- SMILES: COP(=O)(OC)OC(C(Cl)(Cl)Br)Br

Properties
Chemical formula	C_{4}H_{7}O_{4}PBr_{2}Cl_{2}
Molar mass	380.8 g/mol
Appearance	Colorless to white solid or straw-colored liquid
Density	1.96 g/mL (25°C)
Melting point	27 °C; 80 °F; 300 K
Boiling point	decomposes
Vapor pressure	0.0002 mmHg (20°C)

Hazards
- GHS labelling
Pictograms	(GHS07: Exclamation mark) (GHS09: Environmental hazard)
Signal word	Warning
Hazard statements	H302, H312, H315, H319, H400
Precautionary statements	P264, P270, P273, P280, P301+P312, P302+P352, P305+P351+P338, P312, P321, P322, P330, P332+P313, P337+P313, P362, P363, P391, P501
Flash point	noncombustible
- Lethal dose or concentration (LD, LC)
LD_{50} (median dose)	156 mg/kg (inhaled, mouse); 222 mg/kg (oral, mouse); 160 mg/kg (oral, rat); 430 mg/kg (oral, mammal); 250 mg/kg (oral, rat); 330 mg/kg (oral, mouse)
- NIOSH (US health exposure limits)
PEL (Permissible)	TWA 3 mg/m^{3} [skin]
REL (Recommended)	TWA 3 mg/m^{3} [skin]
IDLH (Immediate danger)	200 mg/m^{3}
Safety data sheet (SDS)	MSDS
- Except where otherwise noted, data are given for materials in their standard state (at 25 °C [77 °F], 100 kPa). Infobox references

Naled (Dibrom) is an organophosphate insecticide. Its chemical name is dimethyl 1,2-dibromo-2,2-dichloroethylphosphate.

Naled is stable in anhydrous condition and must be stored away from light. It must also be stored under normal pressure and temperatures. It degrades in the presence of water and alkali, and produces toxic chloride fumes if exposed to acids or acidic fumes. Contact with metals, reducing agents, or sulfhydryls cause naled to release bromide and revert to dichlorvos.

== Uses ==
Naled is used primarily to control adult mosquitos. It is also registered to control black flies, and leaf eating insects on a variety of fruits, vegetables, and nuts. Approximately 70% of naled in USA is used in mosquito control, and approximately 30% in agriculture. Naled has also been used in veterinary medicine to kill parasitic worms in dogs.

It has been used extensively within the United States since the 1950s. Naled was used in New Orleans after Hurricane Katrina, in North Carolina after Hurricane Florence (2018), and has been used historically in Puerto Rico to control dengue.

== Toxicity ==
The Environmental Protection Agency has determined that exposure levels from eating crops treated with Naled are below the level of concern. With higher exposures, however, naled can cause cholinesterase inhibition in humans, which in turn can overstimulate the nervous system causing nausea, dizziness, confusion, and at very high exposures, respiratory paralysis and death. It has the UN hazard classification of 6.1 (inhalation hazard) and is prohibited for use as an insecticide within the EU.

Naled may cross the placenta if it is in the bloodstream of a mammal. Repeated exposures may also cause future behavioral problems, as well as issues with neurodevelopment, growth, and respiratory health in offspring. Chronic exposure to dichlorvos, a metabolite of naled, has also been linked to neurological issues, such as Parkinson's disease and nigrostriatal dopaminergic degeneration. Persons who work closely with naled or other organophosphate pesticides should undergo regular testing of their cholinesterase levels.

EPA classifies naled as Group E or non-carcinogenic for humans. Neither naled nor its metabolite, dichlorvos, build up in breast milk or breast tissue.

In a 2017 general-population study of the chemical, University of Michigan researchers found that children in China who had the highest prenatal exposure to naled had, at age 9 months, 3% to 4% lower scores on tests of their fine motor skills, compared with those with the lowest exposure.

== Ecological effects ==
Naled is considered highly toxic to bees, as well as being moderately to highly toxic to birds and toxic to most aquatic life. Naled is also toxic to butterflies at amounts typically used to control mosquitoes. The mule deer is among those most resistant to its effects.

== 2015–16 Zika virus epidemic ==
Aerial spraying of naled has been recommended by the Centers for Disease Control and Prevention and United States Environmental Protection Agency for the prevention of the spread of the Zika virus in the United States. Experts at both the CDC and EPA, as well as independent universities, have argued that naled is safer than other chemicals and should not cause significant health issues due to the low level of exposure.

The federal government had considered using the chemical in Puerto Rico to stop the spread of Zika, but decided against it due to the potential danger to pregnant women. Its proposed use against Zika led to protests in Puerto Rico.

Miami is using specialized trucks to spray naled and Bacillus thuringiensis israelensis (BTI). Governor Rick Scott said that the CDC recommended using helicopters to spray the insecticides, but some people in Miami and Miami Beach are opposed to aerial spraying.

Spraying of naled in Dorchester County, South Carolina purportedly led to the deaths of 3 million honeybees and increased criticism by beekeepers. Beekeepers in the county complained that they had not been notified of spraying before it happened. Juanita Stanley, a beekeeper and co-owner of Flowerton Bee Farm and Supply, told CNN, "Now, I'm going to have to destroy my hives, the honey, all my equipment. It's all contaminated." Jennifer Holmes, vice-president of the Florida State Beekeepers Association, compared the loss of bees to other forms of agriculture, saying, "If there was a regulation that allowed some spraying that would kill half of your livestock overnight, how would you recover?" She went on to say that "we understand the serious threat of possible disease, but we also have to maintain our agricultural livelihood.”

== See also ==
- Malathion - another insecticide sprayed from the air to control mosquitos
- Bacillus thuringiensis israelensis - a biological control agent sprayed from the air to control mosquitos
