= Fly spray =

Aerosol used in killing flies

Fly spray

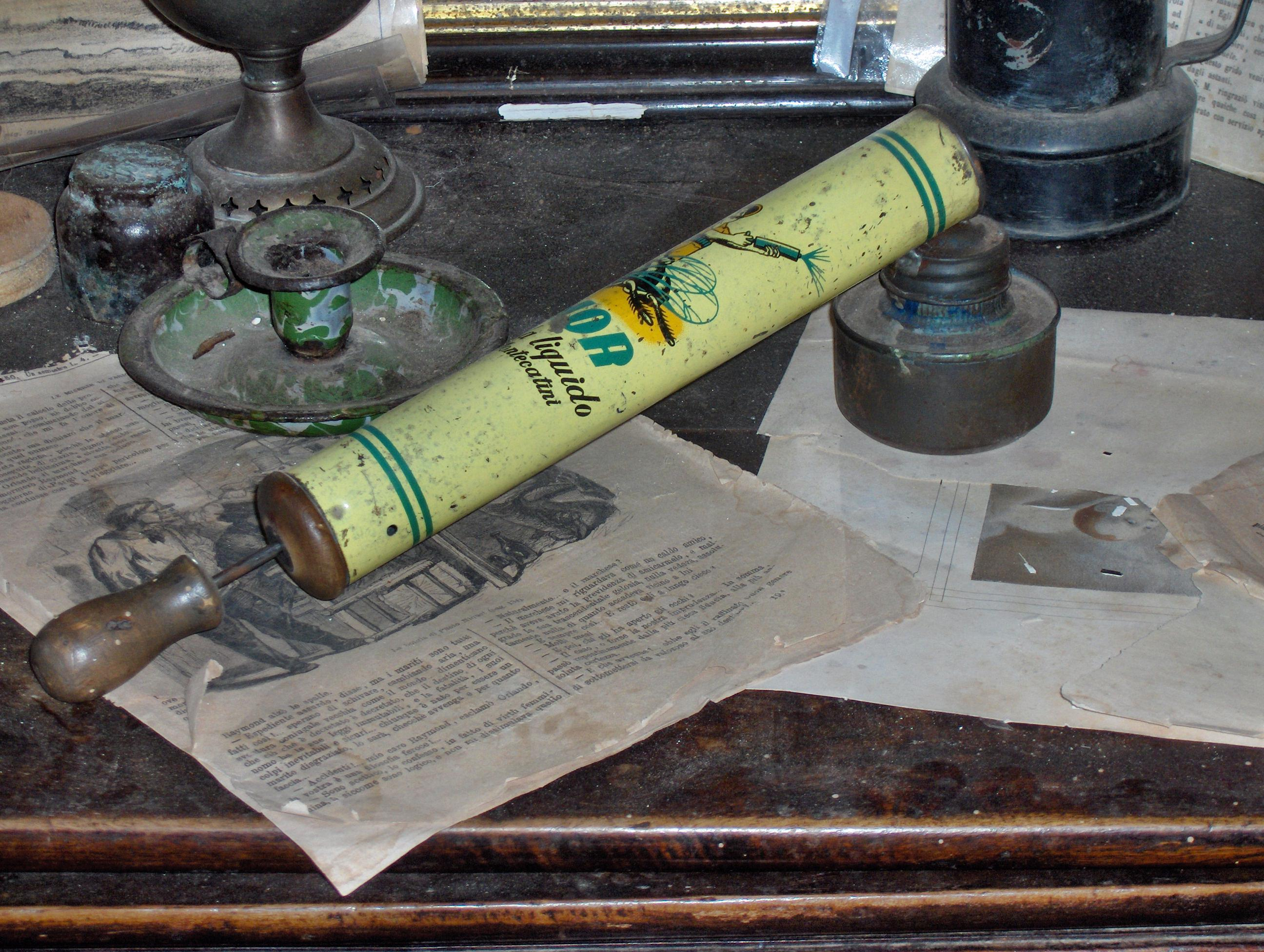
Old fly spray

Fly spray is a chemical insecticide that comes in an aerosol can that is sprayed into the air to kill flies. Fly sprays will kill various insects such as house flies and wasps.

== Principles ==
Fly spray contains chemicals (including many organophosphate compounds) that bind to and permanently block the action of an enzyme called acetylcholinesterase. Acetyl choline (ACh) is the nerve transmitter substance released by motor neurones (at a site called the neuromuscular junction) to stimulate muscle contraction. The muscles relax (stop contracting) when the ACh is removed from the neuromuscular junction (NMJ) by the action of acetylcholinesterase. By inhibiting the cholinesterase the insect can no longer break down ACh in the NMJ and so its muscles lock up in a state of tetany (continuous contraction) making flying and respiration impossible, and the insect then dies of asphyxiation.

The Fly spray is shown to be effective against black flies. The U.S. Environmental Protection Agency released a study detailing the effectiveness of black fly spray.

== Safety ==
Like many insecticides, fly spray can be toxic to a host of other organisms including birds, fish, beneficial insects, and non-target plants.

In the United States, fly sprays often contain the powerful insect toxin dichlorvos which is often targeted by environmental groups as a carcinogenic compound. While the small quantities found in fly spray may be negligible, the insect toxin can contaminate soil, water, turf, and other vegetation if disposed improperly.
