= Metrifonate =

Chemical compound

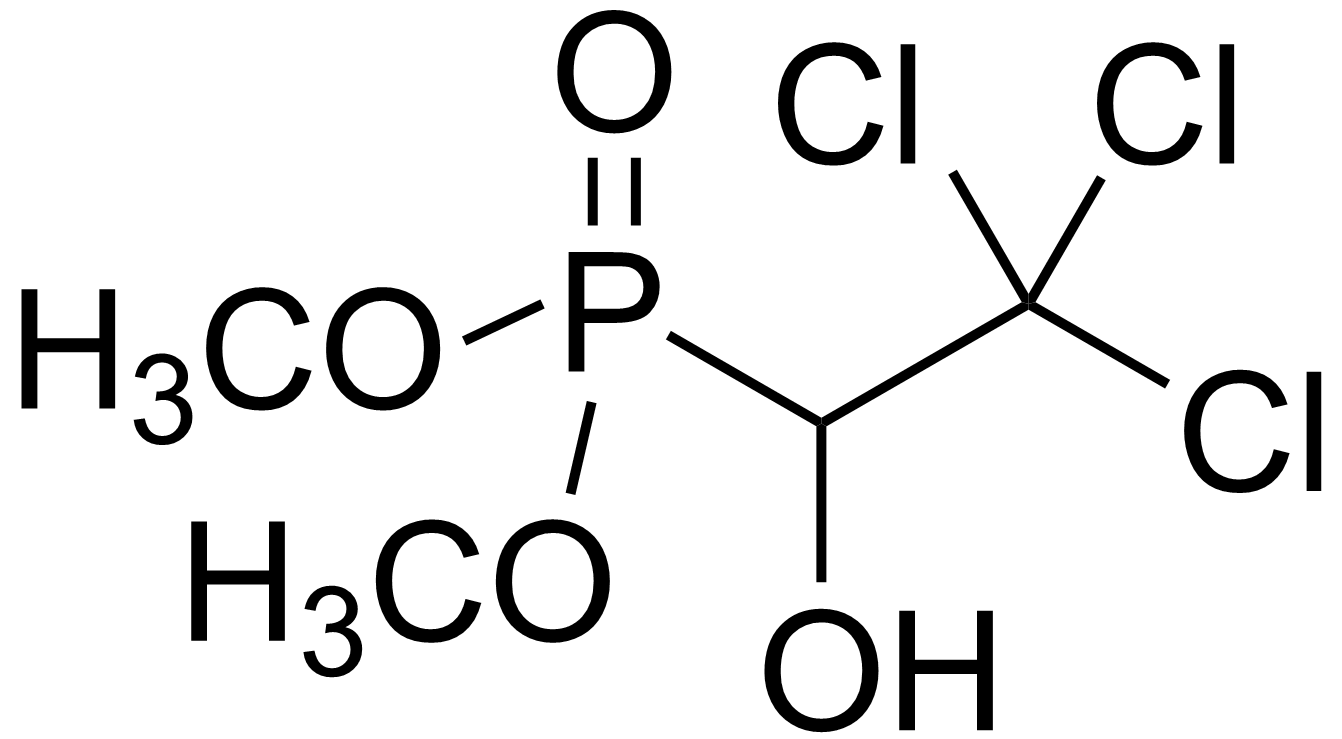

Clinical data
- Trade names: Chlorophos; Mazoten; Dimetox; Chlorak; Trichlorfon; Bovinox; Dioxaphos (and many others)
- Other names: Trichlorphon
- AHFS/Drugs.com: International Drug Names
- ATC code: P02BB01 (WHO) QP52AB01 (WHO) QP53AF02 (WHO)

Pharmacokinetic data
- Elimination half-life: 3 hours

Identifiers
- IUPAC name: (RS)-Dimethyl (2,2,2-trichloro-1-hydroxyethyl)phosphonate
- CAS Number: 52-68-6
- PubChem CID: 5853
- ChemSpider: 5644
- UNII: DBF2DG4G2K
- KEGG: C07971
- ChEBI: CHEBI:6908
- CompTox Dashboard (EPA): DTXSID0021389
- ECHA InfoCard: 100.000.137

Chemical and physical data
- Formula: C_{4}H_{8}Cl_{3}O_{4}P
- Molar mass: 257.43 g·mol^{−1}
- 3D model (JSmol): Interactive image
- Chirality: Racemic mixture
- SMILES: COP(=O)(C(C(Cl)(Cl)Cl)O)OC
- InChI: InChI=1S/C4H8Cl3O4P/c1-10-12(9,11-2)3(8)4(5,6)7/h3,8H,1-2H3; Key:NFACJZMKEDPNKN-UHFFFAOYSA-N

Metrifonate (INN) or trichlorfon (USAN) is an irreversible organophosphate acetylcholinesterase inhibitor. It is a prodrug which is activated non-enzymatically into the active agent dichlorvos.

It is used as an insecticide. According to the US Environmental Protection Agency trichlorfon has been used on golf course turf, home lawns, non-food contact areas of food and meat processing plants, ornamental shrubs and plants, and ornamental and baitfish ponds. Used to control caterpillars, white grubs, mole crickets, cattle lice, sod webworms, leaf miners, stink bugs, flies, ants, cockroaches, earwigs, crickets, diving beetle, water scavenger beetle, water boatman backswimmer, water scorpions, giant water bugs and pillbugs. After reregistration, a number of its uses were voluntarily restricted, and currently, it is used in nonfood areas to control flies, roaches, and ants among other pests. Outdoors it is used on ornamental plants, golf courses, and lawn grass to treat lepidopteran larvae pests, it is also used to treat flies in animal husbandry in areas that are not accessible to animals, it also used to control harvester ants.

It can be used to treat schistosomiasis caused by Schistosoma haematobium, but is no longer commercially available.

It has been proposed for use in treatment of Alzheimer's disease, but use for that purpose is not currently recommended.

== Bans and restrictions ==
In the United States, trichlorfon/metrifonate may only be used on nonfood and nonfeed sites.

Trichlorfon/metrifonate was banned in the EU in 2008 (Regulation (EC) 689/2008) and in Brazil in 2010.

Trichlorfon/metrifonate was banned in Argentina in 2018, noting that trichlorvon converts to dichlorvos by metabolism in plants, as well as by biodegradation of the soil.

Trichlorfon/metrifonate was banned in New Zealand in 2011.

Trichlorfon/metrifonate was banned in India from 2020.
