= Dicofol =

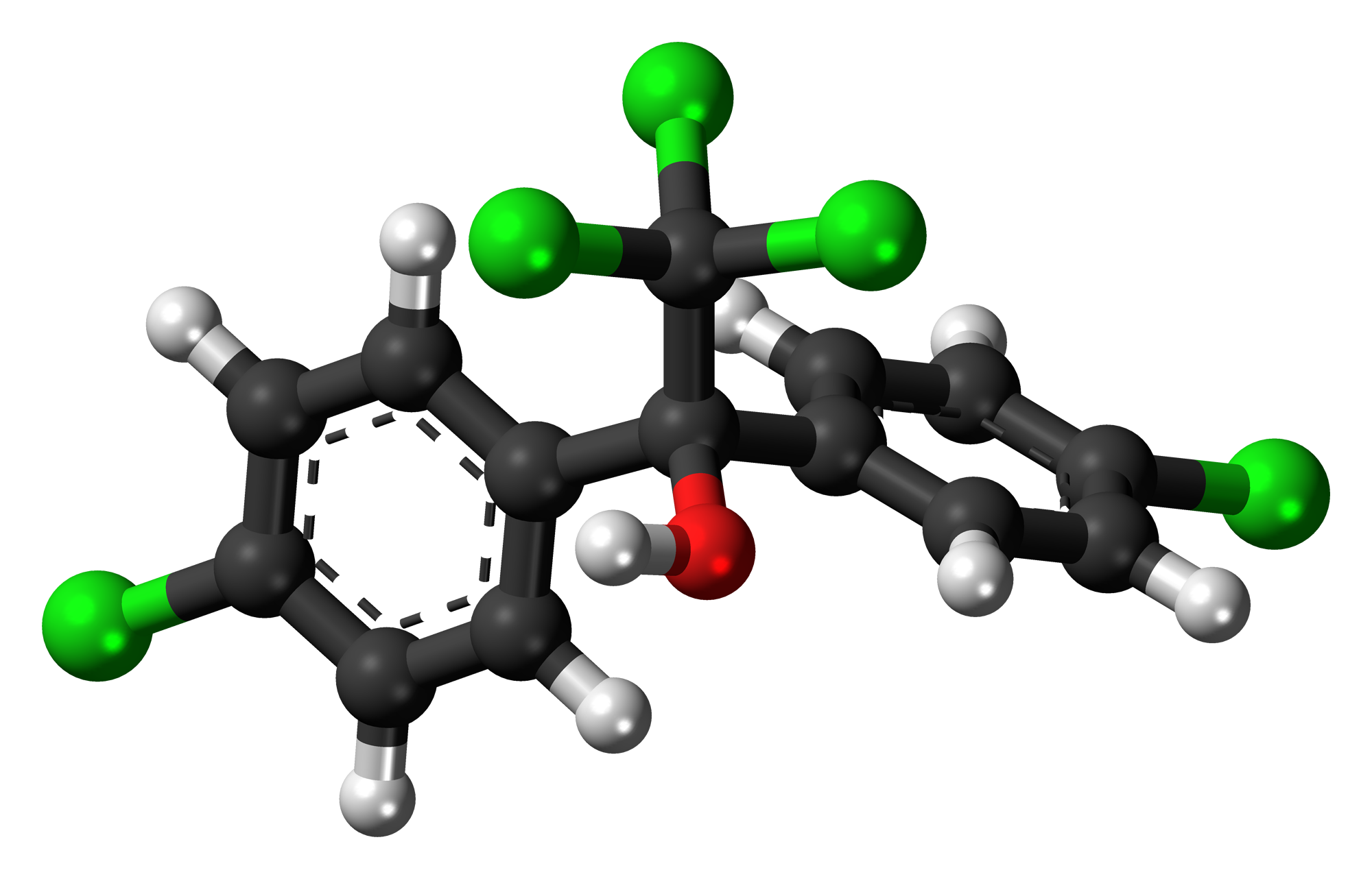

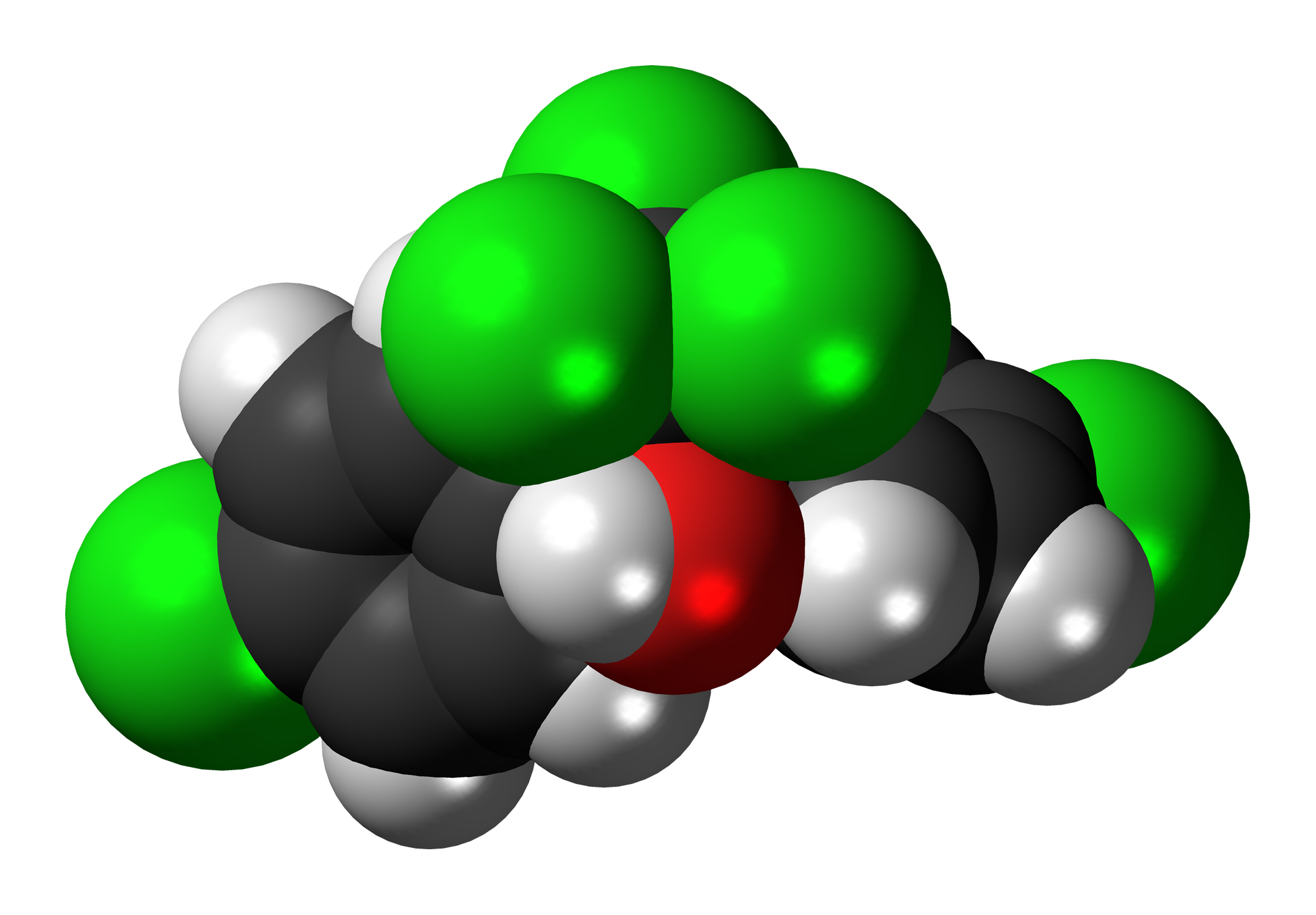

Names
- Preferred IUPAC name 2,2,2-Trichloro-1,1-bis(4-chlorophenyl)ethan-1-ol

Identifiers
CAS Number	115-32-2
3D model (JSmol)	Interactive image
Beilstein Reference	1886299
ChEBI	CHEBI:34692
ChEMBL	ChEMBL228511
ChemSpider	7970
ECHA InfoCard	100.003.711
EC Number	204-082-0
KEGG	C14301
PubChem CID	8268
UNII	W4WMM0WS91
UN number	3082 2761
CompTox Dashboard (EPA)	DTXSID4020450
- InChI: InChI=1S/C14H9Cl5O/c15-11-5-1-9(2-6-11)13(20,14(17,18)19)10-3-7-12(16)8-4-10/h1-8,20H Key: UOAMTSKGCBMZTC-UHFFFAOYSA-N; InChI=1/C14H9Cl5O/c15-11-5-1-9(2-6-11)13(20,14(17,18)19)10-3-7-12(16)8-4-10/h1-8,20H Key: UOAMTSKGCBMZTC-UHFFFAOYAZ
- SMILES: Clc1ccc(cc1)C(O)(c2ccc(Cl)cc2)C(Cl)(Cl)Cl

Properties
Chemical formula	C_{14}H_{9}Cl_{5}O
Molar mass	370.48 g·mol^{−1}
- Except where otherwise noted, data are given for materials in their standard state (at 25 °C [77 °F], 100 kPa). verify (what is ?) Infobox references

Dicofol is an insecticide, an organochlorine that is chemically related to DDT. Dicofol is a miticide that is very effective against spider mites. Its production and use is banned internationally under the Stockholm Convention.

One of the intermediates used in its production is DDT. This has caused criticism by many environmentalists; however, the World Health Organization classifies dicofol as a Level II, "moderately hazardous" pesticide. It is known to be harmful to aquatic animals, and can cause eggshell thinning in various species of birds.

== Difference between dicofol and DDT ==
Dicofol is structurally similar to DDT. It differs from DDT by the replacement of the hydrogen (H) on C-1 by a hydroxyl (OH) functional group. One of the intermediates used in its production is DDT.

== Chemistry ==
Dicofol is usually synthesized from technical DDT. During the synthesis, DDT is first chlorinated to an intermediate, Cl-DDT, followed by hydrolyzing to dicofol. After the synthesis reaction, DDT and Cl-DDT may remain in the dicofol product as impurities.

- Formula: C_{14}H_{9}Cl_{5}O
- Chemical names: 2,2,2-Trichloro-1,1-bis(4-chlorophenyl)ethanol
- Appearance: Pure dicofol is a white crystalline solid. Technical dicofol is a red-brown or amber viscous liquid with an odor like fresh-cut hay.
- Solubility: It is stable under cool and dry conditions, is practically insoluble in water but soluble in organic solvents. Solubility: 0.8 mg/L (25 °C) in water.
- Melting Point: 78.5 - 79.5 °C for pure dicofol, 50 °C for technical dicofol
- Vapor Pressure: Negligible at room temperature
- Molecular Weight: 370.49 g/mol
- Partition Coefficient: 4.2788
- Adsorption Coefficient: 5000 (estimated)

== Impurities ==
Manufacturing-use dicofol products contain a number of DDT analogs as manufacturing impurities. These include the o,p' and p,p' isomers of DDT, DDE, DDD, and a substance called extra-chlorine DDT or Cl-DDT

== Use and formulations ==
Foliar spray on agricultural crops and ornamentals, and in or around agricultural and domestic buildings for mite control. It is formulated as emulsifiable concentrates, wettable powders, dusts, ready-to-use liquids, and aerosol sprays. In many countries, dicofol is also used in combination with other pesticides such as the organophosphates, methyl parathion, and dimethoate.

== Producers ==
Dicofol first appeared in the scientific literature in 1956, and was introduced onto the market by the US-based multinational company Rohm & Haas in 1957. Other current manufacturers include Hindustan Insecticides Limited (India), Lainco (Spain), and ADAMA Agricultural Solutions (Formerly Makhteshim-Agan) (Israel). It is sold under a number of trade names, including Hilfol, Kelthane and Acarin.

In 1986, the US Environmental Protection Agency (EPA) temporarily canceled the use of dicofol because relatively high levels of DDT contamination were ending up in the final product. Modern processes can produce technical grade dicofol that contains less than 0.1% DDT.

== Estimated usage as a pesticide ==
The Pesticide Survey, USA 1987 through 1996, reports that the total annual domestic agricultural usage of dicofol averaged about 860,000 pounds (390,000 kg) active ingredient (a.i.) for about 720,000 acres (2,900 km^{2}) treated. Most of the area is treated with 2 pounds (0.91 kg) a.i. or less per application, and the average acre is treated with about 1.2 pounds a.i. per year (1.3 kg/(ha·yr)). Fruits tend to have the highest application rates. The largest markets for dicofol in terms of total pounds active ingredient are cotton (over 50%) and citrus (almost 30%). Although only about 4% of the cotton acres grown are treated with dicofol, over 60% of all crop acres treated with dicofol are cotton acres. The remaining usage is primarily on other fruits and vegetables. Most of the US usage is in California and Florida.

== Effects ==
The California Department of Food and Agriculture has one of the world's most extensive incident reporting systems. Between 1982 and 1992, 38 incidents involving dicofol alone were reported: systemic 19 (50%); skin 10 (26%); eye 8 (21%); and eye/skin 1 (3%). The number of incidents per 1,000 applications for all illnesses ranged from 0.11 to 0.21.

The US National Pesticides Telecommunications Network database collected reports from 1984 to 1991 showing 91 human, 9 animal and 31 other poisoning incidents for a total of 131 incidents involving dicofol from 571 phone calls made to the hotline.

An assessment of dicofol by the UK Pesticides Safety Directorate in 1996 found that residues in apples, pears, blackcurrants and strawberries were higher than expected.

There is no established US maximum contaminant level (MCL) or health advisory levels for residues of dicofol in drinking water. In the European Union, the maximum level is the same for all active ingredients 0.1 mg/L.

In 1990, the use of dicofol was suspended in Sweden for environmental reasons. In Switzerland its use is permitted for research purposes only. Throughout the European Union dicofol containing more than lg/kg (0.1%) of DDT or DDT related compounds cannot be used.

The 1998 US EPA review of dicofol recommended a number of changes in order to protect the environment and wildlife. Dicofol applications are limited to no more than one per year. In the UK, the maximum number of treatments permitted is two per year for apples and hops, and two per crop for strawberries, protected crops and tomatoes.

In 1980, an accident at the US Tower Chemical Company led to a release of dicofol into Lake Apopka in Florida. Ten years later Dr Guillette of Florida University linked this incident to a subsequent decline in the fertility of alligators in the lake. The US EPA is still not clear whether dicofol is involved in the reproductive failure of the alligator population following the accidental spill.

== Toxicity ==
It is classified by the World Health Organization as a Class II, 'moderately hazardous' pesticide.

The acute oral LD_{50} for dicofol is 587 mg/kg for rats.

Dicofol is a nerve poison. The exact mode of action is not known, although in mammals it causes hyperstimulation of nerve transmission along nerve axons (cells). This effect is thought to be related to the inhibition of certain enzymes in the central nervous system.

Symptoms of ingestion and/or respiratory exposure include nausea, dizziness, weakness and vomiting; dermal exposure may cause skin irritation or a rash; and eye contact may cause conjunctivitis. Poisoning may affect the liver, kidneys or the central nervous system. Very severe cases may result in convulsions, coma, or death from respiratory failure.

Dicofol can be stored in fatty tissue. Intense activity or starvation may mobilize the chemical, resulting in the reappearance of toxic symptoms long after actual exposure.

== Chronic effects ==
Tests on laboratory animals show that the primary effects after long term exposure to dicofol include increases in liver weight and enzyme induction in the rat, mouse and dog.

There are also effects relating to altered adrenocorticoid metabolism (part of the hormonal system). In the rat hormonal changes were accompanied by the histological observation of vacuolation (empty cavities) of the cells of the adrenal cortex.

== Carcinogenecity ==
The US EPA has classified dicofol as a Group C, possible human carcinogen. There is limited evidence that it may cause cancer in laboratory animals, but there is no evidence that it causes cancer in humans. This classification was based on animal test data that showed an increase in the incidence of liver adenomas (benign tumour) and combined liver adenomas and carcinomas in male mice.

== Reproductive effects ==
Reproductive effects in rat offspring have been observed only at doses high enough to also cause toxic effects on the livers, ovaries, and feeding behavior of the parents. Rats fed diets containing dicofol through two generations exhibited adverse effects on the survival and/or growth of newborns at 6.25 and 12.5 mg/kg/day

- Teratogenic effects: No teratogenic effects are observed when rats were given up to 25 mg/kg/day on days 6 through 15 of pregnancy
- Mutagenic effects: Laboratory tests have shown that dicofol is not mutagenic
- Endocrine disruption: Evidence for dicofol to cause endocrine disruption is suggestive, but not definitive

A 2007 study by the California Department of Public Health found that women in the first eight weeks of pregnancy who live near farm fields sprayed with dicofol and the related organochloride pesticide endosulfan are several times more likely to give birth to children with autism. These results are highly preliminary due to the small number of women and children involved and lack of evidence from other studies.

== Metabolism ==
Dicofol is converted in rats to the metabolites 4,4'-dichlorobenzophenone and 4,4'-dichlorodicofol.

Studies of the metabolism of dicofol in rats, mice, and rabbits have shown that ingested dicofol is rapidly absorbed, distributed primarily to fat, and readily eliminated in feces. When mice were given a single oral dose of 25 mg/kg dicofol, approximately 60% of the dose was eliminated within 96 hours, 20% in the urine, and 40% in the feces. Concentrations in body tissues peaked between 24 and 48 hours following dosing, with 10% of the dose found in fat, followed by the liver and other tissues. Levels in tissues other than fat declined sharply after the peak.

== Ecological effects ==
Effects on birds: Dicofol is slightly toxic to birds. The 8-day dietary LC50 is 3010 ppm in bobwhite quail, 1418 ppm in Japanese quail, and 2126 ppm in ring-necked pheasant. Eggshell thinning and reduced offspring survival were noted in the mallard duck, American kestrel, ring dove, and screech owl.

Effects on aquatic organisms: Dicofol is highly toxic to fish, aquatic invertebrates, and algae. The LC50 is 0.12 mg/L in rainbow trout, 0.37 mg/L in sheepshead minnow, 0.06 mg/L in mysid shrimp, 0.015 mg/L in shell oysters, and 0.075 mg/L in algae.

Effects on other organisms: Dicofol is not toxic to bees.

== Degradation ==
Breakdown in soil and groundwater: Dicofol is moderately persistent in soil, with a half-life of 60 days. Dicofol is susceptible to chemical breakdown in moist soils. It is also subject to degradation by UV light. In a silty loam soil, its photodegradation half-life was 30 days. Under anaerobic soil conditions, the half-life for dicofol was 15.9 days.

Dicofol is practically insoluble in water and adsorbs very strongly to soil particles. It is therefore nearly immobile in soils and unlikely to infiltrate groundwater. Even in sandy soil, dicofol was not detected below the top 3 inches (76 mm) in standard soil column tests. It is possible for dicofol to enter surface waters when soil erosion occurs.

Breakdown in water: Dicofol degrades in water or when exposed to UV light at pH levels above 7. Its half-life in solution at pH 5 is 47 to 85 days. Because of its very high absorption coefficient (Koc), dicofol is expected to adsorb to sediment when released into open waters.

Breakdown in vegetation: In a number of studies, dicofol residues on treated plant tissues have been shown to remain unchanged for up to 2 years.

== See also ==
- DDT
- Methoxychlor
