= Carbophenothion =

Names
- Preferred IUPAC name S-{[(4-Chlorophenyl)sulfanyl]methyl} O,O-diethyl phosphorodithioate
- Other names Stauffer R 1303

Identifiers
| CAS Number | 786-19-6 |
| 3D model (JSmol) | Interactive image |
| ChEBI | CHEBI:554299 |
| ChEMBL | ChEMBL452866 |
| ChemSpider | 12536 |
| ECHA InfoCard | 100.011.204 |
| EC Number | 212-324-1 |
| PubChem CID | 13081 |
| UNII | 998NGA2Q61 |
| CompTox Dashboard (EPA) | DTXSID7022120 |
- InChI: InChI=1S/C11H16ClO2PS3/c1-3-13-15(16,14-4-2)18-9-17-11-7-5-10(12)6-8-11/h5-8H,3-4,9H2,1-2H3 Key: VEDTXTNSFWUXGQ-UHFFFAOYSA-N; InChI=1S/C11H16ClO2PS3/c1-3-13-15(16,14-4-2)18-9-17-11-7-5-10(12)6-8-11/h5-8H,3-4,9H2,1-2H3
- SMILES: Clc1ccc(SCSP(=S)(OCC)OCC)cc1

Properties
| Chemical formula | C_{11}H_{16}ClO_{2}PS_{3} |
| Molar mass | 342.85 g·mol^{−1} |
| Appearance | colorless to yellow-brown |
| Odor | mercaptan-like |
| Density | 1.271 g/cm^{3} |
| Melting point | unknown |
| Boiling point | 82 °C (180 °F; 355 K) 0.01 mmHg |
| Solubility in water | Insoluble |
| log P | 5.1 |

Hazards
- Occupational safety and health (OHS/OSH)
| Main hazards | Highly toxic |
- GHS labelling
| Pictograms | (GHS06: Toxic) (GHS08: Health hazard) (GHS09: Environmental hazard) |
| Signal word | Danger |
| Hazard statements | H301, H311, H361, H371, H372, H410 |
| Precautionary statements | P262, P264, P270, P273, P280, P301+P316, P302+P352, P316, P321, P330, P361+P364, P391, P405, P501 |
| Flash point | −18 °C (0 °F; 255 K) |
| Safety data sheet (SDS) | MSDS |
- Except where otherwise noted, data are given for materials in their standard state (at 25 °C [77 °F], 100 kPa). verify (what is ?) Infobox references

Carbophenothion also known as Stauffer R 1303 as for the manufacturer, Stauffer Chemical, is an organophosphorus chemical compound. It was used as a pesticide for citrus fruits under the name of Trithion. Carbophenothion was used as an insecticide and acaricide. Although not used anymore it is still a restricted use pesticide in the United States. The chemical is identified in the US as an extremely hazardous substance according to the Emergency Planning and Community Right-to-Know Act.

== Introduction and history ==
Carbophenothion is a highly toxic organophosphate insecticide and acaricide. Organophosphates are acetylcholinesterase inhibitors and disrupt the signal transduction at the cholinergic synapse. It is classified as Restricted Use Pesticide (RUP) by the Environmental Protection Agency (EPA). Carbophenothion is used in different brands like Trithion. This pesticide contains 80% carbophenothion as its only active ingredient. Because of the widespread use of those organophosphates in the nineties in the US, it was the most common cause of agricultural poisonings.

An example of the toxicity of carbophenothion was the poisoning of seven family members. The flour which they used in their food was probably contaminated with carbophenothion. The members became ill four to six hours after ingestion. The symptoms were nausea and vomiting, besides this one family member lost his consciousness. All the family members regained full strength after six days.

Since carbophenothion is highly toxic, it may only be used by certified applicators and the people directly supervised by them. A two-day safety waiting interval between the application is required to prevent unnecessary skin exposure. The compound is synthetically produced. The pure compound is a colorless to yellow-brown liquid, and is soluble in most industrial solvents. It is miscible with most organic compounds, like alcohols, ketones and esters.

In 1972 carbophenothion was evaluated at the Joint Meeting of Pesticide Residues (JMPR). During this meeting temporary tolerances were recommended for food, like several fruits, nuts and milk in the form of an acceptable daily intake (ADI). In 1975 these tolerances were re-evaluated and because the data on which the ADI's were based was not available the ADI's were withdrawn. The use of carbophenothion at that time did not indicate a need for additional maximum residue limits for crops, compared to the meeting in 1972. The latest meeting of the JMPR about this compound took place in 1980.

== Structure and properties ==
Carbophenothion is an aromatic organophosphate with a chloride attached. It appears at room temperature as a colorless to yellow-brown liquid. It has a mild mercaptan-like odor (rotten eggs). Its boiling point is 82 °C and its melting point is unknown. It is relatively stable to heat (below 82 °C).

Carbophenothion is lipophilic and therefore insoluble in water. It is non-corrosive but can be oxidized to phosphorothioate. Carbophenothion can be degraded in the atmosphere by a reaction with photochemically produced hydroxyl radicals. The half life of this reaction is estimated to be about two hours. This reaction does not occur very often, due to the low vapor pressure of carbophenothion (3.0 × 10^{−7} mm Hg at 20 °C). It is not susceptible to direct photolysis because it absorbs very little UV light and none above 310 nm. A more important fate may be hydrolysis.

== Synthesis ==
Carbophenothion can be synthesized in two steps from 4-chlorothiophenol, hydrogen chloride, formaldehyde and sodium O,O-diethyl dithiophosphate. First 4-chlorothiophenol can react with hydrogen chloride and formaldehyde to chloromethyl-4-chlorophenylsulfide. In the second step chloromethyl-4-chlorophenylsulfide reacts with sodium O,O-diethyl dithiophosphate to carbophenothion and sodium chloride. Both reactions occur spontaneously and are shown in the figure below.

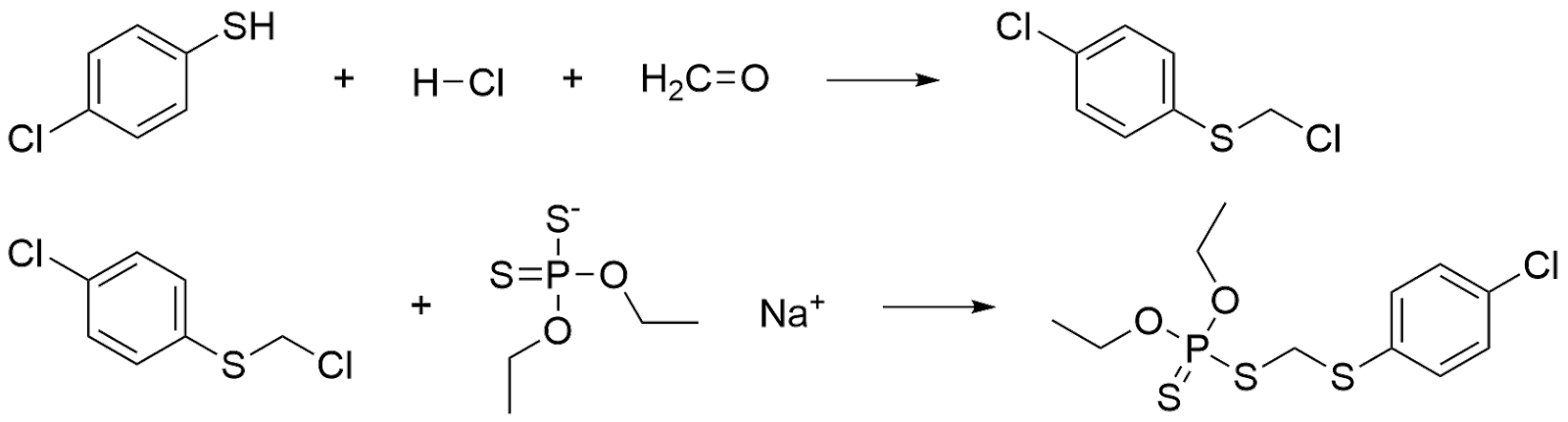

== Mechanism of action ==
Carbophenothion's mechanism of action is the same as its mechanism of toxicity, which acts through inhibition of cholinesterase, an essential enzyme in the production of neurotransmitters containing choline-based esters (for example acetylcholine). Inability to produce these neurotransmitters causes failure in neuron cell signal transduction. This has widespread effects (see adverse effects) and can be lethal.

Effectiveness of carbophenothion is enhanced by its very long residual activity and easy uptake by insects. Carbophenothion's mainly lipophilic character causes it to linger on the plants it is applied on and in the surrounding ground for extended periods of time. This makes it effective against eggs laid on treated plants. Another advantage of its lipophilic character is that it readily enters insects through sheer contact.

== Metabolism ==
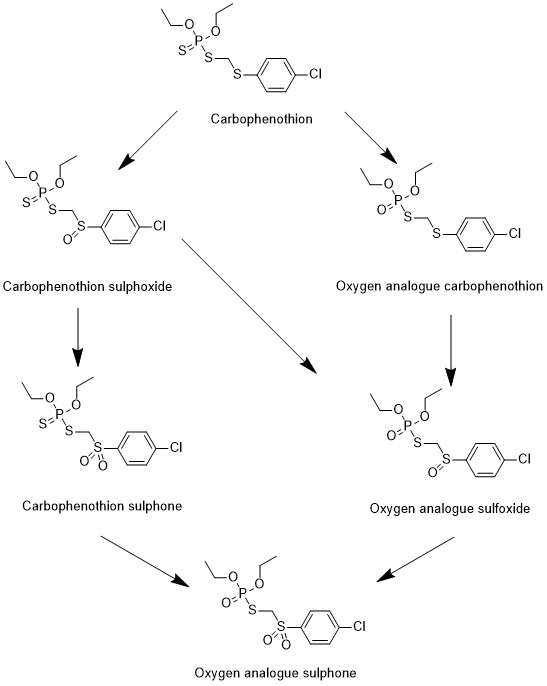
Five identified products resulting from oxidation of carbophenothion

The metabolism of carbophenothion in human beings, is comparable to the metabolism in mice, insects and plants. There is little data of the quantitative degradation of carbophenothion to oxidative and hydrolytic compounds in mammals. It was found that in the rat more than 75% of the administered dose was excreted in the urine within 24 hours. Carbophenothion is therefore estimated to be rapidly excreted in humans as well. The compound is most toxic when it is not metabolized. The acute toxicity of the majority of the metabolites of carbophenothion have been studied in rats. They are considerably less toxic and thus show that metabolism of carbophenothion does probably not involve bioactivation but rather detoxification. The two main products of this metabolism are sulfoxide and sulfone. Five oxidative products have been identified: the oxygen analogue of the carbophenothion, the sulfoxide and its oxygen analogue and finally sulfones and its oxygen analogue, all of which are depicted on the right.

The first major route of degradation of carbophenothion in rats is sulfoxidation, as displayed on the right. This product can be further transformed into 4-chlorobenzenesulfinic and 4-chlorobenzenesulfonic acid. A second major route involves the formation of 4-chlorothiophenol, which is further transformed via methylation and ring-hydroxylation to 4-Chloro-3-hydroxyphenyl methyl sulfone. This is then converted in approximately equal proportions to sulfate and glucuronide conjugates. Furthermore, there are metabolites that presumably arise from the cleavage of the P-S bond such as 4-chlorophenylsulfinylmethyl methyl sulfone. An overview of the metabolites and their occurrence as has been studied in rats can be found in the table below.

| Metabolite | Percentage in urine |
|---|---|
| 4-chlorobenzenesulfinic acid | 46.8% |
| 4-chloro-3-hydroxyphenylmethyl sulfone* | 23.9% |
| unidentified | 13.9% |
| 4-chlorobenzenesulfonic acid | 5.3% |
| 4-chlorobenzenemethiosulfuric acid | 3.0% |
| 4-chlorothio-phenyl-S-glucuronide | 2.8% |
| 4-chlorophenylsulfonylmethyl methyl sulfone | 1.9% |
| 4-chlorophenylmethyl sulfone | 1.7% |
| 4-chlorophenylsulfinylmethyl methyl sulfone | 0.7% |

One study on rats found that during 48 hours 66% of the administered carbophenothion was excreted in the urine and according to other experiments it takes approximately six days before complete excretion was achieved. Other studies say that even after 14 days there was a detectable level of the oxidation product present.

== Efficacy and adverse effects ==
=== Efficacy ===
Carbophenothion is used as an insecticide and acaricide, which main use is to protect citrus fruit, but it is also used to protect cotton against aphids (plant lice) and spider mites. Furthermore, it is used in combination with petroleum as well to function as a pesticide against numerous other pests on fruits, nuts, vegetables, sorghum, maize and others. Besides this it is used to control parasites on animals. Trithion, Garrathion and Lethox are three examples of pesticide brands that work with carbophenothion (Trithion is carbophenothion).

=== Adverse effects ===
==== Effects on humans ====
Humans exposed to carbophenothion show a wide variety of symptoms. It produces illness typical of cholinesterase inhibitors. Vomiting, nausea, diarrhea and excessive salivation are some common examples. When someone is exposed via inhalation, he or she may suffer from rhinorrhea and a tight feeling in the chest. As carbophenothion affects the activity of the nerves and the brain, symptoms like mental confusion, profound weakness and drowsiness are observed as well. When someone is exposed by absorption through the skin, they get muscle contractions as well. The only long-term effect found in humans so far is a reduction of the amount of red blood cells and increase of the adrenal gland. These last two phenomenons only have been found in females. Other studies on long-term effects only have been performed on animals and statements about possible extrapolations have not been made so far.

==== Effects on animals ====
Carbophenothion is not only very toxic to humans, but to other animals as well. For a lot of different animals the LD_{50}, the dose at which 50% of the animals died, is determined. In the table below the LD_{50} for certain types of birds and aquatic organisms are stated. It is highly toxic for crustaceans, marine organisms, amphibians, bees, wildlife as well, but no exact values are known.

| Type of animal | species | LD_{50} |
|---|---|---|
| Bird | European starling | 5.6 mg/kg |
| | Canada goose | 29–35 mg/kg |
| | Mallard ducks | 121 mg/kg |
| | Japanese quail | 56.8 mg/kg |
| Aquatic organism | Rainbow trout | 56 ppb |
| | bluegill sunfish | 13 ppb |
| | pink shrimp | 0.47 ppb |
| | sheepshead minnow | 17 ppb |

Long term effects were examined as well. Exposure of carbophenothion has a negative effect on reproductivity, at least in rats. When a dose of carbophenothion of 1–2 mg/kg/day was given to three following generations, this resulted in increased stillbirths and decreased rat pups’ survival. Furthermore, a study on 10-14 adult hens who were given a daily dose of carbophenothion for 24 days showed signs of cholinergic influence, e.g. ataxia, salivation and diarrhoea, loss of body weight and hampered egg production.

== Toxicity ==
Carbophenothion can be absorbed into the body by inhalation of its aerosol, through the skin and by ingestion. Exposure via ingestion is highly toxic, but absorption through the skin is nearly as toxic. Acute toxicity happens as most effects occur soon after uptake in the body. Carbophenothion affects the nervous system by inhibiting cholinesterase. There are no signs of chronic or carcinogenic effects.

The EPA has classified carbophenothion as Category I - highly toxic. The toxicity in man has not yet been studied very well. There has been one study where five people were administered carbophenothion 0.8 mg/kg/day for 30 days. There were no effects reported on plasma or red blood cell cholinesterase activity. These results were insufficient to determine the ADI. Later on, these results were even questioned because of an experiment with dogs which proved that a dose of 0.125 mg/kg/day already had effects. The estimate of temporary ADI for man is now set at 0 - 0.005 mg/kg. This is based on the NOAEL of rats of 5 ppm in the diet equivalent to 0.25 mg/kg/day. The estimated fatal oral dose is 0.6 g for a 150 lb. (70 kg) person. The LD_{50} for humans is unknown.
