= Oxyfluorfen =

Names
- IUPAC name 2-chloro-1-(3-ethoxy-4-nitrophenoxy)-4-(trifluoromethyl)benzene
- Other names Oxyfluorfen; Oxyfluorofen; 2-chloro-1-(3-ethoxy-4-nitrophenoxy)-4-trifluoromethylbenzene; 2-chloro-α,α,α-trifluoro-p-tolyl-3-ethoxy-4-nitrophenyl ether; Galigan; Goal; Goldate; Oxyfluorfene; Oxygold; Zoomer

Identifiers
CAS Number	42874-03-3
3D model (JSmol)	Interactive image
ChEBI	CHEBI:82029
ChEMBL	ChEMBL1871400
ChemSpider	35974
ECHA InfoCard	100.050.876
EC Number	255-983-0
KEGG	C18881
PubChem CID	39327
UNII	46GY4Y6567
CompTox Dashboard (EPA)	DTXSID7024241
- InChI: InChI=1S/C15H11ClF3NO4/c1-2-23-14-8-10(4-5-12(14)20(21)22)24-13-6-3-9(7-11(13)16)15(17,18)19/h3-8H,2H2,1H3 Key: OQMBBFQZGJFLBU-UHFFFAOYSA-N
- SMILES: CCOC1=C(C=CC(=C1)OC2=C(C=C(C=C2)C(F)(F)F)Cl)[N+](=O)[O-]

Properties
Chemical formula	C_{15}H_{11}ClF_{3}NO_{4}
Molar mass	361.702 g/mol
Appearance	Deep red/yellow brown solid
Melting point	65–80°C
Boiling point	250–300°C
Solubility in water	0.1 ppm
Vapor pressure	2×10^{−6} mmHg

Hazards
- GHS labelling
Pictograms	(GHS09: Environmental hazard)
Signal word	Warning
Hazard statements	H410
- Lethal dose or concentration (LD, LC)
LD_{50} (median dose)	5 g/kg (rat, oral)
- Except where otherwise noted, data are given for materials in their standard state (at 25 °C [77 °F], 100 kPa). Infobox references

Oxyfluorfen is a chemical compound used as an herbicide. It is manufactured by Dow AgroSciences, Adama Agricultural Solutions and 4Farmers under the trade names Goal, Galigan, and Oxyfluorfen 240. Oxyfluorfen is used to control broadleaf and grassy weeds in a variety of nut, tree fruit, vine, and field crops, especially wine grapes and almonds. It is also used for residential weed control. It was first registered in the USA by Rohm and Hass, 1979, though their experiments started in 1974. It has since been registered in Australia, (Note: Pendimethalin is registered in Australia for use on brassica crops (broccoli, cabbages, cauliflower), onion, tobacco, pyrethrum, and various kinds of tree fruit, nuts and vines: almonds, apples, apricots, macadamias, peaches, pears, pecans, plums, walnuts, duboisia, tropical and subtropical fruit, avocado, kiwi fruit, longan, lychees, mango, passionfruit, pawpaw, rambutan.) South Africa (Note: Oxyfluorfen's South African registration is for use on citrus and garlic.) and India.

== Mode of action ==
Oxyfluorfen is a diphenyl ether herbicide and acts via inhibition of protoporphyrinogen oxidase, (destroying chlorophyll production and cell membranes), making its HRAC resistance class Group G (Aus), Group E (Global) and 14 (numerical).

Oxyfluorfen suffers from poor translocation, despite rapid shoot and foliar uptake. Desiccation in affected weeds begins in hours, with necrosis and death following in days.

== Toxicity ==
Oxyfluorfen has low acute oral, dermal, and inhalation toxicity in humans. The primary toxic effects are in the liver and alterations in blood parameters (anemia). It is classified as a possible human carcinogen. Its LD_{50} is over 5000 mg/kg, which is not toxic.

Impurities in oxyfuorfen might have mutagenic effects: EPA testing found 72.5% purity oxyfluorfen technical caused repairable DNA damage to salmonella via frameshift mutation, however 99.7% oxyfluorfen had no effect. Another study with 99% oxyfluorfen found no mutagenic effect. The minimum technical grade purity sold now is 97%.

EPA testing showed oxyfluorfen is not teratogenic. Dogs fed oxyfluorfen for two years in a chronic toxicity trial developed discoloured liver cells, increased liver weight, alkaline phosphatase, renal tube vacuolisation, and thyroiditis.

In 1977, it was found that oxyfluorfen batches were contaminated with perchloroethylene, a potential carcinogen, the levels of which were reduced more than 8 fold by 1981.

== Environmental impact ==
Oxyfluorfen is classified as an environmental hazard under the GHS due to being "very toxic to aquatic life with long lasting effects".

Oxyfluorfen is toxic to plants, invertebrates, and fish. Birds and mammals may also experience subchronic and chronic effects from oxyfluorfen. It is persistent in soil and has been shown to drift from application sites to nearby areas, though it leaches very little, due to the low water-solubility and affinity for soil. It can contaminate surface water through spray drift and runoff. Oxyflurofen's waterborne LC_{50} for trout is less than 0.5 mg/L.

A 1980 computer simulation predicts oxyfluorfen's aquatic half-life to be 127 days.

== Herbicide application ==
Oxyfluorfen is used in the USA and Australia, at rates of up to 1500 g/Ha. It was estimated in 1981 that 8% of US soy, 1.6% of corn, and 50–90% of fruit trees were treated with "Goal 2E" (23.5% oxyfluorfen). Oxyfluorfen requires no rainfall, irrigation nor soil incorporation after application; excessive rainfall immediately after spraying can splash it onto crop leaves, causing contact burning.

Application rates are typically 0.36 kg/Ha to 1.92 kg/Ha (Australia, 2024), active ingredient, although it can be used as an 18 g/Ha spike with a standard rate of glyphosate.

Oxyfluorfen provides long residual control of emerging weeds for up to 3 months after application, in one case, even after less than 10 ppb remained in soil.

=== Crops applied to ===
It has been used on crops of tree fruit, nuts, onion, tobacco, vines, almonds, apples, apricots, grapevine, macadamias, peaches, pears, pecans, plums, walnuts, Duboisia, Avocado, custard apple, kiwi fruit, longan, lychees, mango, passionfruit, pawpaw, rambutan, brassica crops, broccoli, cabbages, cauliflower, pyrethrum and (before sowing) cotton or winter cereals.

=== Weeds Controlled ===
Oxyfluorfen controls broadleaf weeds: black nightshade, lambsquarters, ragweed, cutleaf groundcherry, jimsonweed, smartweed, prickly sida, pigweed, velvetleaf and witchweed, suppressing cocklebur and morning glory. It controls grasses: barnyard grass, fall panicum, giant foxtail, large crabgrass, and suppresses broadleaf signalgrass, seedling johnsongrass and yellow foxtail. Black nightshade was particularly bothersome for soy farmers; its tough stems could clog up harvesters, and its poisonous berries are hard to separate from the crop. Witchweed infestations can reduce corn yields by up to 90%.

=== Tradenames ===
It has been sold under the tradenames "Oxyfluorfen 240" and "Goal 2E".

== Links ==
- Oxyfluorfen in the Pesticide Properties DataBase (PPDB)
