= 4,4'-Dichlorobenzophenone =

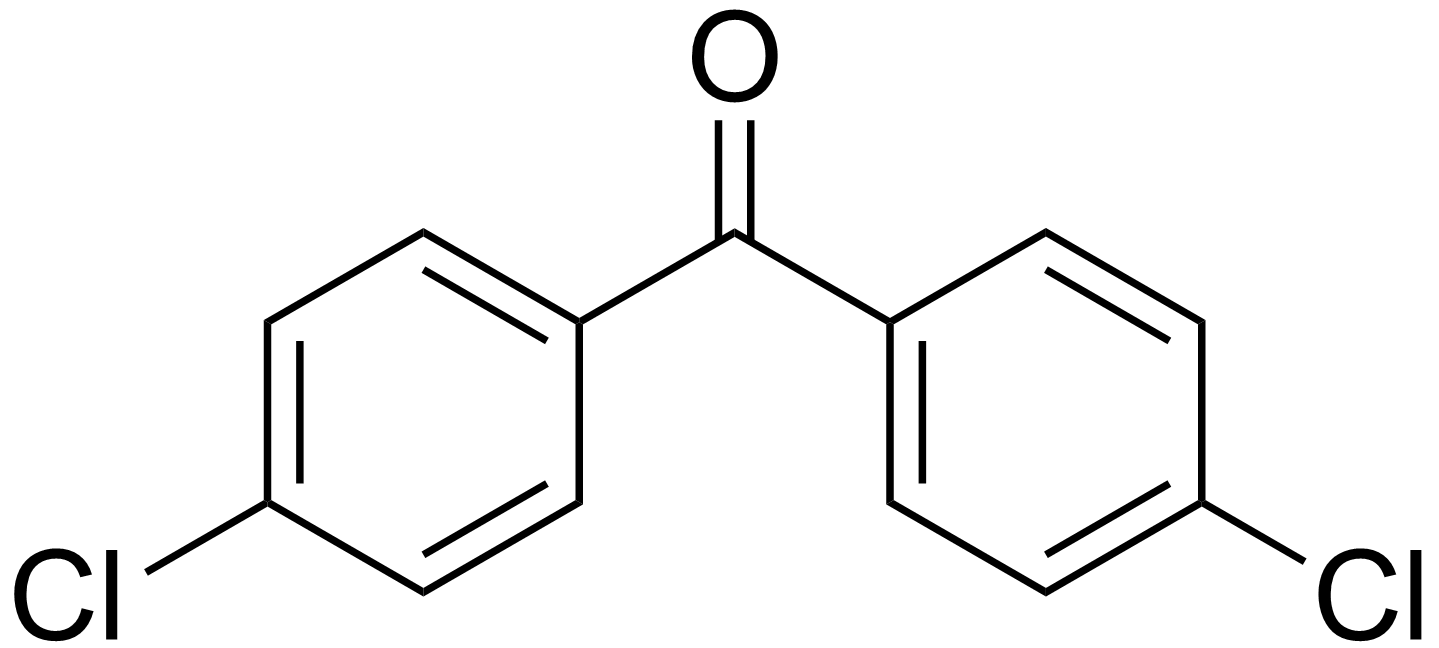

Names
- Preferred IUPAC name Bis(4-chlorophenyl)methanone

Identifiers
CAS Number	90-98-2
3D model (JSmol)	Interactive image
ChEBI	CHEBI:27519
ChEMBL	ChEMBL1870191
ChemSpider	6767
ECHA InfoCard	100.001.846
EC Number	202-030-1
KEGG	C06643
PubChem CID	7034
UNII	3MTL0YC2Q5
CompTox Dashboard (EPA)	DTXSID3037626
- InChI: InChI=1S/C13H8Cl2O/c14-11-5-1-9(2-6-11)13(16)10-3-7-12(15)8-4-10/h1-8H Key: OKISUZLXOYGIFP-UHFFFAOYSA-N; InChI=1/C13H8Cl2O/c14-11-5-1-9(2-6-11)13(16)10-3-7-12(15)8-4-10/h1-8H Key: OKISUZLXOYGIFP-UHFFFAOYAC
- SMILES: O=C(c1ccc(Cl)cc1)c2ccc(Cl)cc2

Properties
Chemical formula	C_{13}H_{8}Cl_{2}O
Molar mass	251.11 g/mol
Melting point	144 to 147 °C (291 to 297 °F; 417 to 420 K)
Boiling point	353 °C (667 °F; 626 K)

Hazards
- GHS labelling
Pictograms	(GHS07: Exclamation mark)
Signal word	Warning
Hazard statements	H302
Precautionary statements	P264, P270, P301+P312, P330, P501
- Except where otherwise noted, data are given for materials in their standard state (at 25 °C [77 °F], 100 kPa). verify (what is ?) Infobox references

4,4’-Dichlorobenzophenone is an organic compound with the formula of (ClC_{6}H_{4})_{2}CO.

== Synthesis ==
4,4’-Dichlorobenzophenone is prepared by the acylation of chlorobenzene with 4-chlorobenzoyl chloride. The conversion is typically conducted in the presence of an aluminium chloride catalyst in a petroleum ether solvent.

ClC_{6}H_{5}C(O)Cl + C_{6}H_{5}Cl → (ClC_{6}H_{4})_{2}CO + HCl
