= Leptophos =

Chemical compound (O-(4-bromo-2,5-dichlorophenyl)

- Chemical structure of leptophos

Names
- Preferred IUPAC name O-(4-Bromo-2,5-dichlorophenyl) O-methyl phenylphosphonothioate

Identifiers
CAS Number	21609-90-5
3D model (JSmol)	Interactive image
ChEBI	CHEBI:82137
ChemSpider	28496
ECHA InfoCard	100.040.415
EC Number	244-472-8
KEGG	C19003
PubChem CID	30709
UNII	C45E8FUG3Z
UN number	3464 3018
CompTox Dashboard (EPA)	DTXSID3040279
- InChI: InChI=1S/C13H10BrCl2O2PS/c1-17-19(20,9-5-3-2-4-6-9)18-13-8-11(15)10(14)7-12(13)16/h2-8H,1H3 Key: CVRALZAYCYJELZ-UHFFFAOYSA-N
- SMILES: c1([P@@](Oc2c(cc(Br)c(c2)Cl)Cl)(OC)=S)ccccc1

Properties
Chemical formula	C_{13}H_{10}BrCl_{2}O_{2}PS
Molar mass	412.06 g·mol^{−1}
Appearance	White crystalline solid
Density	1.53 g/cm^{3}
Melting point	70 °C (158 °F; 343 K)
Boiling point	180 °C (356 °F; 453 K) (decomposes)
Solubility in water	0.0047 mg/l
log P	6.31
Vapor pressure	2.3E-8 mm Hg

Hazards
- GHS labelling
Pictograms	(GHS06: Toxic) (GHS08: Health hazard) (GHS09: Environmental hazard)
Signal word	Danger
Hazard statements	H301, H312, H370, H410
Precautionary statements	P260, P264, P270, P273, P280, P301+P310, P302+P352, P307+P311, P312, P321, P322, P330, P363, P405, P501
- Lethal dose or concentration (LD, LC)
LD_{50} (median dose)	Rat 135 mg/kg (IP) Rat 19 mg/kg (oral); Rat 44 mg/kg (skin)
- Except where otherwise noted, data are given for materials in their standard state (at 25 °C [77 °F], 100 kPa). verify (what is ?) Infobox references

Leptophos (O-(4-bromo-2,5-dichlorophenyl) O-methyl phenylphosphonothioate) belongs to the organophosphates and at room temperature it is a stable white solid. It is also known as Phosvel, Abar and Vcs 506. Leptophos was primarily used as a pesticide and fungicide for rice, cotton, fruit, and vegetables until its use was discontinued in 1975 in the United States, but still sold in South-Eastern Asia in 1981.

Leptophos was first discovered to be toxic in 1974 when more than 1000 water buffaloes died after exposure to leptophos in Egypt. In response to this event, the effect of leptophos was investigated on chickens, mice, and sheep.

== History ==
In Egypt, leptophos used on cotton in 1971 caused the death of more than 1000 water buffaloes and a number of farmers. The compound was never registered for domestic use by the Environmental Protection Agency (EPA) but was exported from the U.S. to at least 30 countries. Leptophos was discontinued for use in late 1975 due to its high toxicity. Between 1971 and 1976 the U.S. used $4 million in United States Agency for International Development funds to ship 13.9 million pounds of leptophos and other banned pesticides to 50 countries. In 1975 U.S. companies alone, exported over 3 million pounds of leptophos.

In 1976, workers in the Velsicol's chemical plant in Bayport, Texas, reported serious neurological symptoms, the Phosvel zombies, and filed a lawsuit against the company. When Colombia banned leptophos in 1977, the American company Velsicol stopped the production and shipped its Colombian stocks to El Salvador. No prohibitions exist in El Salvador. In other instances leptophos was imported to Costa Rica via Mexico and Panama, and until 1981 leptophos was being sold in Indonesia.

== Structure and reactivity ==
It is stable at normal temperatures; at 180 degrees Celsius 85 percent of the material is decomposed in 5 hours, and at 208 degrees Celsius it decomposes in 2 hours. The main product of thermal decomposition is the S-methyl isomer O-(4-bromo-2,5-chlorophenyl) S-methyl phenylphosphonothioate. Leptophos is hydrolyzed slowly under alkaline conditions. The material is stable toward acid.

In the laboratory, when irradiated with high intensity UV light in the presence of a strong UV sensitizer, leptophos is rapidly converted first to O-(2,5-dichlorophenyl) O-methylphenyl-phosphonothioate, referred to as the dichloro-photoproduct, and then to a material with the empirical formula C_{13}H_{10}ClO_{2}PS (tentatively identified as 3-chloro-6-methoxydibenz [1,2]-oxaphosphorin-6-thione or O-methyl-O,P-(4-chlorobiphenyl-2,6-ylene) phosphonothioate and referred to as the monochloro-photoproduct. UV light increases the rate of hydrolysis under field conditions.

== Synthesis ==
There are multiple ways to synthesize leptophos. One of the methods that is possible for doing that is to let O-methyl phenylthiophosponyl chloride react with 4-bromo-2,5-dichlorophenol:

C_{7}H_{8}ClOPS + C_{6}H_{3}BrCl_{2}O → C_{13}H_{10}BrCl_{2}O_{2}PS + HCl.

It is also possible to produce it by the reaction of phenylphosphonothioic dichloride with methanol and trimethylamine in toluene follow by a reaction with potassium 4-bromo-2,5-dichlorophenoxide.

== Toxicodynamics ==
Leptophos is an irreversible inhibitor of cholinesterases in vitro. The inhibitory activity of leptophos seems to be related to hydrophobic interactions involving lipophilic groups as phenyl and 4-bromo-2,5-dichlorophenyl and the ability of these groups to donate electrons to firm a complex with the enzyme.

An example of a cholinesterase is the acetylcholinesterase (AChE). This cholinesterase converts the neurotransmitter acetylcholine into the inactive metabolites choline and acetate. Acetylcholine receptors are of two types:

1. A fast-acting ion-channel controlled receptor.
2. A slow-acting receptor that acts through a G-protein (guanine nucleotide-binding protein) that stimulates second-messengers (often cyclic AMP) to indirectly open ion-channels.

Direct ion-channel controlling receptors can respond in microseconds, whereas indirect second-messenger controlling receptors take milliseconds to produce a response.

When leptophos binds to the AChE, the acetylcholine does not get inactivated. This interferes with a normal signal transfer. This means that a nerve signal can't get transmitted in the way it should be and leads to a broad range of clinical symptoms.

== Metabolism ==
The main metabolic pathway in of leptophos in rats is an enzymatic hydrolysis of the compound. The main Metabolites are phosphonic acid, 4-bromo-2,3-dichlorophenol, O-methyl O-hydrogen phenylphosphonothioate and methyl hydrogen phenylphosphonate. It is unsure which of the two possible pathways is used to get phosphonic acid.

== Absorption and excretion ==
Following oral administration, leptophos is excreted in urine and faeces as several components. Several components found in urine included: O-methyl phenyl phosphonate (a major component in raturine), O-methyl phenyl phosphonothioic acid (a major component in miceurine), leptophos phenol, and phenyl phosphonic acid. Interspecies differences in metabolism can explain the difference in major metabolites is mice and rats.

Studies in plants indicated that leptophos was slowly absorbed following a foliar treatment with the major quantity found to remain on the leaf surface. Studies with several leaf types (bean - lettuce) showed that residues diminished rapidly on both types of surfaces. The primary mechanism by which leptophos was lost was presumed to be by volatilization. Qualitatively, leptophos was metabolized to products similar to those found with the mouse. Phenyl phosphonate derivatives were also recovered from plant surfaces.

== Indications ==
Leptophos, as well as every other organophosphate, causes acetylcholinesterase inhibition. Because of this inhibition the following symptoms were observed.

Skin	Skin rash, itching, burning or prickling of the skin, tingling or numbness of hands and the face, muscular twitching or cramps in the face, neck and limbs. A positive score on three or more symptoms was used as a cut off point for further analysis.
Respiratory	Chest pain, shortness of breath, difficulties with breathing, wheezing, runny nose, irritation of the throat and cough. If the patient showed three or more of these symptoms they were considered having respiratory symptoms.
Systemic	Excessive sweating, nausea, vomiting, diarrhea, excessive salivation, abdominal pain, burning on urination and poor appetite. A positive score on three or more symptoms was used as a cut off point for further analysis.
Eye	Lacrimation and irritation of the eyes. If both symptoms were observed the patient was considered to have eye problems due to the poisoning.
CNS	Trembling hands difficulty in seeing, irritability, forgetfulness, restlessness and difficulties falling asleep. A positive score on five or more of the 14 symptoms was used as a cut off point for further analysis.

== Toxicity ==
Due to the severe toxicity of leptophos, the lethal doses (LD) are determined in animal tests. Toxicity differs between species and between exposure through the skin, inhalation and the gastrointestinal track (table).

Organism	Test Type	Route	Reported Dose	Effect	Source
Cat	LDLo	Skin	2250 mg/kg	Ataxia, Changes in Salivary glands, Hypermotility, Diarrhea.	National Technical Information Service. Vol. OTS0543229,
Chicken	LD	Intravenous	>30 mg/kg	Changes in serum composition	Environmental Health and Preventive Medicine.
Chicken	LD_{50}	Oral	4700 mg/kg	Ataxia, Flaccid paralysis without anesthesia and changes in motor activity.	Experientia. Vol. 30, Pg. 63, 1974.
Mammal (species unspecified)	LD_{50}	Skin	50 mg/kg		Gigiena Truda i Professional'nye Zabolevaniya. Labor Hygiene and Occupational Diseases. Vol. 21(7), Pg. 34, 1977.
Mouse	LD_{50}	Oral	65 mg/kg		
Mouse	LD_{50}	Subcutaneous	120 mg/kg		Oyo Yakuri. Pharmacometrics. Vol. 3, Pg. 74, 1969.
Rabbit	LD_{50}	Oral	124 mg/kg	Hemorrhage, Hypermotility, Diarrhea and Lacrimation eyes.	Journal Europeen de Toxicologie. Vol. 6, Pg. 70, 1973.
Rabbit	LD_{50}	Skin	800 mg/kg		Journal Europeen de Toxicologie. Vol. 6, Pg. 70, 1973.
Rat	LD_{50}	Intravenous	135 mg/kg	Hemorrhage, Hypermotility, Diarrhea and Lacrimation eyes.	Oyo Yakuri. Pharmacometrics. Vol. 22, Pg. 373, 1981.
Rat	LD_{50}	Oral	19 mg/kg		Fundamental and Applied Toxicology. Vol. 7, Pg. 299, 1986.
Rat	LD_{50}	Skin	44 mg/kg		Fundamental and Applied Toxicology. Vol. 7, Pg. 299, 1986.
