= Phorate =

Names
- Preferred IUPAC name O,O-Diethyl S-[(ethylsulfanyl)methyl] phosphorodithioate
- Other names Thimet (trademark); 3911 (trademark)

Identifiers
CAS Number	298-02-2
3D model (JSmol)	Interactive image
ChEBI	CHEBI:38764
ChEMBL	ChEMBL510014
ChemSpider	4626
ECHA InfoCard	100.005.503
PubChem CID	4790
UNII	3W54X3W9IV
CompTox Dashboard (EPA)	DTXSID4032459
- InChI: InChI=1S/C7H17O2PS3/c1-4-8-10(11,9-5-2)13-7-12-6-3/h4-7H2,1-3H3 Key: BULVZWIRKLYCBC-UHFFFAOYSA-N; InChI=1/C7H17O2PS3/c1-4-8-10(11,9-5-2)13-7-12-6-3/h4-7H2,1-3H3 Key: BULVZWIRKLYCBC-UHFFFAOYAA
- SMILES: S=P(OCC)(SCSCC)OCC

Properties
Chemical formula	C_{7}H_{17}O_{2}PS_{3}
Molar mass	260.36 g·mol^{−1}
Appearance	Colorless liquid
Odor	Skunk-like
Density	1.16 g/mL
Melting point	−43 °C; −45 °F; 230 K
Boiling point	118-120°C (2.0 mm Hg)
Solubility in water	0.005% (20°C)
Vapor pressure	0.0008 mmHg (20°C)

Hazards
Flash point	160 °C; 320 °F; 433 K (open cup)
- NIOSH (US health exposure limits)
PEL (Permissible)	none
REL (Recommended)	TWA 0.05 mg/m^{3} ST 0.2 mg/m^{3} [skin]
IDLH (Immediate danger)	N.D.
- Except where otherwise noted, data are given for materials in their standard state (at 25 °C [77 °F], 100 kPa). verify (what is ?) Infobox references

Phorate is an organophosphate used as an insecticide and acaricide.

== Overview ==
At normal conditions, it is a pale yellow mobile liquid poorly soluble in water but readily soluble in organic solvents. It is relatively stable and hydrolyses only at very acidic or basic conditions. It is very toxic both for target organisms and for mammals including humans. It inhibits acetylcholinesterase and butyrylcholinesterase.

Phorate is most commonly applied in granular form. It is non-biocumulative and has no residual action. But some metabolites may persist in soil. It also damages some seeds.

== Toxicity ==
Phorate (Thimate) is absorbed readily through all ways. Its toxicity is high. Oral LD_{50} to rats is 1.1 – 3.2 mg/kg, to mice 3.5 – 6.5 mg/kg (technical phorate). Similar values has been found out to birds.
