= Dichlorvos =

Insect killing chemical, organophosphate

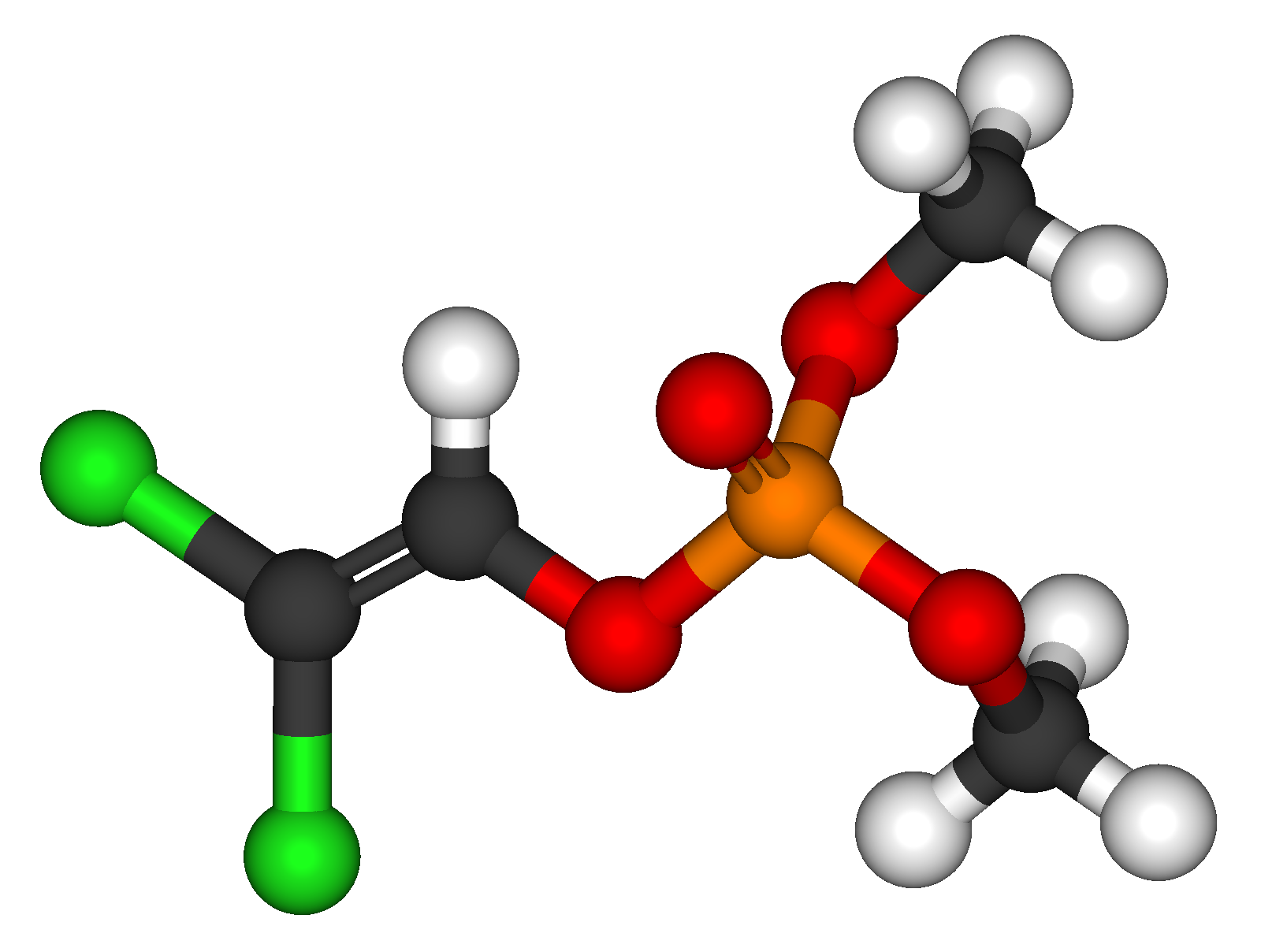

Names
- IUPAC name 2,2-Dichlorovinyl dimethyl phosphate
- Other names DDVP, Vapona

Identifiers
CAS Number	62-73-7
3D model (JSmol)	Interactive image
ChEBI	CHEBI:34690
ChEMBL	ChEMBL167911
ChemSpider	2931
ECHA InfoCard	100.000.498
KEGG	D03791
PubChem CID	3039
UNII	7U370BPS14
CompTox Dashboard (EPA)	DTXSID5020449
- InChI: InChI=1S/C4H7Cl2O4P/c1-8-11(7,9-2)10-3-4(5)6/h3H,1-2H3 Key: OEBRKCOSUFCWJD-UHFFFAOYSA-N; InChI=1S/2ClH.2H3N.Pt/h2*1H;2*1H3;/q;;;;+2/p-2 Key: LXZZYRPGZAFOLE-UHFFFAOYSA-L
- SMILES: O=P(O\C=C(/Cl)Cl)(OC)OC

Properties
Chemical formula	C_{4}H_{7}Cl_{2}O_{4}P
Molar mass	220.97 g·mol^{−1}
- Except where otherwise noted, data are given for materials in their standard state (at 25 °C [77 °F], 100 kPa). Infobox references

Dichlorvos (2,2-dichlorovinyl dimethyl phosphate, commonly abbreviated as an DDVP) is an organophosphate widely used as an insecticide to control household pests, in public health, and protecting stored products from insects. The compound has been commercially available since 1961. It has become controversial because of its prevalence in urban waterways and the fact that its toxicity extends well beyond insects. Since 1988, dichlorvos cannot be used as a plant protection product in the EU.

== Use ==
Dichlorvos is effective against mushroom flies, aphids, spider mites, caterpillars, thrips, and whiteflies in greenhouses and in outdoor crops. It is also used in the milling and grain handling industries and to treat a variety of parasitic worm infections in animals and humans. It is fed to livestock to control botfly larvae in manure. It acts against insects as both a contact poison and an ingested poison. It is available as an aerosol and soluble concentrate. It is also used in pet flea collars and "no-pest strips" in the form of a pesticide-impregnated plastic; this material has been available to households since 1964 and has been the source of some concern, partly due to misuse.

== Properties ==
Dichlorvos is a colourless liquid with aromatic odour. Its density is 1.425 g/cm^{3} (23.35 g/in^{3}) at 25 °C (77 °F), melting point below −60 °C (−76 °F) and a boiling point of 140 °C (284 °F) at 27 hPa. Dichlorvos is soluble in water.

== Mechanism of action ==
Dichlorvos, like other organophosphate insecticides, inhibits acetylcholinesterase, associated with the nervous systems of insects. Evidence for other modes of action, applicable to higher animals, have been presented. It is said to damage DNA of insects.

== Regulation ==
The United States Environmental Protection Agency has reviewed the safety data of dichlorvos several times. In 1995 a voluntary agreement was reached with the supplier, Amvac Chemical Corporation, which restricted the use of dichlorvos in many, but not all, domestic uses, all aerial applications, and other uses. Additional voluntary cancellations were implemented in 2006, 2008, and 2010. Major concerns focus on acute and chronic toxicity and the fact that this pesticide is prevalent in urban waterways. A 2010 study found that each 10-fold increase in urinary concentration of organophosphate metabolites was associated with a 55% to 72% increase in the odds of ADHD in children.

Between 2000 and 2013, thirty-one cases of acute dichlorvos pest strip-related illness were reported to the National Institute for Occupational Safety and Health (NIOSH) sentinel system. 65% of the 31 cases involved DDVP misuse contrary to instructions and safety labels. Common violations included pest strip use in occupied, poorly-ventilated living areas (e.g., kitchens, bedrooms), lack of skin protection, cutting and tearing strips, and using a heater and fan to accelerate vapor dissemination from strips.

== Production ==
Dichlorvos can be produced by dehydrochlorinating trichlorfon in an aqueous alkali at 40-50 °C. It is also produced by the reaction of trimethyl phosphate and chloral. As of 1990, it was produced in Argentina, Brazil, Germany, India, Israel, Japan, the Republic of Korea, Mexico, the USA, Switzerland, Sweden, Spain, and the Netherlands.

== Environment ==
Dichlorvos enters the air, water, and soil when it is used and manufactured. It also can enter the environment when waste containing dichlorvos is disposed of in landfills. Dichlorvos is soluble in water, so it dissolves when it enters a body of water. Dichlorvos evaporates into the air easily, but is broken down by water vapor such as humidity. It does not bind to soil, but dichlorvos is broken down slower in soil than in the air. The broken down products are far less harmful than dichlorvos is. Dichlorvos is not stored in plants, animals, or humans.

== Safety ==
People can be exposed to dichlorvos in the workplace by breathing it in, skin absorption, swallowing it, and eye contact. The Occupational Safety and Health Administration (OSHA) has set the legal limit (permissible exposure limit) for dichlorvos exposure in the workplace as 1 mg/m^{3} over an 8-hour workday. The National Institute for Occupational Safety and Health (NIOSH) has set a recommended exposure limit (REL) of 1 mg/m^{3} over an 8-hour workday. At levels of 100 mg/m^{3}, dichlorvos is immediately dangerous to life or health (IDLH).

=== Treatment Technology ===
Different physicochemical methods have been developed for the removal of DDVP from contaminated environments, and microbial degradation is regarded as a promising method to solve several harmful residuals caused by DDVP. The biodegradation mechanism of many OPs has been studied deeply, especially for the methyl parathion, whose degradation genes and enzymes were cloned and purified. There is a need to select more useful strains, since only a few bacteria have been studied thoroughly in relation to the functional enzymes and genes.

== Effects on humans ==
Since it is an acetylcholinesterase inhibitor, symptoms of dichlorvos exposure include weakness, headache, tightness in chest, blurred vision, salivation, sweating, nausea, vomiting, diarrhea, abdominal cramps, eye and skin irritation, miosis (pupil constriction), eye pain, runny nose, wheezing, laryngospasm, cyanosis, anorexia, muscle fasciculation, paralysis, dizziness, ataxia, convulsions, hypotension (low blood pressure), and cardiac arrhythmias.

It is also known to affect DNA replication in bacteria.

Lethal concentration (LC_{50}) data
Dose	Organism	Time
15 mg/m^{3}	rat	4 h
13 mg/m^{3}	mouse	4 h

Lethal dose (LD_{50}) data
Dose	Organism	Route
100 mg/kg	dog	oral
61 mg/kg	mouse	oral
10 mg/kg	rabbit	oral
17 mg/kg	rat	oral

Acute Effects

Dichlorvos is irritating to the skin. The substance may affect the nervous system by inhibiting cholinesterase. The effects of exposure may be delayed but a high level could be fatal. Medical observation is indicated

Tests involving acute exposure of rats, mice, and rabbits have demonstrated that dichlorvos has high to extremely acute toxicity from oral or dermal exposure and extremely acute toxicity from inhalation

Long-Term Effects

Prolonged contact with skin may cause dermatitis and skin sensitization. If drinking water contaminated by dichlorvos is ingested long-term it may cause oral cancer.

Reproductive/Developmental Effects

There is no information available on the reproductive or developmental effects of dichlorvos in humans. In studies conducted with rat models, birth defects in fetal rats were observed. Mouse models also demonstrated sperm abnormalities. However, studies with other animal subjects found no birth defects.

== Trivia ==
Dichlorvos is mentioned in John Brunner's science fiction novel The Sheep Look Up. One of the book's many vignettes tells of a woman who nearly dies, having taken barbiturates and gone to sleep in a closed room where a fly-killing strip doused with the material was placed.

== See also ==
- Metrifonate (converts into dichlorvos)
- Naled (can convert into dichlorvos)
