= Dicrotophos =

Names
- Preferred IUPAC name (2E)-4-(Dimethylamino)-4-oxobut-2-en-2-yl dimethyl phosphate
- Other names Bidrin, Carbicron, 2-Dimethyl-cis-2-dimethylcarbamoyl-1-methylvinylphosphate

Identifiers
CAS Number	141-66-2
3D model (JSmol)	Interactive image
ChEBI	CHEBI:38658
ChEMBL	ChEMBL1876467
ChemSpider	4522051
ECHA InfoCard	100.004.996
EC Number	205-494-3
KEGG	C18656
PubChem CID	5371560
UNII	B541I65WBL
CompTox Dashboard (EPA)	DTXSID9023914
- InChI: InChI=1S/C8H16NO5P/c1-7(6-8(10)9(2)3)14-15(11,12-4)13-5/h6H,1-5H3/b7-6+ Key: VEENJGZXVHKXNB-VOTSOKGWSA-N; InChI=1/C8H16NO5P/c1-7(6-8(10)9(2)3)14-15(11,12-4)13-5/h6H,1-5H3/b7-6+ Key: VEENJGZXVHKXNB-VOTSOKGWBK
- SMILES: C/C(=C\C(=O)N(C)C)/OP(=O)(OC)OC

Properties
Chemical formula	C_{8}H_{16}NO_{5}P
Molar mass	237.190 g/mol
Appearance	Yellow-brown liquid with a mild, ester odor
Density	1.22 g/mL
Boiling point	400 °C (752 °F; 673 K)
Solubility in water	miscible
Vapor pressure	0.0001 mmHg

Hazards
- Occupational safety and health (OHS/OSH)
Main hazards	Toxic
Flash point	> 93.3°C
- NIOSH (US health exposure limits)
PEL (Permissible)	none
REL (Recommended)	TWA 0.25 mg/m^{3} [skin]
IDLH (Immediate danger)	N.D.
- Except where otherwise noted, data are given for materials in their standard state (at 25 °C [77 °F], 100 kPa). verify (what is ?) Infobox references

Dicrotophos is an organophosphate acetylcholinesterase inhibitor used as an insecticide. Some common brand names for dicrotophos include Bidrin, Carbicron, Diapadrin, Dicron and Ektafos.
