= EPN (insecticide) =

Names
- Preferred IUPAC name O-Ethyl O-(4-nitrophenyl) phenylphosphonothioate
- Other names Ethyl p-nitrophenyl thionobenzenephosphonate, Ethyl p-nitrophenyl benzenethionophosphonate

Identifiers
CAS Number	2104-64-5
3D model (JSmol)	Interactive image
ChemSpider	15571
ECHA InfoCard	100.016.615
PubChem CID	16421
UNII	9Y6HP0HYA8
CompTox Dashboard (EPA)	DTXSID7022174
- InChI: InChI=1S/C14H14NO4PS/c1-2-18-20(21,14-6-4-3-5-7-14)19-13-10-8-12(9-11-13)15(16)17/h3-11H,2H2,1H3 Key: AIGRXSNSLVJMEA-UHFFFAOYSA-N; InChI=1/C14H14NO4PS/c1-2-18-20(21,14-6-4-3-5-7-14)19-13-10-8-12(9-11-13)15(16)17/h3-11H,2H2,1H3 Key: AIGRXSNSLVJMEA-UHFFFAOYAT
- SMILES: CCOP(=S)(c1ccccc1)Oc2ccc(cc2)[N+]([O-])=O

Properties
Chemical formula	C_{14}H_{14}NO_{4}PS
Molar mass	323.30 g·mol^{−1}
Appearance	Light yellow crystalline powder
Density	1.3 g/cm^{3}
Melting point	36 °C (97 °F; 309 K)
Boiling point	215°C at 0.667kPa
Solubility in water	Insoluble

Hazards
Flash point	noncombustible
- Lethal dose or concentration (LD, LC)
LD_{50} (median dose)	20 mg/kg (oral, dog); 8 mg/kg (oral, rat); 36 mg/kg (oral, rat); 7 mg/kg (oral, rat); 12.2 mg/kg (oral, mouse)
- NIOSH (US health exposure limits)
PEL (Permissible)	TWA 0.5 mg/m^{3} [skin]
REL (Recommended)	TWA 0.5 mg/m^{3} [skin]
IDLH (Immediate danger)	5 mg/m^{3}
- Except where otherwise noted, data are given for materials in their standard state (at 25 °C [77 °F], 100 kPa). Infobox references

EPN is an insecticide of the phosphonothioate class. It is used against pests such as European corn borer, rice stem borer, bollworm, tobacco budworm, and boll weevil.

== Available forms ==
EPN is available in two forms, EPN (O-ethyl O-p-nitrophenyl phenylphosphonothionate) and EPNO (O-ethyl O-p-nitrophenyl phenylphosphonate). EPNO differs from EPN by having an oxygen atom in place of the sulfur atom.

Both these compounds have a (+)- and a (−)-isomer. There are no apparent differences in the rate of hydrolysis of these isomers, but the (+)-isomer of both EPN and EPNO is more toxic to house flies. While the (+)- and (−)-isomers, and the racemic mixture of both isomers of EPN, are equally toxic to mice. The (+)-isomer of EPNO is more toxic to mice than the (−)-EPNO isomer.

== Mechanism of action ==
EPN, via its oxygen analog EPNO generated by metabolism, causes delayed neurotoxicity. It is an acetylcholinesterase (AChE) inhibitor. AChE is an enzyme that hydrolyzes acetylcholine, an excitatory neurotransmitter. When acetylcholine is released into the synaptic cleft, the postsynaptic action is not terminated by reuptake. Rather, the acetylcholine is broken down by AChE into acetate and choline which is then taken up by the presynaptic terminal where the choline together with acetyl CoA is resynthesized into acetylcholine. AChE is therefore present in high concentrations in the synaptic cleft.

EPN can enter the nervous system readily due to it being lipophilic in nature. Here it inhibits AChE by binding to a serine residue located at the active site of AChE. The subsequent lack of acetylcholine hydrolysis causes accumulation of acetylcholine at cholinergic synapses. This in turn causes cholinergic receptors to become overstimulated.

== Metabolism ==
EPN itself is not directly toxic; the phosphorus-sulfur group is biotransformed into a phosphorus-oxygen group. The newly obtained oxygen analog is the compound that inhibits. Furthermore, EPN has been observed to yield different metabolic products in animals, including p-aminophenyl ethyl benzenethiophosphonate, O-ethyl phenylphosphonic acid, phenylphosphonic acid, O-ethyl phenylphosphonothioic acid, p-nitrophenol, and phenol. The p-nitrophenol can be further metabolized in the liver. The remaining amine is still a weak inhibitor.

== Applications ==
EPN is an insecticide and an acaricide effective against orchard pests, including apple flea weevil, plum curculio, and codling moth and for some soil insects. It is also good to use against the following pests: rice stem borer, boll weevils, oriental fruit moth, fruit moths, codling moths, cotton bollworms, peachtree borers, pear psylla, aphids, scale, budmoths, leafrollers, mites, European corn borers, aphids, thrips, armyworms, leaf miners, mexican beetles and many others.

== Toxicity ==
In humans, EPN causes various symptoms including sweating, tearing, weakness, headache, dizziness, nausea, vomiting, tightness in chest, seizures, loss of consciousness, diarrhea, and abdominal cramps. The toxicity of EPN has been determined by performing animal experiments on various species, including different types of rodents, different types of birds and even cats and dogs^{15}. EPN has been administered to the animal test subjects via different ways of exposure including oral-, skin-, eye-, intraperitoneal- and subcutaneous administration>. Exposure to humans can happen through inhalation of the aerosol, ingestion and absorption through skin. There is no reliable information available on LD_{50} values in humans. However, the recommended limits of skin exposure to EPN, stated by the American Conference of Governmental Industrial Hygienists (ACGIH) in 2008, were a time weighted average of 0.5 mg/m^{3} and a short term exposure level of 2 mg/m^{3}. Additionally when human volunteers were fed 6 mg of EPN per day for 47 days, no effect was found. When the daily dose was raised to 9 mg for 57 days, a reversible inhibition of blood cholinesterase was found. In table 1 some LD_{50} values for various non-human species are listed.

Table 1: LD_{50} values of EPN for different routes of exposure administered to various organisms

All data was derived from^{16}

Route of exposure	Organism	LD_{50} value
Oral	Chicken	5 mg/kg bodyweight
Oral	Dog	20 mg/kg bodyweight
Oral	Duck	3 mg/kg bodyweight
Oral	Mouse	12.2 mg/kg bodyweight
Oral	Pigeon	4.21 mg/kg bodyweight
Oral	Quail	5 mg/kg bodyweight
Oral	Rat	7 mg/kg bodyweight
Oral	Wild bird	2.37 mg/kg bodyweight
Inhalation	Rat	106 mg/m^{3}/1H
Skin	Cat	45 mg/kg
Skin	Duck	400 mg/kg
Skin	Mouse	348 mg/kg
Skin	Rabbit	30 mg/kg
Skin	Rat	25 mg/kg

== Acute toxicity ==
When rats inhaled a lethal dose of EPN, they showed muscle twitches (fasciculations) originating from the peripheral nervous system. Furthermore, convulsions of the lungs and thorax were observed along with shortness of breath. However, when a lethal dose of EPN was administered via the skin to rats, the rats showed excitement additional to the aforementioned effects. When EPN was administered to cats via the skin, similar behavior was observed, although the animals showed signs of paralysis without anesthesia instead of fasciculations. Overall, it can be stated that an overdose of EPN results in convulsions and tremor and eventually causes death. The period till death after administration of a lethal dose of EPN is, however, not listed.

== Occupational toxicity ==
Different countries have set different limits of acceptable occupational toxicity of EPN. These values range from 0.1 to 0.5 mg/m^{3} via skin exposure. Chronic effects were not observed when hens were fed 18 ppm EPN for 21 months. When fed 54 ppm for 21 months, signs of delayed neurotoxicity were observed.

== Treatment ==
There is no specific antidote listed for EPN. Symptoms of acute poisoning by EPN develop during exposure or in the following twelve hours. These symptoms range from dizziness and headaches, to tremor, muscle twitching and if exposed to a high dose even to respiratory deficiency. Since EPN is an organophosphorus compound that inhibits acetylcholinesterase (AChE), it is advised to administer atropine sulfite intravenously or intramuscularly until atropinization is achieved. This atropinization can take up to 12 hours and must be repeated in order to have the desired effect.
