= GD-42 =

Chemical compound

Names
- Preferred IUPAC name 4,8-Dimethyl-4-oxo-3-oxa-5,8-dithia-4λ^{5}-phosphadecan-8-ium methyl sulfate
- Other names Methylsulfomethylate

Identifiers
CAS Number	2562-54-1
3D model (JSmol)	Interactive image
ChemSpider	144645
PubChem CID	164986
CompTox Dashboard (EPA)	DTXSID70948485
- InChI: InChI=1S/C8H20O2PS2.CH4O4S/c1-5-10-11(3,9)12-7-8-13(4)6-2;1-5-6(2,3)4/h5-8H2,1-4H3;1H3,(H,2,3,4)/q+1;/p-1 Key: AUACWHVUVIIDOR-UHFFFAOYSA-M
- SMILES: CCOP(=O)(C)SCC[S+](C)CC.COS(=O)(=O)[O-]

Properties
Chemical formula	C_{9}H_{23}O_{6}PS_{3}
Molar mass	354.43 g·mol^{−1}
- Except where otherwise noted, data are given for materials in their standard state (at 25 °C [77 °F], 100 kPa). Infobox references

GD-42 (methylsulfomethylate) is an irreversible acetylcholinesterase inhibitor. It has a positively charged sulfonium group.

== See also ==
- Armine (chemical)
- Paraoxon
- Ro 3-0419
- Ro 3-0422
- V-sub x
