= Parathion S =

Names
- Preferred IUPAC name O,O-Diethyl S-(4-nitrophenyl) phosphorothioate
- Other names S-Phenyl parathion

Identifiers
CAS Number	3270-86-8
3D model (JSmol)	Interactive image
ChemSpider	2297420
PubChem CID	3032440
UNII	E5274AVK5Q
CompTox Dashboard (EPA)	DTXSID80186371
- InChI: InChI=1S/C10H14NO5PS/c1-3-15-17(14,16-4-2)18-10-7-5-9(6-8-10)11(12)13/h5-8H,3-4H2,1-2H3 Key: DSVCXDBXXBVSEB-UHFFFAOYSA-N
- SMILES: CCOP(=O)(OCC)Sc1ccc(cc1)[N+](=O)[O-]

Properties
Chemical formula	C_{10}H_{14}NO_{5}PS
Molar mass	291.26 g·mol^{−1}
Appearance	Pale yellow crystalline solid

Hazards
- Lethal dose or concentration (LD, LC)
LD_{50} (median dose)	107 μg/kg (mice, intraperitoneal); 4.41 mg/kg (rats, oral)
- Except where otherwise noted, data are given for materials in their standard state (at 25 °C [77 °F], 100 kPa). Infobox references

Parathion S is an organophosphate related to the organophosphate insecticide paraoxon and parathion. It's the structural isomer of parathion. Parathion S is a potent acetylcholinesterase inhibitor.

== See also ==
- Paraoxon
- Parathion
- Diisopropyl paraoxon
- Ro 3-0419
- Ro 3-0422
