= VR-56 (nerve agent) =

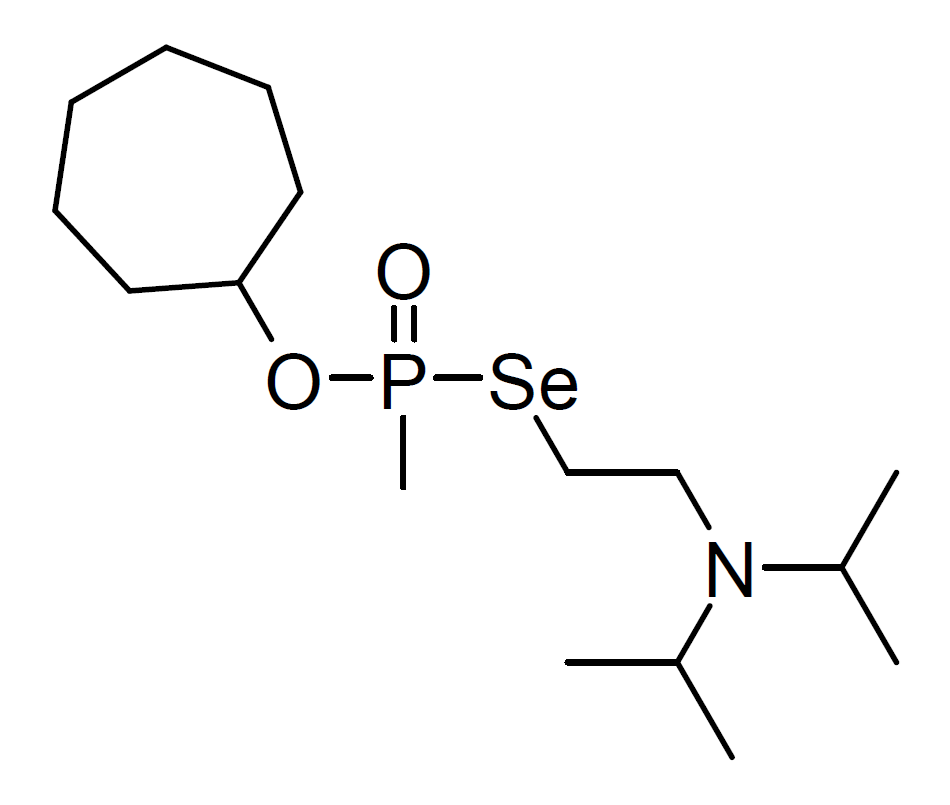

Names
- Preferred IUPAC name O-cycloheptyl Se-[2-(diisopropylamino)ethyl] methylphosphonoselenate

Identifiers
3D model (JSmol)	Interactive image
- InChI: InChI=1S/C16H34NO2PSe/c1-14(2)17(15(3)4)12-13-21-20(5,18)19-16-10-8-6-7-9-11-16/h14-16H,6-13H2,1-5H3 Key: BHFQNCXIEPKVEA-UHFFFAOYSA-N
- SMILES: C1CCCCCC1O[P](C)(=O)[Se]CCN(C(C)C)C(C)C

Properties
Chemical formula	C_{16}H_{34}NO_{2}PSe
Molar mass	382.398 g·mol^{−1}

Hazards
- Occupational safety and health (OHS/OSH)
Main hazards	Extremely toxic
- Except where otherwise noted, data are given for materials in their standard state (at 25 °C [77 °F], 100 kPa). Infobox references

VR-56 is an extremely toxic organophosphate nerve agent of the V-series.

== See also ==
- EA-5488
- V-sub x
- VP (nerve agent)
- VT (nerve agent)
