= Ro 3-0412 =

Names
- Preferred IUPAC name 3-[(Dimethoxyphosphoryl)oxy]-N,N,N-trimethylanilinium methyl sulfate
- Other names Dimethylphosphostigmine

Identifiers
CAS Number	77967-17-0
3D model (JSmol)	Interactive image
ChemSpider	48765
PubChem CID	53991
CompTox Dashboard (EPA)	DTXSID50228631
- InChI: InChI=1S/C11H19NO4P.CH4O4S/c1-12(2,3)10-7-6-8-11(9-10)16-17(13,14-4)15-5;1-5-6(2,3)4/h6-9H,1-5H3;1H3,(H,2,3,4)/q+1;/p-1 Key: SEPBMCLYOUSLFT-UHFFFAOYSA-M
- SMILES: C[N+](C)(C)c1cccc(c1)OP(=O)(OC)OC.COS(=O)(=O)[O-]

Properties
Chemical formula	C_{12}H_{22}NO_{8}PS
Molar mass	371.34 g·mol^{−1}

Hazards
- Lethal dose or concentration (LD, LC)
LD_{50} (median dose)	0.57 mg/kg (mice, intravenous)
- Except where otherwise noted, data are given for materials in their standard state (at 25 °C [77 °F], 100 kPa). Infobox references

Ro 3-0412 is an acetylcholinesterase inhibitor. It is the organophosphate analog of neostigmine.

== See also ==
- Neostigmine
- Ro 3-0419
- Ro 3-0422
