= EA-5488 =

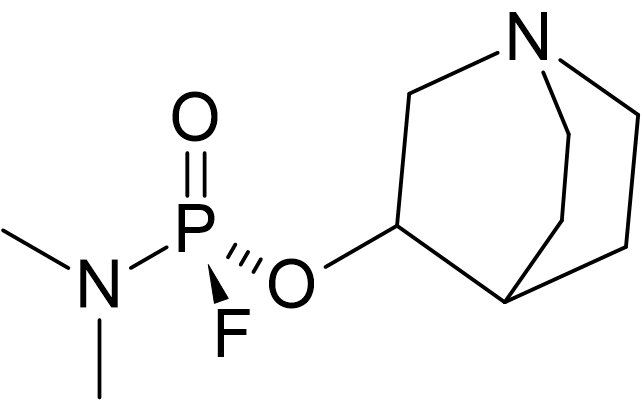

Names
- Preferred IUPAC name 1-Azabicyclo[3.2.1]octan-5-yl N,N-dimethylphosphoramidofluoridate

Identifiers
3D model (JSmol)	Interactive image
- InChI: InChI=1S/C9H18FN2O2P/c1-11(2)15(10,13)14-9-4-3-6-12(8-9)7-5-9/h3-8H2,1-2H3 Key: ZKUKKJOKYIJNBX-UHFFFAOYSA-N
- SMILES: CN(C)P(=O)(F)OC12CN(CC1)CCC2

Properties
Chemical formula	C_{9}H_{18}FN_{2}O_{2}P
Molar mass	236.227 g·mol^{−1}

Hazards
- Occupational safety and health (OHS/OSH)
Main hazards	Extremely toxic
- Except where otherwise noted, data are given for materials in their standard state (at 25 °C [77 °F], 100 kPa). Infobox references

EA-5488 is an extremely toxic organophosphate nerve agent related to GV. It appears to have less than half the toxicity of the VX agent.

== See also ==
- V-sub x
- VP (nerve agent)
- VT (nerve agent)
- VR-56 (nerve agent)
