= C10H14NO5PS =

The molecular formula C_{10}H_{14}NO_{5}PS may refer to:

- Parathion, an organophosphate insecticide and acaricide
- Parathion S, an organophosphate related to the organophosphate insecticide paraoxon and parathion
