= 2-Ethoxycarbonyl-1-methylvinyl cyclohexyl methylphosphonate =

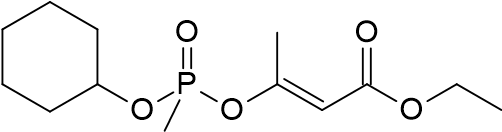

Names
- Preferred IUPAC name Ethyl 3-{[(cyclohexyloxy)(methylphosphonoyl)]oxy}but-2-enoate

Identifiers
| 3D model (JSmol) | Interactive image |
| ChemSpider | 95669708 |
| PubChem CID | 154263067 |
| CompTox Dashboard (EPA) | DTXSID201020093 |
- InChI: InChI=1S/C13H23O5P/c1-4-16-13(14)10-11(2)17-19(3,15)18-12-8-6-5-7-9-12/h10,12H,4-9H2,1-3H3 Key: TTYDEDJCAOJJNU-UHFFFAOYSA-N
- SMILES: CCOC(=O)C=C(C)O[P](C)(=O)OC1CCCCC1

Properties
| Chemical formula | C_{13}H_{23}O_{5}P |
| Molar mass | 290.296 g·mol^{−1} |
- Except where otherwise noted, data are given for materials in their standard state (at 25 °C [77 °F], 100 kPa). Infobox references

2-Ethoxycarbonyl-1-methylvinyl cyclohexyl methylphosphonate is an extremely toxic organophosphate nerve agent. It is the cyclohexyl methylphosphonate ester of ethyl acetoacetate. The compound has two isomers, the cis isomer and trans isomer, with the trans isomer being more toxic. EA-1671 is its lower but more toxic homolog.

== See also ==
- 3,3,5-Trimethylcyclohexyl 3-pyridyl methylphosphonate
- Mevinphos

== Structural analog ==
- EA-1671 (2-Methoxycarbonyl-1-methylvinyl cyclohexyl methylphosphonate)
- EA-1576 (2-Ethoxycarbonyl-1-methylvinyl 3-methylcyclohexyl methylphosphonate)
- EA-1598 (2-Methoxycarbonyl-1-methylvinyl 3-methylcyclohexyl methylphosphonate)
- EA-1659 (2-Methoxycarbonyl-1-cyclopentenyl 3-methylcyclohexyl methylphosphonate)
