= Armine (chemical) =

Names
- Preferred IUPAC name Ethyl 4-nitrophenyl ethylphosphonate

Identifiers
CAS Number	546-71-4
3D model (JSmol)	Interactive image
ChEBI	CHEBI:32353
ChEMBL	ChEMBL2106820
ChemSpider	59457
KEGG	C13048
MeSH	Armin
PubChem CID	66067
UNII	H39MRI1X2O
CompTox Dashboard (EPA)	DTXSID5048843
- InChI: InChI=1S/C10H14NO5P/c1-3-15-17(14,4-2)16-10-7-5-9(6-8-10)11(12)13/h5-8H,3-4H2,1-2H3 Key: XXUJMEYKYHETBZ-UHFFFAOYSA-N
- SMILES: CCOP(=O)(CC)Oc1ccc(cc1)[N+](=O)[O-]

Properties
Chemical formula	C_{10}H_{14}NO_{5}P
Molar mass	259.198 g·mol^{−1}
- Except where otherwise noted, data are given for materials in their standard state (at 25 °C [77 °F], 100 kPa). Infobox references

Armine is an acetylcholinesterase inhibitor related to paraoxon.

== See also ==
- Paraoxon
- Ro 3-0419
- Ro 3-0422
- Project Coast
