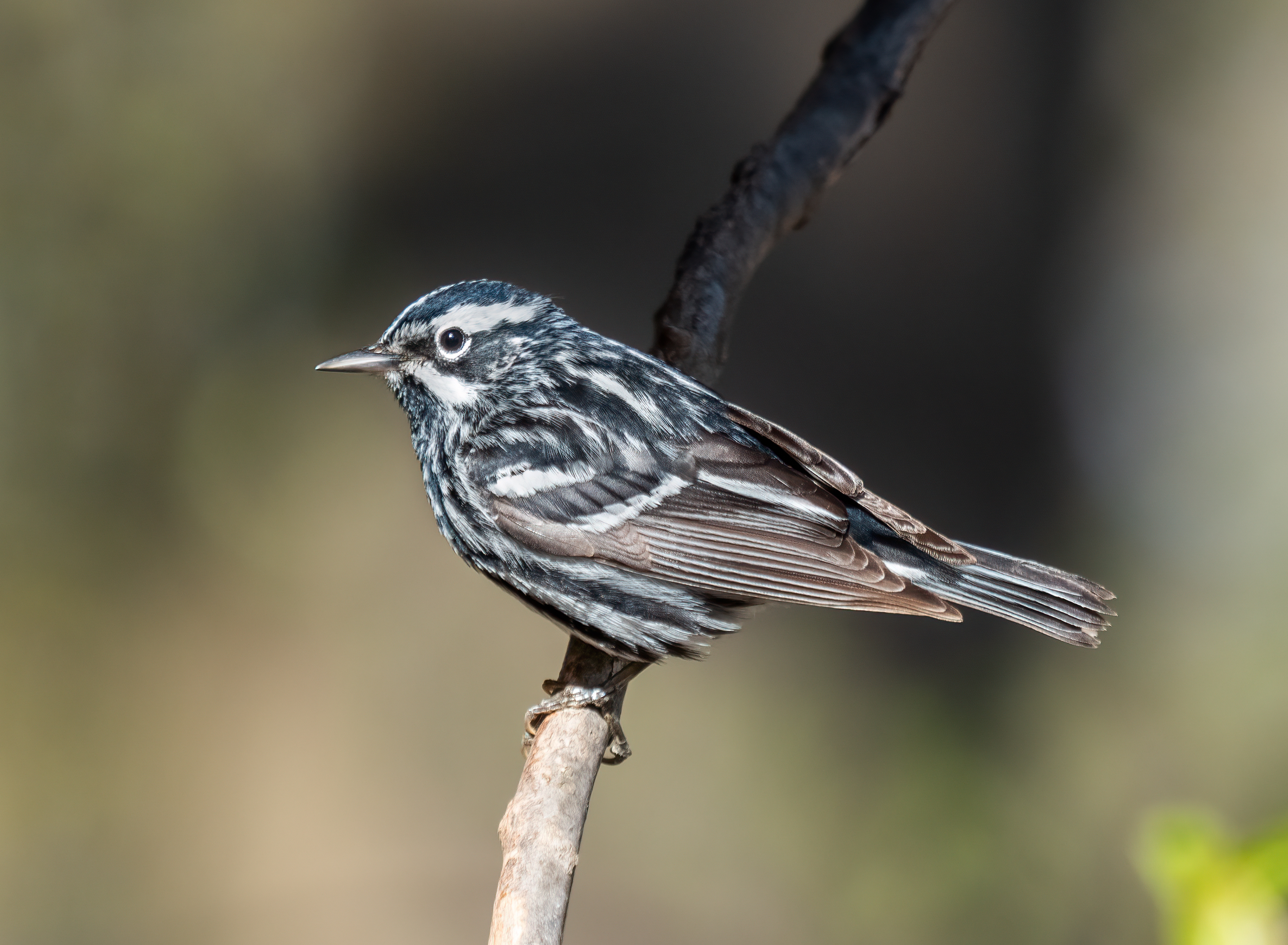

Conservation status
- Least Concern (IUCN 3.1)

Scientific classification
- Kingdom: Animalia
- Phylum: Chordata
- Class: Aves
- Order: Passeriformes
- Family: Parulidae
- Genus: Mniotilta; Vieillot, 1816
- Species: M. varia

Binomial name
- Mniotilta varia (Linnaeus, 1766)
- Range Breeding range Wintering range

Synonyms
- Motacilla varia Linnaeus, 1766

= Black-and-white warbler =

Black-and-white warbler Temporal range: Late Pleistocene–present

Species of New World warbler

The black-and-white warbler (Mniotilta varia) is a species of New World warbler, and the only member of its genus, Mniotilta. It breeds in northern and eastern North America and winters in Florida, Central America, and the West Indies down to Peru. It has been recorded as a vagrant in Northern Europe, especially Britain and Ireland. Relative to other New World warblers, it is not well studied.

== Taxonomy ==
The black-and-white warbler was formally described in 1766 by the Swedish naturalist Carl Linnaeus in the twelfth edition of his Systema Naturae under the binomial name Motacilla varia. The specific epithet is from Latin varius meaning "various", "diverse" or "variegated". Linnaeus based his entry of the "small black and white bird" that had been described by the Irish physician Hans Sloane in 1725 and "Le Figuier varié de S. Domingue" that had been described by the French ornithologist Louis Vieillot in 1760. Linnaeus specified the location as Jamaica and Dominica but this was restricted to Santo Domingo in the Dominican Republic by the American Ornithologists' Union in 1910. The black-and-white warbler is now the only species placed in the genus Mniotilta that was introduced by the French ornithologist Louis Vieillot in 1816. The genus name combines the Ancient Greek μνιον/mnion meaning "seaweed" (clearly an error for μνιοεις/mnioeis meaning "moss") and τιλλω/tillō meaning "to pluck". The species is monotypic: no subspecies are recognised.

The black-and-white warbler is known to hybridize with the cerulean warbler (Setophaga cerulea) and Blackburnian warbler (Setophaga fusca). However, it is not closely related to the genus Setophaga.

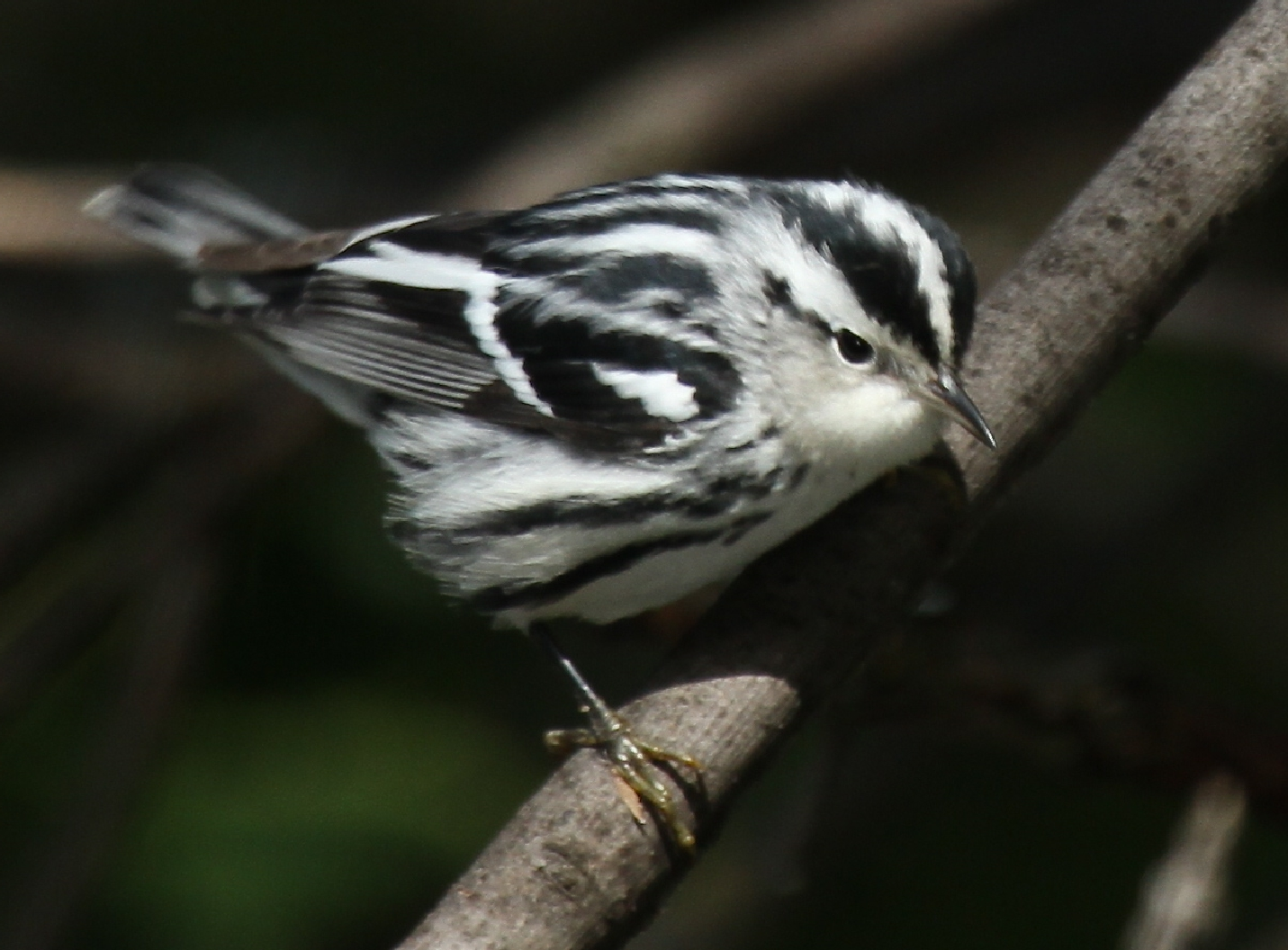
Columbus Park – Chicago

== Description ==
The black-and-white warbler is 11 cm (4.3 in) to 13 cm (5.1 in) in length with a mass of 8 g (0.28 oz) to 15 g (0.53 oz) grams. Wingspan ranges from 7.1 to 8.7 in (18–22 cm). True to their name, black-and-white warblers are black and white in colour. Both sexes have black and white crowns with a white eyebrow, black streaking on a white belly, black wings with two white wing bars, a black tail, a black-and-white streaked back, streaky undertail coverts, and grey-black legs and feet. Breeding males have a black-and-white streaked throat and black cheek, while females have a grey cheek and a white-cream coloured throat and sides. First fall males are very similar to adult females in colour and patterning, while first fall females resemble adult females but with less streaking and a more noticeable buffy wash. Juveniles are heavily spotted, but are similar to first fall individuals otherwise.

This species is 12 cm (5 in) long and weighs 11 g (0.39 oz). The summer male black-and-white warbler is boldly streaked in black and white, and the bird has been described as a flying humbug. Each wing is black with two white wing bars. Female and juvenile plumages are similar, but duller and less streaky than males.

This warbler can be confused with the blackpoll warbler (Setophaga striata). The blackpoll warbler is also black and white in its summer plumage, but has a solid black cap. The black-and-white warbler can also be confused behaviourally with the pine warbler (Setophaga pinus) and yellow-throated warbler (Setophaga dominica).

== Distribution and habitat ==
The black-and-white warbler breeds in northern and eastern North America. It ranges from the Northwest Territories to the northwest and Newfoundland and Labrador to the northeast, to North Carolina to the southeast and Texas to the southwest. This species is migratory, wintering in Florida, Central America, the West Indies and northern South America down to Peru. The IUCN estimates the extent of occurrence, or range, to be 11,500,000 km^{2}. It occurs as a vagrant in Iceland, Ireland, Faeroes, and the UK.

It is a migratory species, breeding in North America and wintering in North and South America. It is typically found in deciduous forest in its breeding range, but becomes more of a habitat generalist in the non-breeding season.

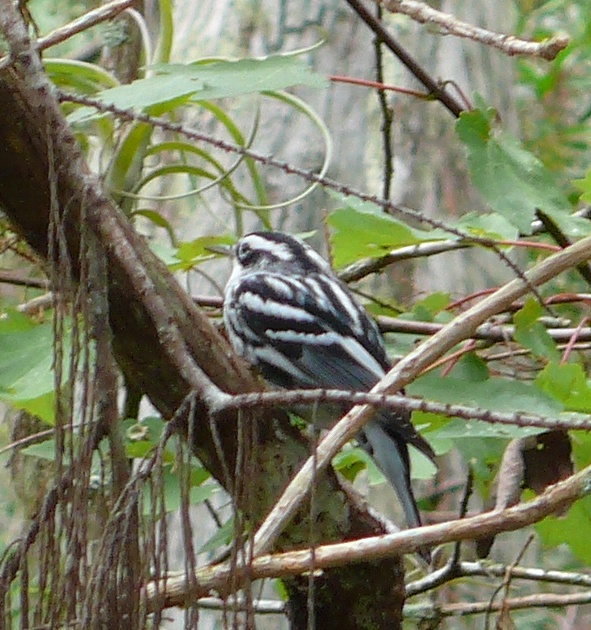
Black-and-white warbler

The species occupies a broad niche, and is found in a variety of habitats. In its breeding habitat, it prefers mature forest, but will occupy successional and second growth forest. Preferred forest types include deciduous and mixed forest, and this warbler sometimes occupies swampy forest. During migration, this species prefers forest to other land cover types and is frequently found in riparian areas. In its wintering habitat, it can be found in a variety of land cover types, from mangroves to wet, dry, and cloud forest. It occupies both successional and mature forest. It has also been noted to winter in shade coffee plantations and gardens. Males are territorial in both their summer and winter habitats.

== Behaviour ==
=== Vocalization ===
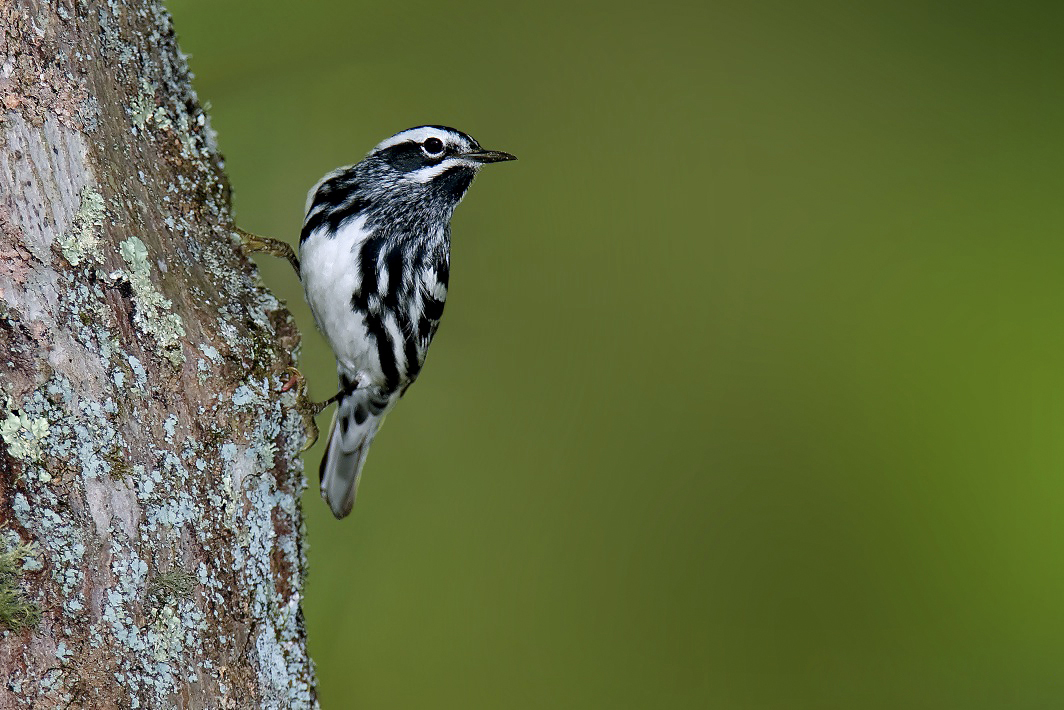
Breeding male

The black-and-white warbler has a high-pitched song, described as a repeating wee-see that is repeated at least six times in succession. It has a chip call as well as a seet-seet call that is sometimes given in flight. Its song is a high see wee-see wee-see wee-see wee-see wee-see or weesa weesa weetee weetee weetee weet weet weet. It has two calls, a hard tick and a soft, thin fsss.

=== Food and feeding ===
The black-and-white warbler feeds on insects and spiders, and, unlike other warblers, forages like a nuthatch, moving up and down tree trunks and along branches. It is the only North American wood-warbler to forage on bark. Its short legs and long hind toe are adaptations benefitting its foraging method. This bird also gleans, like many warblers, for insects. Its diet is composed of insects and other arthropods, including lepidopteran larvae, beetles, ants, and spiders. During migration and breeding, this warbler relies heavily on lepidopteran larvae. During migration, the black-and-white warbler sometimes joins mixed flocks to feed. It is known to occasionally eat anoles on its wintering grounds in the Caribbean.

=== Breeding ===
The black-and-white warbler is of the first warblers to arrive to its spring breeding grounds. In the southernmost range of its breeding habitat, it can begin breeding mid-April. Males are territorial and defend their territory, both by singing and chasing competitors away. When a female arrives in a male's territory, he pursues her in an effort to breed. The male may display by flapping his wings.

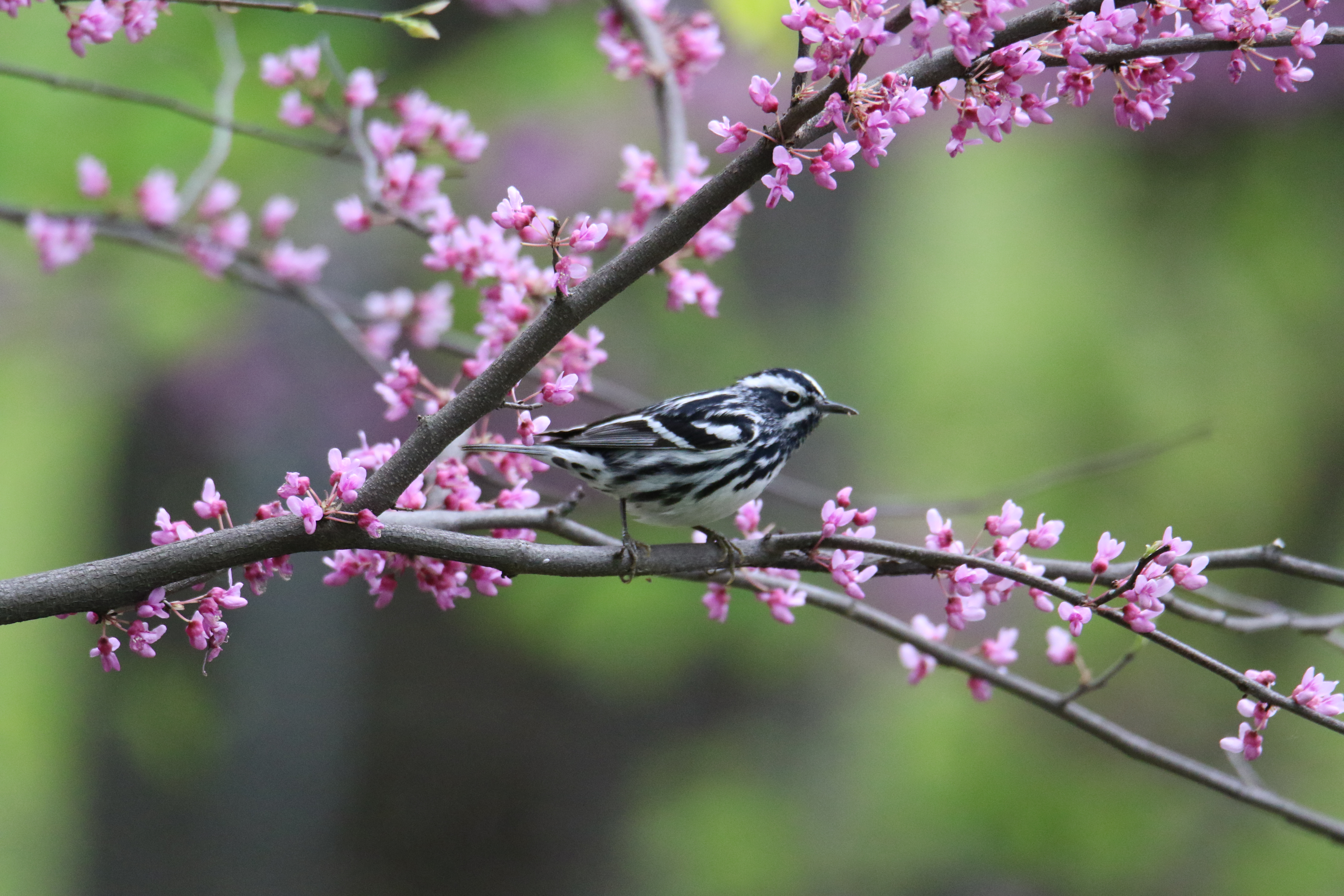
Black-and-white warbler visits Central Park in New York City

It breeds in broadleaved or mixed forest, preferably in wetter areas. Black-and-white warblers nest on the ground, laying four or five eggs in a cup nest. The nest is cup-shaped, often located on the ground among roots or against a tree, or in crevices on tree stumps. The species prefers to nest in damp areas. The nest is constructed with grassy material, bark, and dry leaves, and lined with softer material such as moss and hair. The female is responsible for most of the nest-building. The female lays four or five eggs, which are light brown and speckled with darker brown. The female begins incubating once the last or second-to-last egg is laid. Incubation lasts 10 to 12 days, and is done solely by the female. During incubation, the female is sometimes fed by the male. Both parents care for the nestlings. The young fledge after 8 to 12 days, and stay around the nest while they improve their flight ability. During this time, the parents remain nearby. This species generally produces one brood per year. The nests are sometimes parasitized by the brown-headed cowbird (Molothrus ater).

== Conservation status ==
The IUCN classifies the black-and-white warbler as Least Concern due to its large range and population size. Its population is believed to be stable as of 2021. Habitat loss and degradation, especially forest fragmentation, are the main threats to the species. If habitat loss continues, in either or both summer or wintering habitat, the species may decline in the future. Pesticides such as fenitrothion and phosphamidon have contributed to the species' decline in the 1970s, and others such as chlorinated hydrocarbons may continue to have an effect.

== Gallery ==
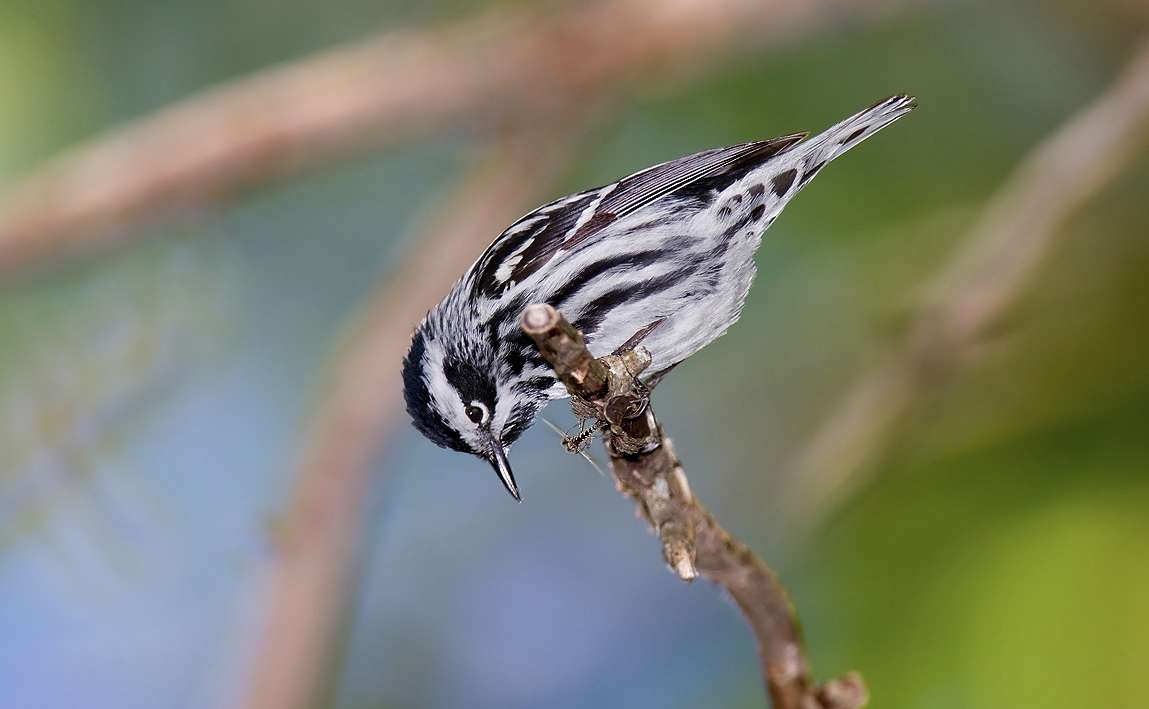

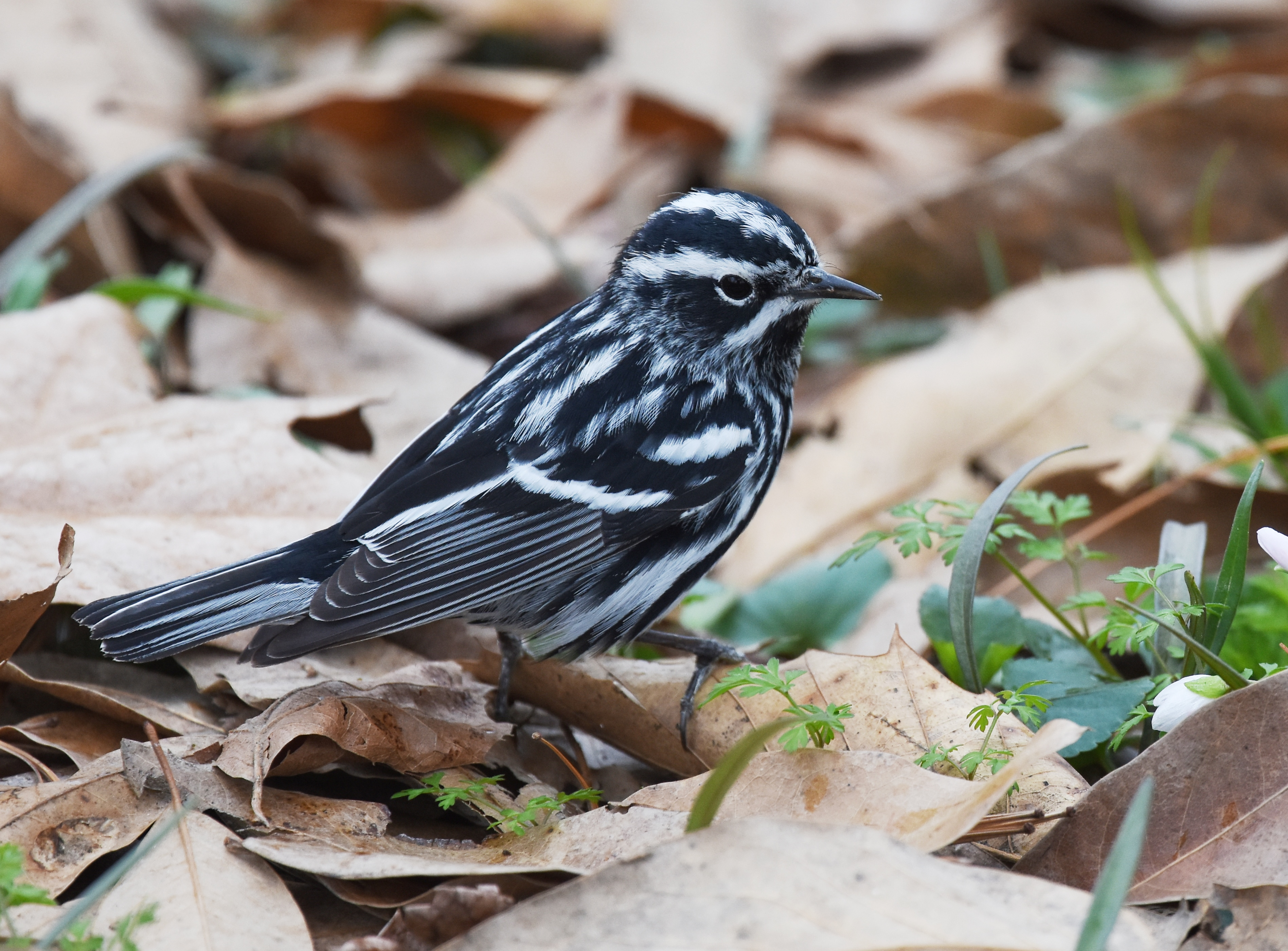

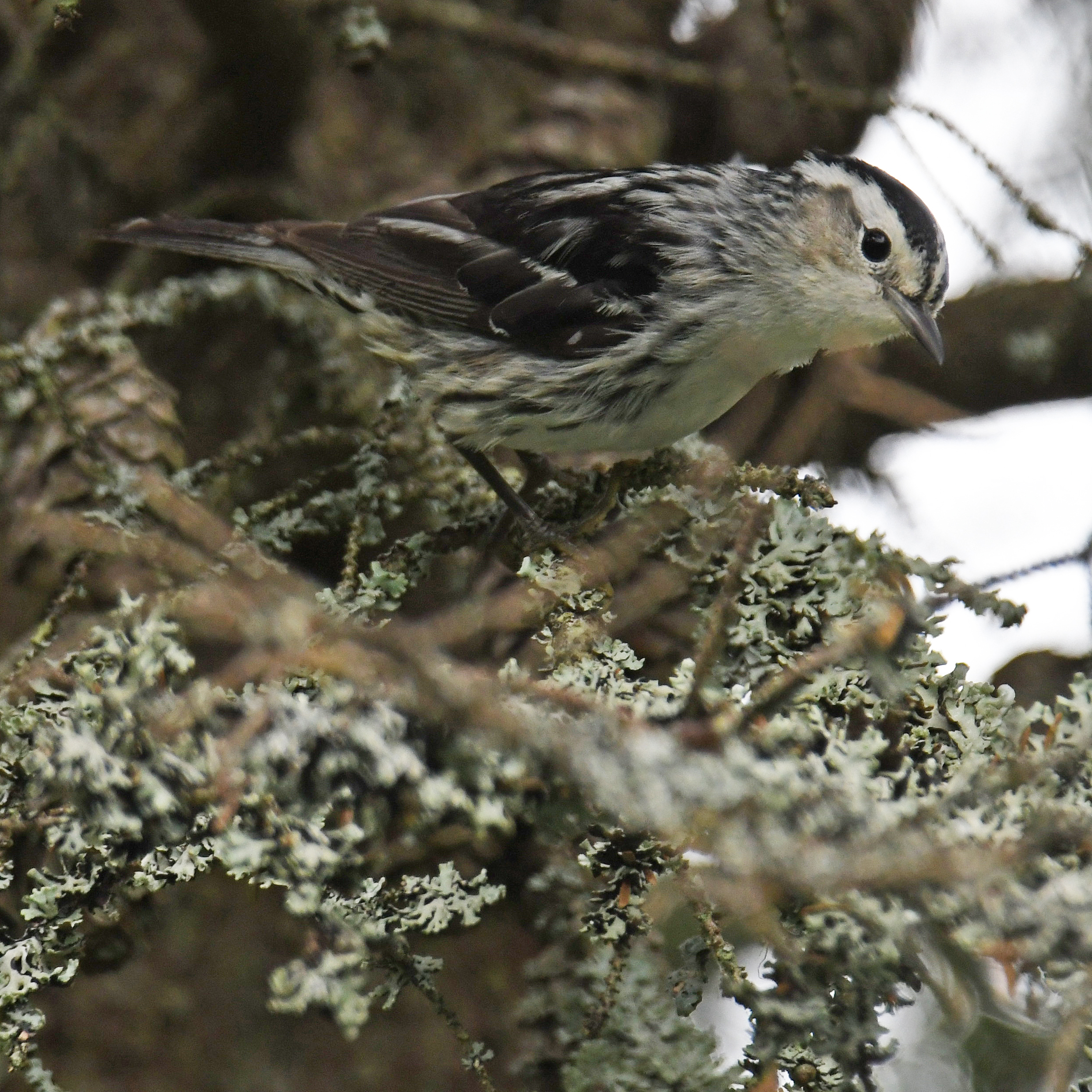
