= Sasthamkotta Folidol Tragedy =

The Follidol tragedy occurred on April 29, 1958 in Kerala, India and was caused by pesticide contamination. In the incident, 64 people lost their lives due to consuming wheat flour that had been mixed with Follidol, a pesticide. The fatal mistake caused because of the preparation of chapatis (Indian flatbread) using the contaminated flour, resulting in a devastating accident.

The Lok Sahay Sena, a paramilitary division under the defense of India, organized a camp in Sasthamcotta. Chappathis distributed among the inmates caused the disaster. 41 trainees, two army officers, three camp helpers and 19 local children died in the disaster. During the further investigation, it was revealed that the cans of Folidol, which had been carelessly stored on the ship, had leaked and spilled over the sacks of flour, atta, semolina and sugar stored below.
