= Rotterdam Convention =

United Nations treaty

Rotterdam Convention on the Prior Informed Consent Procedure for Certain Hazardous Chemicals and Pesticides in International Trade
- The logo of the Rotterdam Convention Secretariat
- Type: United Nations treaty
- Signed: 10 September 1998
- Location: Rotterdam, the Netherlands
- Effective: 24 February 2004
- Condition: Ninety days after the ratification by at least 50 signatory states
- Signatories: 72
- Parties: 161
- Depositary: Secretary-General of the United Nations
- Languages: Arabic, Chinese, English, French, Russian, Spanish
- http://www.pic.int/

The Rotterdam Convention (formally, the Rotterdam Convention on the Prior Informed Consent Procedure for Certain Hazardous Chemicals and Pesticides in International Trade) is a multilateral treaty to promote shared responsibilities in relation to importation of hazardous chemicals. The convention promotes open exchange of information and calls on exporters of hazardous chemicals to use proper labeling, include directions on safe handling, and inform purchasers of any known restrictions or bans. Signatory nations can decide whether to allow or ban the importation of chemicals listed in the treaty, and exporting countries are obliged to make sure that producers within their jurisdiction comply.

In 2012, the Secretariats of the Basel and Stockholm conventions, as well as the UNEP-part of the Rotterdam Convention Secretariat, merged to a single Secretariat with a matrix structure serving the three conventions. The three conventions now hold back to back Conferences of the Parties as part of their joint synergies decisions.

The ninth meeting of the Rotterdam Conference was held from 29 April to 10 May 2019 in Geneva, Switzerland.

== Substances covered under the Convention ==
The following chemicals are listed in Annex III to the convention:

- 2,4,5-T and its salts and esters
- Alachlor
- Aldicarb
- Aldrin
- Asbestos – Actinolite, Anthophyllite, Amosite, Crocidolite, and Tremolite only
- Benomyl (certain formulations)
- Binapacryl
- Captafol
- Carbofuran (certain formulations)
- Chlordane
- Chlordimeform
- Chlorobenzilate
- DDT
- Dieldrin
- Dinitro-ortho-cresol (DNOC) and its salts
- Dinoseb and its salts and esters
- 1,2-dibromoethane (EDB)
- Endosulfan
- Ethylene dichloride
- Ethylene oxide
- Fluoroacetamide
- Hexachlorocyclohexane (mixed isomers)
- Heptachlor
- Hexachlorobenzene
- Lindane
- Mercury compounds including inorganic and organometallic mercury compounds
- Methamidophos (certain formulations)
- Methyl parathion (certain formulations)
- Monocrotophos
- Parathion
- Pentachlorophenol and its salts and esters
- Phosphamidon (certain formulations)
- Polybrominated biphenyls (PBBs)
- Polychlorinated biphenyls (PCBs)
- Polychlorinated terphenyls (PCTs)
- Terbufos
- Tetraethyl lead
- Tetramethyl lead
- Thiram (certain formulations)
- Toxaphene
- Tributyltin compounds
- Trichlorfon
- Tris (2,3-dibromopropyl) phosphate (TRIS)

== Substances recommended for addition to the Convention ==
The Chemical Review Committee of the Rotterdam Convention decided to recommend to the conference of the parties meeting that it consider the listing of the following chemicals in Annex III to the convention:

- Carbosulfan
- Chrysotile asbestos
- Fenthion (ultra low volume (ULV) formulations at or above 640 g active ingredient/L)
- Liquid formulations (emulsifiable concentrate and soluble concentrate) containing paraquat dichloride at or above 276 g/L, corresponding to paraquat ion at or above 200 g/L
- Acetochlor
- Iprodione

== State parties ==
Parties

As of October 2018, the convention has 161 parties, which includes 158 UN member states, the Cook Islands, the State of Palestine, and the European Union. Non-member states include the United States.

== Discussion about chrysotile asbestos ==
At the 2011 meeting of the Rotterdam Convention in Geneva, the Canadian delegation surprised many with a refusal to allow the addition of chrysotile asbestos fibers to the Rotterdam Convention. Hearings are scheduled in the EU in the near future to evaluate the position of Canada and decide on the possibility of a punitive course of action.

In continuing its objection, Canada is the only G8 country objecting to the listing. Kyrgyzstan, Kazakhstan and Ukraine also objected. Vietnam had also raised an objection, but missed a follow-up meeting on the issue. In taking its position, the Canadian Government contrasted with India, which withdrew its long-standing objection to the addition of chrysotile to the list just prior to the 2011 conference. (India later reversed this position in 2013.)

Numerous non-governmental organizations have publicly expressed criticism of Canada's decision to block this addition.

In September 2012, Canadian Industry minister Christian Paradis announced the Canadian government would no longer oppose inclusion of chrysotile in the convention.

Eight of the largest chrysotile producing and exporting countries opposed such a move at the Rotterdam Conference of Parties in 2015: Russia, Kazakhstan, India, Kyrgyzstan, Pakistan, Cuba, and Zimbabwe.

== See also ==
- Basel Convention
- Stockholm Convention
- Safe Planet
