= Oxon =

Oxon may refer to:

- An abbreviation for the English city of Oxford, or the English county of Oxfordshire, or the University of Oxford (from Oxonia, Latin for Oxford)
- The post-nominal suffix indicating a degree from the University of Oxford (Latin name Universitas Oxoniensis)
- An area of the English town of Shrewsbury
- Oxon (chemical), an organic compound

== See also ==
- Oxen, plural of ox
- Oxon Creek
- Oxon Hill High School
- Oxon Hill, Maryland
- Oxon Hoath
- Oxus
- Auxonne
