= Diisopropyl paraoxon =

Names
- Preferred IUPAC name 4-Nitrophenyl di(propan-2-yl) phosphate
- Other names Diisopropyl (4-nitrophenyl) phosphate

Identifiers
CAS Number	3254-66-8
3D model (JSmol)	Interactive image
ChEMBL	ChEMBL23837
ChemSpider	69200
PubChem CID	76742
UNII	R90A2849YV
CompTox Dashboard (EPA)	DTXSID90186246
- InChI: InChI=1S/C12H18NO6P/c1-9(2)17-20(16,18-10(3)4)19-12-7-5-11(6-8-12)13(14)15/h5-10H,1-4H3 Key: SHMLKFTUAKLHHF-UHFFFAOYSA-N
- SMILES: CC(C)OP(=O)(Oc1ccc(cc1)[N+](=O)[O-])OC(C)C

Properties
Chemical formula	C_{12}H_{18}NO_{6}P
Molar mass	303.251 g·mol^{−1}
Solubility in water	Insoluble
Solubility	Soluble in ethanol
- Except where otherwise noted, data are given for materials in their standard state (at 25 °C [77 °F], 100 kPa). Infobox references

Diisopropyl paraoxon is an organophosphate that inhibits the acetylcholinesterase. It is the isopropyl analog of paraoxon.

Diisopropyl paraoxon is insoluble in water, but it is soluble in ethanol.

== See also ==
- Diisopropyl fluorophosphate
- Paraoxon
- EA-1370
