= 3,3,5-Trimethylcyclohexyl 3-pyridyl methylphosphonate =

VP

Names
- Preferred IUPAC name Pyridin-3-yl 3,3,5-trimethylcyclohexyl methylphosphonate
- Other names EA-1511

Identifiers
3D model (JSmol)	Interactive image
PubChem CID	139033580
CompTox Dashboard (EPA)	DTXSID501020092
- InChI: InChI=1S/C15H24NO3P/c1-12-8-14(10-15(2,3)9-12)19-20(4,17)18-13-6-5-7-16-11-13/h5-7,11-12,14H,8-10H2,1-4H3 Key: KQWAOLPZVUPXQI-UHFFFAOYSA-N
- SMILES: CC2CC(OP(C)(=O)Oc1cccnc1)CC(C)(C)C2

Properties
Chemical formula	C_{15}H_{24}NO_{3}P
Molar mass	297.335 g·mol^{−1}

Hazards
- Occupational safety and health (OHS/OSH)
Main hazards	Extremely toxic
- Except where otherwise noted, data are given for materials in their standard state (at 25 °C [77 °F], 100 kPa). Infobox references

VP (3,3,5-Trimethylcyclohexyl 3-pyridyl methylphosphonate), also known as EA-1511, is an extremely toxic organophosphate nerve agent of the V-series.

Agent VP belongs to a class of organophosphates known as 3-pyridyl phosphonates. These agents are extremely potent acetylcholinesterase inhibitors.

== Synthesis ==
Methylphosphonic dichloride and triethylamine are dissolved in benzene. 3,3,5-Trimethylcyclohexanol is then slowly added while stirring and cooling. The reaction temperature is maintained at 10 –15 °C. The mixture is then heated to 40 °C for 1 hour. A benzene solution of 3,3,5-trimethylcyclohexyl methylphosphonochloridate is formed.

Triethylamine is then added to reaction mixture and 3-pyridol is added slowly while stirring and cooling. The reaction temperature is maintained at 35 °C. The mixture is then stirred for 1 hour at room temperature. The mixture is washed with a sodium hydroxide solution and water. The solvent is then removed by distillation at reduced pressure to yield the final product. The resulting product can be converted to a quaternary salt by reacting with a haloalkane, such as methyl iodide, to produce a water-soluble agent.

== See also ==
- 2-Ethoxycarbonyl-1-methylvinyl cyclohexyl methylphosphonate
- A-234 (nerve agent)
- GV (nerve agent)
- Ro 3-0422
- V-sub x
- VT (nerve agent)
