= Polychlorinated terphenyl =

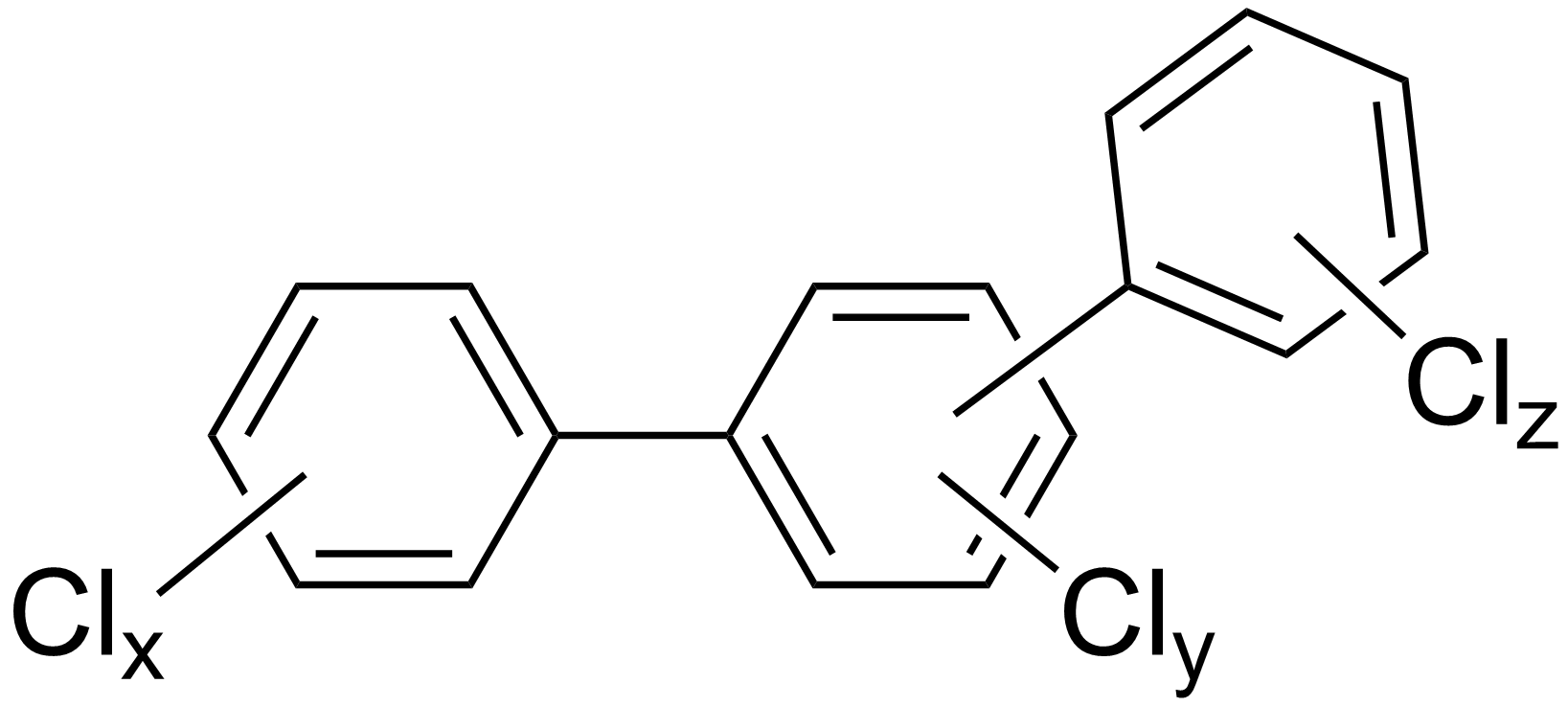
General chemical structure of polychlorinated triphenyls where 0≤x≤5 and 0≤y≤4 and 0≤z≤5

Polychlorinated terphenyls (PCTs) are a group of chlorine derivatives of terphenyls. They are chemically related to polychlorinated biphenyls and have similar chemical properties. They have very low electrical conductivity, high heat stability, and high resistance to alkalis and strong acids. They are non-flammable and insoluble in water.

Typically produced and used as mixtures with varying degrees of chlorination, PCTs were once used as heat transfer agents in electric transformers, as plasticizers, as lubricating oils, and as flame retardants. Their production and use has been largely phased out due to environmental and safety concerns.

International trade in PCTs is regulated by the Rotterdam Convention.
