= Demeton =

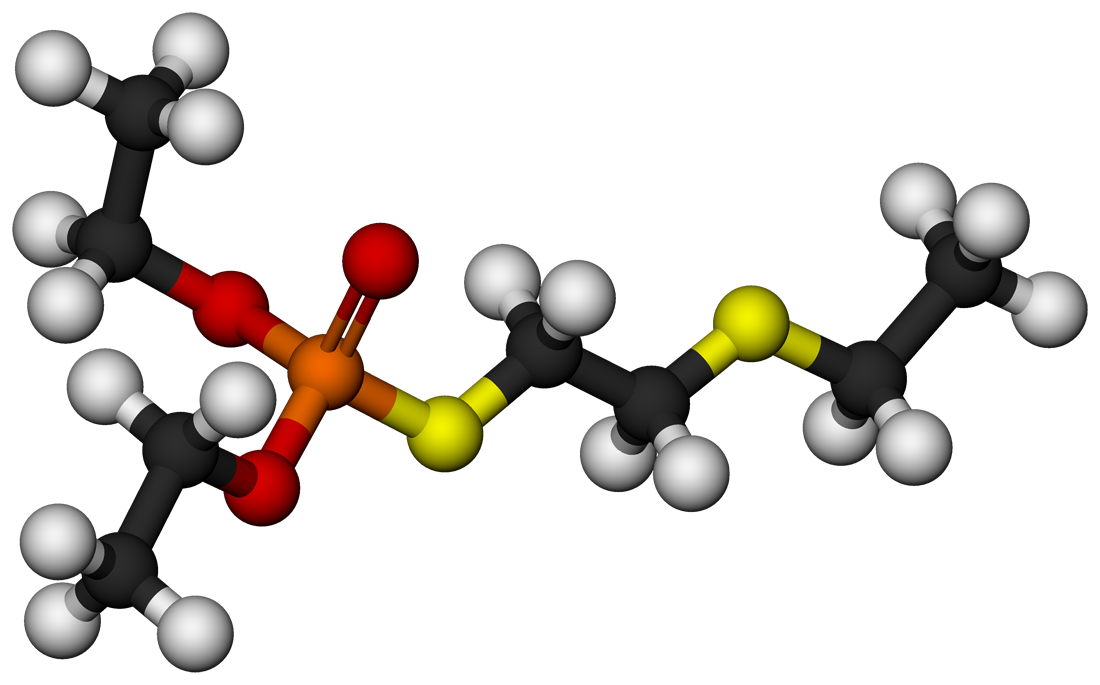

Names
- Preferred IUPAC name O,O-Diethyl S-[2-(ethylsulfanyl)ethyl] phosphorothioate
- Other names Demeton thiol; Izosystox

Identifiers
CAS Number	126-75-0
3D model (JSmol)	Interactive image
ChemSpider	23115
ECHA InfoCard	100.149.173
PubChem CID	24723
UNII	3UQ7N6O63K
CompTox Dashboard (EPA)	DTXSID5022306
- InChI: InChI=1S/C8H19O3PS2/c1-4-10-12(9,11-5-2)14-8-7-13-6-3/h4-8H2,1-3H3 Key: GRPRVIYRYGLIJU-UHFFFAOYSA-N; InChI=1/C8H19O3PS2/c1-4-10-12(9,11-5-2)14-8-7-13-6-3/h4-8H2,1-3H3 Key: GRPRVIYRYGLIJU-UHFFFAOYAI
- SMILES: O=P(OCC)(SCCSCC)OCC

Properties
Chemical formula	C_{8}H_{19}O_{3}PS_{2}
Molar mass	258.3384 g/mol
Appearance	colorless to amber oily liquid
Odor	sulfurous
Density	1.146 g/cm^{3}
Boiling point	128 °C (262 °F; 401 K)
Solubility in water	2.0 g/100 mL
log P	2.38
Refractive index (n_{D})	1.5

Hazards
Flash point	147.6 °C (297.7 °F; 420.8 K)
- Lethal dose or concentration (LD, LC)
LD_{50} (median dose)	1.5 mg/kg (oral, rat)
LD_{Lo} (lowest published)	5 mg/kg (rabbit, oral); 7.85 mg/kg (mouse, oral); 1.7 mg/kg (rat, oral)
LC_{Lo} (lowest published)	15 mg/m^{3} (rat, 4 hr); 15 mg/m^{3} (cat, 4 hr)
- NIOSH (US health exposure limits)
PEL (Permissible)	TWA 0.1 mg/m^{3} [skin]
REL (Recommended)	TWA 0.1 mg/m^{3} [skin]
IDLH (Immediate danger)	10 mg/m^{3}

Related compounds
Related Organothiophosphate insecticides	Demeton-S-methyl
- Except where otherwise noted, data are given for materials in their standard state (at 25 °C [77 °F], 100 kPa). verify (what is ?) Infobox references

Demeton, sold as an amber oily liquid with a sulfur like odour under the name Systox, is an organophosphate derivative causing irritability and shortness of breath to individuals repeatedly exposed. It was used as a phosphorothioate insecticide and acaricide and has the chemical formula C_{8}H_{19}O_{3}PS_{2}. Although it was previously used as an insecticide, it is now largely obsolete due to its relatively high toxicity to humans. Demeton consists of two components, demeton-S and demeton-O in a ratio of approximately 2:1 respectively. The chemical structure of demeton is closely related to military nerve agents such as VX and a derivative with one of the ethoxy groups replaced by methyl was investigated by both the US and Soviet chemical-weapons programs under the names V-sub x and GD-7.

== History ==
Demeton, under the name Systox, was introduced by Bayer in 1951. It was the first systemic insecticide. It was used against aphids, thrips, and sawflies in the agriculture sector. Demeton was distributed through the soil or sprayed over crops and was used widely. In 1982, 162,000 lbs of demeton was used for insecticidal purposes. The registration of the active ingredient of demeton was canceled by the United States Environmental Protection Agency in 1998. Demeton is no longer used in registered pesticides in most countries, including the United States and the Netherlands.

Several cases of serious poisoning or death have been caused by demeton, from both intentional and occupational use. For example, a 16 year-old-boy was exposed to demeton through the occupational spraying of hops with the insecticide. The boy suffered from general weakness, unconsciousness, difficulties with breathing, and a lack of coordination when walking.

== Structure and reactivity ==
When demeton-S is metabolized, thioether oxidation results in the sulfoxide metabolite with further oxidation producing sulfone. The metabolism of demeton-O proceeds analogously. Similarly, demeton-O can be isomerized using heat to demeton-S.

== Synthesis ==
Demeton consists of two components, demeton-S and demeton-O. Production of both isomers can be obtained by reacting 2-hydroxyethylethyl sulfide in diethyl phosphor chloride thiolate in toluene in the presence of anhydrous sodium carbonate and metallic copper. Isomerization produces approximately a 65:35 mixture of Demeton-S and Demeton-O. This mixture of the two compounds is what's referred to as Demeton.

== Toxicity ==
=== Mechanism of action ===
Several studies found that Demeton inhibits the cholinesterase activity in red blood cells and brain of rats, and in the red blood cells of dogs. By inhibiting cholinesterase, the degradation of neurotransmitters such as acetylcholine is prevented, which can lead to symptoms like twitching or more severe convulsions.

=== Metabolism ===
Both isomers of Demeton are metabolized by oxidation of the thioether group into a sulfoxide (Demeton-S) or a sulfone (Demeton-O). There is an additional pathway in Demeton-O metabolism in which the P=S group is oxidized to a P=O group, which is then oxidized again into a sulfoxide and sulfone. Further degradation consists of hydrolyzing the metabolites to produce DEPTH from sulfoxide and DETP from sulfone.

=== Health effects/adverse effects ===
Demeton can be inhaled, ingested, or absorbed through the skin or eyes. The lowest lethal dose recorded in humans is 171 ug/kg. There is no information regarding the long-term or carcinogenic effects of exposure to demeton in humans. In vitro mutagenicity tests have shown that demeton has a significant genotoxic potential. However, disulfoton, of which demeton-S is a metabolite, has not been observed to have carcinogenic effects.

A human volunteer study found that daily oral intake of demeton led to an inhibition of average red blood cell acetylcholinesterase and plasma acetylcholinesterase. No cholinergic symptoms were observed in this study.

=== Symptoms ===
Symptoms of exposure to demeton include typical cholinergic symptoms, such as weakness, respiratory difficulties, and uncoordinated walking. Other symptoms include convulsions, cyanosis, dizziness, vomiting, and headaches.

=== Excretion ===
Based on data regarding disulfoton, of which demeton-S is a metabolite, it is expected that demeton is metabolised rapidly in humans. It is also expected that demeton does not build up in tissues but is excreted through the urine.

== Effects on animals ==
=== Rats ===
Demeton is metabolized quickly, with 50-70% of orally administered demeton being excreted from the body within 24h. As demeton is a mixture, composition of the material should be considered in toxicity evaluations. Demeton-S is more toxic in rats than demeton-O based on their LD50 values of 1.5 and 7.5 mg/kg bodyweight respectively.

Female rats fed 50 ppm Systox™ for 16 weeks showed signs of cholinesterase inhibition, ending the experiment with 93% inhibition of their brain cholinesterase activity. Despite the lowered cholinesterase activity, they were able to consume a daily dose of Systox™ equivalent to 96% of a single lethal dose for a normal rat. The NOAEL value for oral exposure for rats is 0.05 mg/kg bodyweight/day.

Inhalation of 18 mg/m^{3} commercial Systox™ (60% demeton-O, 40% demeton-S) was fatal to all rats within 50-90 minutes after exposure.

=== Dogs ===
Dogs fed 2 ppm demeton experienced plasma and erythrocyte cholinesterase inhibition with significant inhibition occurring after 16 weeks of feeding, and maximum inhibition occurring after 12 weeks with dogs fed 5 ppm. The NOAEL for dogs is 0.047 mg/kg bodyweight/day or 2 ppm Systox/day in their diet.

=== Other animals ===
Intravenous exposure values for the LD50 for mice and cats were found to be 1.75 and 3.9 mg/kg bodyweight respectively. The NOAEL for rabbits is 0.15 mg/kg bodyweight/day of oral exposure of demeton.

== See also ==
- Demeton-S-methyl
- Disulfoton, its phosphorodithioate equivalent
- V-sub x
