= VT (nerve agent) =

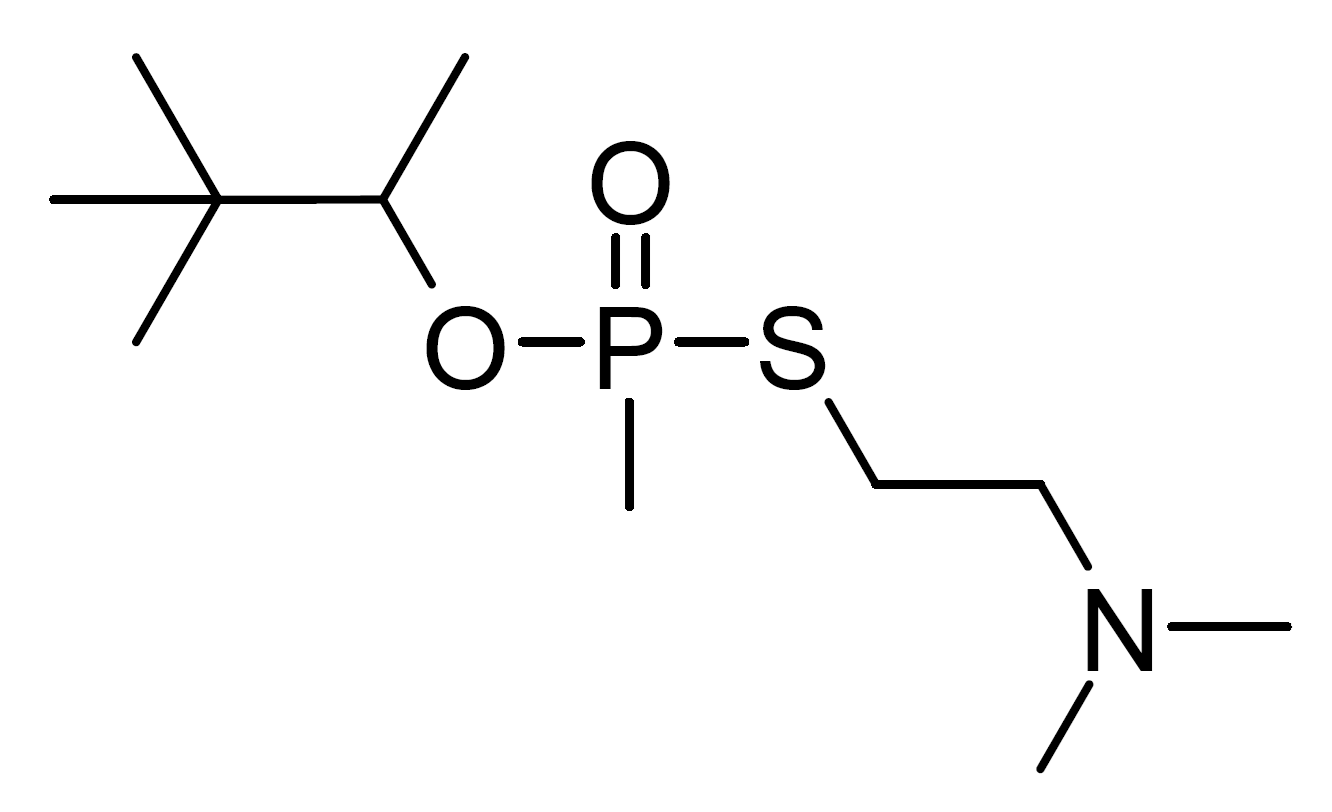

Names
- Preferred IUPAC name 2-[3,3-dimethylbutan-2-yloxy(methyl)phosphoryl]sulfanyl-N,N-dimethylethanamine

Identifiers
| CAS Number | 34388-36-8 |
| 3D model (JSmol) | Interactive image |
| PubChem CID | 19351593 |
| CompTox Dashboard (EPA) | DTXSID60955941 |
- InChI: InChI=1S/C11H26NO2PS/c1-10(11(2,3)4)14-15(7,13)16-9-8-12(5)6/h10H,8-9H2,1-7H3 Key: HMEIQJRWLVTAFA-UHFFFAOYSA-N
- SMILES: CC(C(C)(C)C)OP(=O)(C)SCCN(C)C

Properties
| Chemical formula | C_{11}H_{26}NO_{2}PS |
| Molar mass | 267.37 g·mol^{−1} |

Hazards
- Occupational safety and health (OHS/OSH)
| Main hazards | Extremely toxic |
- Except where otherwise noted, data are given for materials in their standard state (at 25 °C [77 °F], 100 kPa). Infobox references

VT is an extremely toxic organophosphate nerve agent of the V-series. VT is a isomer of the VX and EA-5478 is the 2-ethylsulfanylethyl analogue.

== See also ==
- EA-5488
- V-sub x
- VP (nerve agent)
