= Oxon (chemical) =

Organic compound

Parathion (left) and its oxon, paraoxon (right)

An oxon is an organic compound derived from another chemical in which a phosphorus-sulfur bond in the parent chemical has been replaced by a phosphorus-oxygen bond in the derivative.

Important examples of oxons can be found in the family of pesticides known as organophosphates. Some of these chemicals, such as chlorpyrifos, diazinon, and parathion, do not manifest their main toxicity in their original form. Rather, an animal's liver replaces a phosphorus-sulfur bond with a phosphorus-oxygen bond, turning these chemicals into oxons. The oxons then inhibit the acetylcholinesterase, causing acetylcholine to accumulate uncontrollably, wreaking havoc on the animal's nervous system.

== See also ==
- Paraoxon
- Chlorpyrifos oxon
