= Chlorobenzilate =

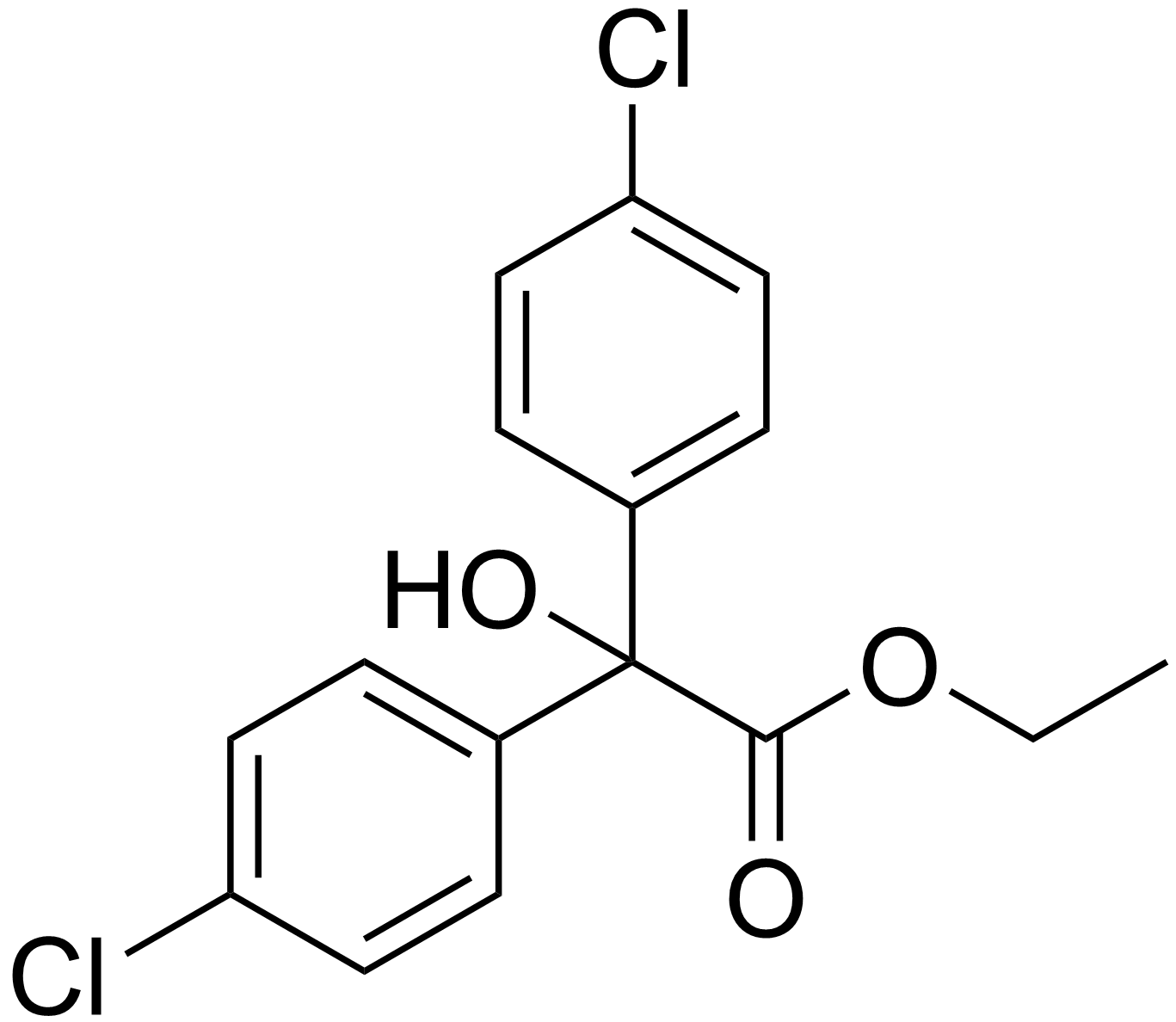

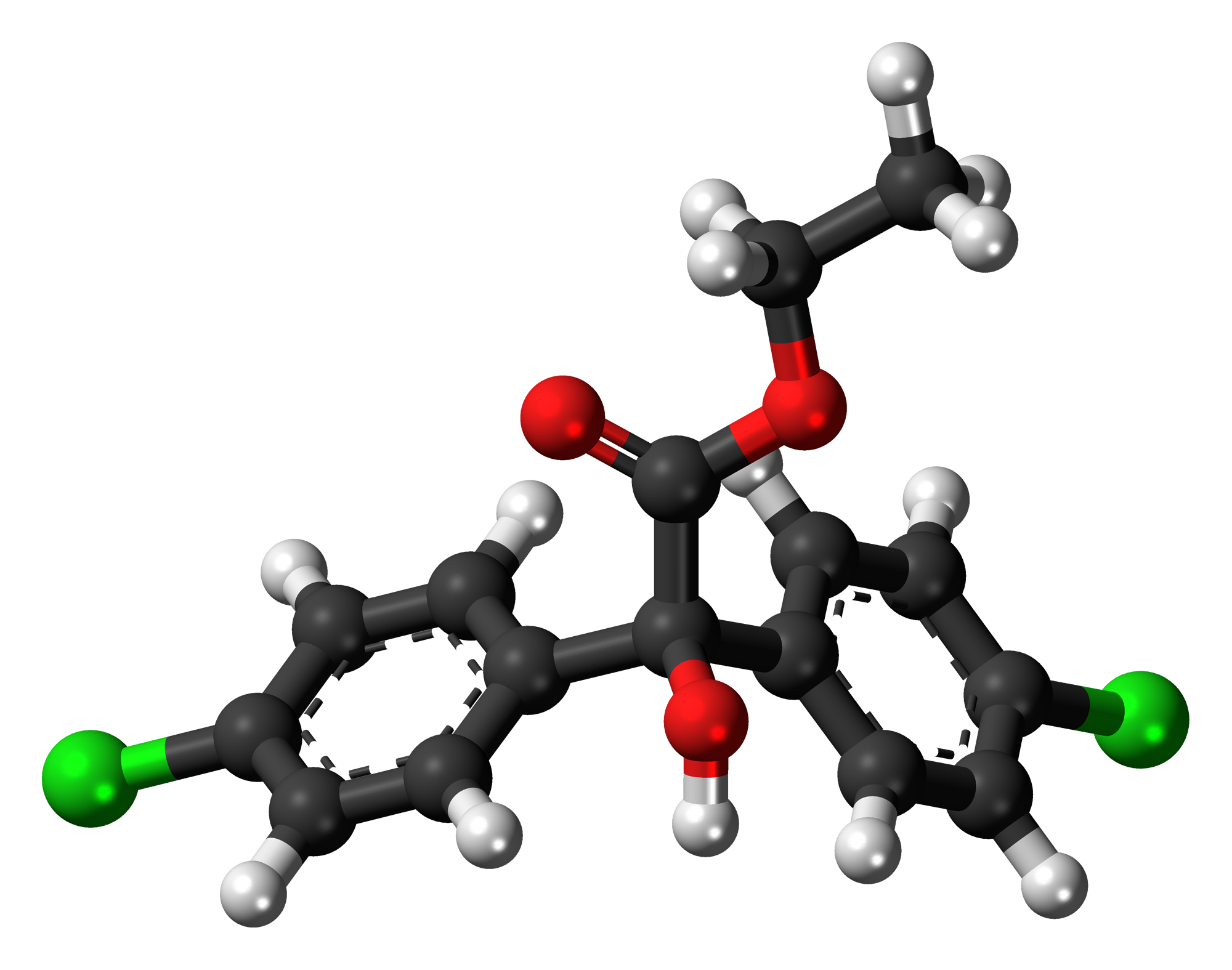

Names
- Preferred IUPAC name Ethyl bis(4-chlorophenyl)hydroxyacetate
- Other names Chlorbenzylate; Chlorobenzylate

Identifiers
CAS Number	510-15-6
3D model (JSmol)	Interactive image
ChEBI	CHEBI:34626
ChEMBL	ChEMBL539904
ChemSpider	10085
ECHA InfoCard	100.007.374
EC Number	208-110-2
KEGG	C14574
PubChem CID	10522
RTECS number	DD2275000
UNII	H850P004CZ
UN number	2996
CompTox Dashboard (EPA)	DTXSID9020299
- InChI: InChI=1/C16H14Cl2O3/c1-2-21-15(19)16(20,11-3-7-13(17)8-4-11)12-5-9-14(18)10-6-12/h3-10,20H,2H2,1H3 Key: RAPBNVDSDCTNRC-UHFFFAOYAH
- SMILES: Clc1ccc(cc1)C(O)(c2ccc(Cl)cc2)C(=O)OCC

Properties
Chemical formula	C_{16}H_{14}Cl_{2}O_{3}
Molar mass	325.19 g·mol^{−1}
Appearance	Colorless to pale yellow solid
Density	1.28 g/cm^{3}
Melting point	37 °C (99 °F; 310 K)

Hazards
- GHS labelling
Pictograms	(GHS07: Exclamation mark) (GHS09: Environmental hazard)
Signal word	Warning
Hazard statements	H302, H410
Precautionary statements	P264, P270, P273, P301+P312, P330, P391, P501
- Except where otherwise noted, data are given for materials in their standard state (at 25 °C [77 °F], 100 kPa). Infobox references

Chlorobenzilate is a pesticide that is not currently used in the United States or Europe. It was originally developed by Ciba-Geigy and introduced in 1952. It was used as an acaricide against mites on citrus trees, including deciduous fruit trees. It has been detected as a residue on tomatoes found in Japanese markets in 2005. It is a non-systemic pesticide that works through contact and as a neurotoxin: it disrupts the functioning of the nervous system.

In the pure state, chlorobenzilate is a colorless to pale yellow solid, but the commercial product is a brownish liquid. It is only slightly soluble in water, but miscible with acetone, toluene and methanol.

== Toxicity ==
There is no data on the carcinogenic effects of chlorobenzilate in humans. However, when mice were administered the substance orally, carcinogenic effects were observed. The U.S. Environmental Protection Agency has therefore classified chlorobenzilate as a probable human carcinogen (Group B2). The International Agency for Research on Cancer has concluded that there is insufficient information available to evaluate the carcinogenicity of chlorobenzilate in humans.

Chlorobenzilate is a persistent organic pollutant and is very toxic to aquatic invertebrates.

== Regulation ==
After carcinogenicity was established in mice, the use of chlorobenzilate was banned in the United States in 1979, except for citrus cultivation. After 1999, it was banned completely. In the European Union, its use is also currently banned.

International trade in chlorobenzilate is regulated by the Rotterdam Convention.
