= Demeton-S-methyl =

Names
- Preferred IUPAC name S-[2-(Ethylsulfanyl)ethyl] O,O-dimethyl phosphorothioate
- Other names 1-(Dimethoxyphosphorylthio)-2-(ethylthio)ethane; S-[2-(Ethylthio)ethyl] O,O-dimethyl phosphorothioate, Demeton methyl; O,O-Dimethyl 2-ethylmercaptoethyl thiophosphate; Metasystox; Methyl mercaptophos; Methyl systox

Identifiers
CAS Number	919-86-8
3D model (JSmol)	Interactive image
Beilstein Reference	1707311
ChEBI	CHEBI:38624
ChEMBL	ChEMBL1898805
ChemSpider	12938
ECHA InfoCard	100.011.866
EC Number	213-052-6
KEGG	C18655
PubChem CID	13526
RTECS number	TG1750000
UNII	HU8BO5S9WK
UN number	3018
CompTox Dashboard (EPA)	DTXSID5037521
- InChI: InChI=1S/C6H15O3PS2/c1-4-11-5-6-12-10(7,8-2)9-3/h4-6H2,1-3H3 Key: WEBQKRLKWNIYKK-UHFFFAOYSA-N; InChI=1/C6H15O3PS2/c1-4-11-5-6-12-10(7,8-2)9-3/h4-6H2,1-3H3 Key: WEBQKRLKWNIYKK-UHFFFAOYAF
- SMILES: O=P(OC)(SCCSCC)OC

Properties
Chemical formula	C_{6}H_{15}O_{3}PS_{2}
Molar mass	230.28 g/mol
Appearance	Oily, colorless to pale-yellow liquid
Density	1.2 g/cm^{3}
Boiling point	118 °C (244 °F; 391 K)
Solubility in water	0.33 g/100 ml (20 °C (68 °F; 293 K))
Vapor pressure	0.0004 mmHg (20 °C (68 °F; 293 K))

Hazards
- GHS labelling
Pictograms	(GHS06: Toxic) (GHS09: Environmental hazard)
Signal word	Danger
Hazard statements	H301, H311, H411
Precautionary statements	P264, P270, P273, P280, P301+P310, P302+P352, P312, P321, P322, P330, P361, P363, P391, P405, P501
- NIOSH (US health exposure limits)
PEL (Permissible)	N.D.
REL (Recommended)	TWA 0.5 mg/m^{3} [skin]
IDLH (Immediate danger)	N.D.
- Except where otherwise noted, data are given for materials in their standard state (at 25 °C [77 °F], 100 kPa). verify (what is ?) Infobox references

Demeton-S-methyl is an organic compound with the molecular formula C_{6}H_{15}O_{3}PS_{2}. It was used as an organothiophosphate acaricide and organothiophosphate insecticide. It is flammable. With prolonged storage, Demeton-S-methyl becomes more toxic due to formation of a sulfonium derivative which has greater affinity to the human form of the acetylcholinesterase enzyme, and this may present a hazard in agricultural use.

== History ==
Demeton-S-methyl was first described in 1950 by Schrader and was widely adopted as a pesticide because of the lower toxicity to humans than the previously used demeton. In its beginning days, it was mostly used together with demeton-O-methyl in an O:S ratio of 70:30. From 1957 onward, only pure demeton-S-methyl was used. Because of its high toxicity and severe toxic effects to humans, demeton-S-methyl is now classified as a highly toxic substance by the World Health Organization and is banned from agricultural use worldwide.

== Structure and reactivity ==
Demeton-S-Methyl is a compound that is closely related to VX in terms of structure. The structure is C_{6}H_{15}O_{3}PS_{2}. Demeton-S-Methyl has a molecular weight of 230.28 g/mol. It appears as a colourless to slightly yellow coloured oily liquid with a garlic like odor. Its density is 1.2 g/cm^{3}, which makes it slightly heavier than water. The melting points and boiling points are <25 °C (<77 °F) and 118 °C (244 °F) respectively, although the compound decomposes before reaching the boiling point. The relatively low 0,0004 mmHg (at 20 °C (68 °F; 293 K)) means Demeton-S-Methyl will vaporize very slowly and mostly stay as a liquid. Demeton-S-Methyl is less stable than its predecessor Demeton, but it is used instead because of the lower toxicity to humans. Demeton-S-methyl is hydrolyzed quickly in alkaline media. Demeton-S-methyl is readily soluble in water and most organic compounds.

== Synthesis ==
There are three ways of synthesizing Demeton-S-methyl. It can be made by a reaction between Thiodiglycol and dimethyl thiophosphate. Here the sulfur in dimethyl thiophosphate attacks on one of the oxygens of thiodiglycol. One of the oxygens of dimethyl thiophosphate in turn forms a double bond with the phosphate and losing its hydrogen which forms water with the hydroxyl on the other side of the thiodiglycol. The second synthesis route is by alkylation of Dimethyl dithiophosphoric acid with 2-(ethylmercapto)-ethyl chloride. The third way is through the reaction of 2-(ethylthio)-ethanol, which is similar to thiodiglycol minus one of the hydroxyl groups, and O,O-dimethyl phosphochlorothioate. This happens through alcohol chlorination, hydrolysis and dehydrochlorination respectively.

== Available forms ==
Demeton-S-methyl is still available as a solution, however its use is banned in most countries because of the severe toxicity.

== Mechanism of action ==
Demeton-S-methyl inhibits cholinesterase, which takes care of the breakdown of acetylcholine (AChE). In the presence of Demeton-S-methyl, an accumulation of AChE occurs, which can result in impeded neurotransmission. This can lead to impaired muscle function and even suffocation resulting in death.

== Metabolism ==
Animal experiments show that almost all demeton-S-methyl derivatives are excreted through urine. Most of the demeton-S-methyl is converted to demeton-S-methyl sulfoxide, where an oxygen group is added to the sulfur in the side chain. This sulfoxide can then be further metabolised by adding another oxygen group, creating demeton-S-methyl sulfone. Another pathway to metabolise demeton-S-methyl is to demethylate the oxygen group(s) of demeton. Again, this demethylated form can occur in an sulfoxide and sulfone form. Lastly, de-esterification of the O-methylphosphoric ester group can occur which will be followed by methylation and sulfoxidation. This will lead to the formation of methyl sulfinyl-2-ethyl sulfinyl ethane and methyl sulfinyl-2-ethyl sulfonyl ethane.

== Uses ==
Demeton-S-Methyl is an organic phosphorus compound that has been used as an effective insecticide and acaricide in agriculture, mainly against plant-sucking arthropod pests. It was applied for control of aphids, mites, and whiteflies on fruit, vegetables, potatoes, beet and hops. Demeton-S-Methyl is absorbed and distributed within the plant, allowing concentrations to reach high enough levels to kill the insects that feed on the plant by sucking its juices.

In agriculture, methyl demeton was used in a mixture of the O-isomer and the S-isomer in an approximate ratio of 70:30. However, the S-isomer was found to be more toxic against insects than the O-isomer. When the purified S-isomer form was introduced and availability rose, it replaced the mixture in agriculture.

== Effects on human health ==
A lot of data on the toxicity of methyl-S-demeton comes from case studies, often with persons who have been exposed to the chemical occupationally. Methyl-S-demeton was sprayed on the plants by sprayers, who were often temporarily employed. In a study with sprayers that used methyl-S-demeton occupationally the health implications were assessed. The sprayers worked 8 hours a day, and symptoms of intoxication occurred after one to 18 days of exposure. The main signs of toxicity included drowsiness, vomiting, abdominal pain, diarrhoea, nausea, fatigue, headache, respiratory problems, salivation and lachrymation. Serum-cholinesterase levels were lowered by 64% in 25 sprayers when compared to control persons.

In one case of poisoning, ingestion of 50 to 500 mg of methyl-S-demeton/kg body weight resulted in acute cardiovascular collapse and death 83 hours after exposure. A second case-study involves a farmer who was exposed to the chemical on at least 23 occasions for periods varying from 20 minutes to 6 3/4 hours, mostly during his work as a marker in aerial spraying but also during the preparation of the chemical. He developed headaches, nausea and dizziness during the working week which subsided during the weekend. Later, he developed anorexia and had difficulty performing simple cognitive tasks. He was admitted to the hospital where it was found that his serum-cholinesterase levels were very low. He was discharged when these levels rose to acceptable levels. In another case, a two-year-old boy was admitted to the hospital after ingestion of 10 ml (0.35 imp fl oz; 0.34 US fl oz) of demeton-S-methyl. Symptoms included excessive salivation, vomiting, bronchial hypersecretion, muscarinic effects on pulse rate and pupil size, and slight bradycardia. In this case, too, serum-cholinesterase levels were significantly lowered, but returned to baseline after admission to the hospital. Lastly, one case of lethal suicide intoxication with demeton-S-methyl has been reported.

== Toxicity ==
The Joint FAO/WHO Meeting on Pesticide Residues (JMPR) concluded that demeton-S-methyl is a highly toxic organophosphorus insecticide. Effects due to chronic exposure are unlikely to occur. Furthermore, demeton-S-methyl does not persist in the environment and is not accumulated by organisms. However, demeton-S-methyl has a high acute toxicity towards aquatic invertebrates and is also toxic to birds and fish. The JMPR recommended ADI (acceptable daily intake) is 0.0003 mg/kg body weight. The LD_{50} values of demeton-S-methyl for mammals range from 7 to 100 mg/kg body weight, depending on the route of administration and species.

Oral LD_{50} values of demeton-S-methyl in rats were between 33 and 129 mg/kg body weight. When the toxin was inhaled, the LC_{50} with 4 hours of exposure for Wistar rats was found to be 310 mg/m^{3} air for males, and 210 mg/m^{3} air for females. In dietary studies on dogs, mice and rats, NOAEL (No Observed Adverse Effect Level) values of 1 mg/kg diet were found. These values are equal to a NOAEL range of 0.036 to 0.24 mg/kg body weight per day.

== Analysis ==
Hrynko et al. 2021 provides an analysis method for detection of Demeton-S-methyl and Demeton-S-methyl-sulfone intoxication of bees.

== See also ==
- Demeton
