= Disulfoton =

Names
- Preferred IUPAC name O,O′-Diethyl S-[2-(ethylsulfanyl)ethyl] phosphorodithioate
- Other names O,O-Diethyl S-2-(ethylthio)ethyl phosphorodithioate, Di-Syston, Thiodemeton

Identifiers
CAS Number	298-04-4
3D model (JSmol)	Interactive image
Beilstein Reference	1709167
ChEBI	CHEBI:38661
ChEMBL	ChEMBL1332314
ChemSpider	3006
ECHA InfoCard	100.005.505
EC Number	206-054-3
KEGG	C18400
PubChem CID	3118
RTECS number	TD9275000
UNII	3CY5EKL6MT
UN number	3018 2783
CompTox Dashboard (EPA)	DTXSID0022018
- InChI: InChI=1S/C8H19O2PS3/c1-4-9-11(12,10-5-2)14-8-7-13-6-3/h4-8H2,1-3H3 Key: DOFZAZXDOSGAJZ-UHFFFAOYSA-N; InChI=1/C8H19O2PS3/c1-4-9-11(12,10-5-2)14-8-7-13-6-3/h4-8H2,1-3H3 Key: DOFZAZXDOSGAJZ-UHFFFAOYAD
- SMILES: S=P(OCC)(SCCSCC)OCC

Properties
Chemical formula	C_{8}H_{19}O_{2}PS_{3}
Molar mass	274.404
Appearance	Oily, colorless to yellow liquid
Odor	Characteristic, sulfurous
Density	1.14 g/mL
Solubility in water	0.03% (22.7°C)
Vapor pressure	0.0002 mmHg (20°C)

Hazards
- Occupational safety and health (OHS/OSH)
Main hazards	Toxic
- GHS labelling
Pictograms	(GHS06: Toxic) (GHS09: Environmental hazard)
Signal word	Danger
Hazard statements	H300, H310, H410
Precautionary statements	P262, P264, P270, P273, P280, P301+P316, P302+P352, P316, P321, P330, P361+P364, P391, P405, P501
Flash point	> 82 °C; 180 °F; 355 K
- NIOSH (US health exposure limits)
PEL (Permissible)	none
REL (Recommended)	TWA 0.1 mg/m^{3} [skin]
IDLH (Immediate danger)	N.D.
- Except where otherwise noted, data are given for materials in their standard state (at 25 °C [77 °F], 100 kPa). verify (what is ?) Infobox references

Disulfoton is an organophosphate acetylcholinesterase inhibitor used as an insecticide. It is manufactured under the name Di-Syston by Bayer CropScience. Disulfoton in its pure form is a colorless oil but the technical product used in vegetable fields is dark and yellowish with a sulfur odor. Disulfoton is processed as a liquid into carrier granules. These granules are mixed with fertilizer and clay to be made into a spike, designed to be driven into the ground. The pesticide is absorbed over time by the roots and translocated to all parts of the plant. The pesticide acts as a cholinesterase inhibitor and gives long lasting control.

The use of the substance has been restricted by the US government. Bayer, the manufacturer, exited the US market December 31, 2009.

== Synthesis ==
Disulfoton is synthesized by sulfide formation of 2-ethylthioethanol + O,O-diethyl hydrogen phosphorodithioate with beta-chloroethyl thioethyl ether.

== Metabolites ==
Oxidation of Disulfoton happens rapidly and metabolizes disulfoton into sulfones and sulfoxides, oxidation to oxygen analogs and/or hydrolysis to produce a corresponding phosphorothionate or phosphate. Microsomal enzymes are being inhibited during the metabolism.

== Mechanism of action ==
Organophosphorus pesticides like Disulfoton inhibit esterase enzyme activity like choline esterase. These types of pesticides can also directly interact with the biochemical receptors of acetylcholine.

Organophosphates in general poisons mammals and insects by phosphorylating the acetylcholinesterase enzyme at nerve endings resulting in loss of function of the enzyme. This allows the accumulation of the neurotransmitter acetylcholine in cholinergic neuroeffector junctions, skeletal myoneural junctions, and autonomic ganglia. This refers to the type of receptors of acetylcholine, the muscarinic and nicotinic effects respectively. Thus organophosphates also impairs nerve impulse transmission.

Disulfoton can be absorbed via ingestion, inhalation or penetration of the skin as it can be rapidly absorbed via mucous membranes. When disulfoton is absorbed, it will be distributed via the blood circulation and undergo hydrolytic degradation. This mainly happens in the liver or kidneys but in other tissues as well. Disulfoton is excreted in different metabolites via the urine.

== Toxicity ==
Disulfoton is classified as a super toxic substance. The estimated oral lethal dose in humans is less than 5 mg/kg, which is analog to seven drops for a 70 kg person.

Not only oral intake, but also skin contact and inhalation are fatal because of acute toxicity. Disulfoton is also very toxic to aquatic life and forms an acute hazard with long lasting effects.

=== Symptoms ===
Signs of disulfoton toxicity includes headaches, cyanosis, weakness, fatigue, nausea, vomiting, abdominal cramps, diarrhea, blurred vision, mental confusion, loss of muscle coordination and sialorrhea. Death can occur when respiratory arrest ensues from failure of the respiratory muscles. Other symptoms found in a patient with an unknown quantity of disulfoton were intra-alveolar bleeding, blood in the bronchus, edema of the lungs and swelling of the glomerulus.

=== Treatment ===
The treatment of the granular form of disulfoton poisoning should be with repetitive or prolonged gastric and intestinal lavage (washing out of the body cavity). Also charcoal and a continuous intravenous infusion of pralidoxime iodide in addition to atropine sulfate.

== See also ==
- Demeton, its phosphorothioate equivalent
