= Parathion methyl =

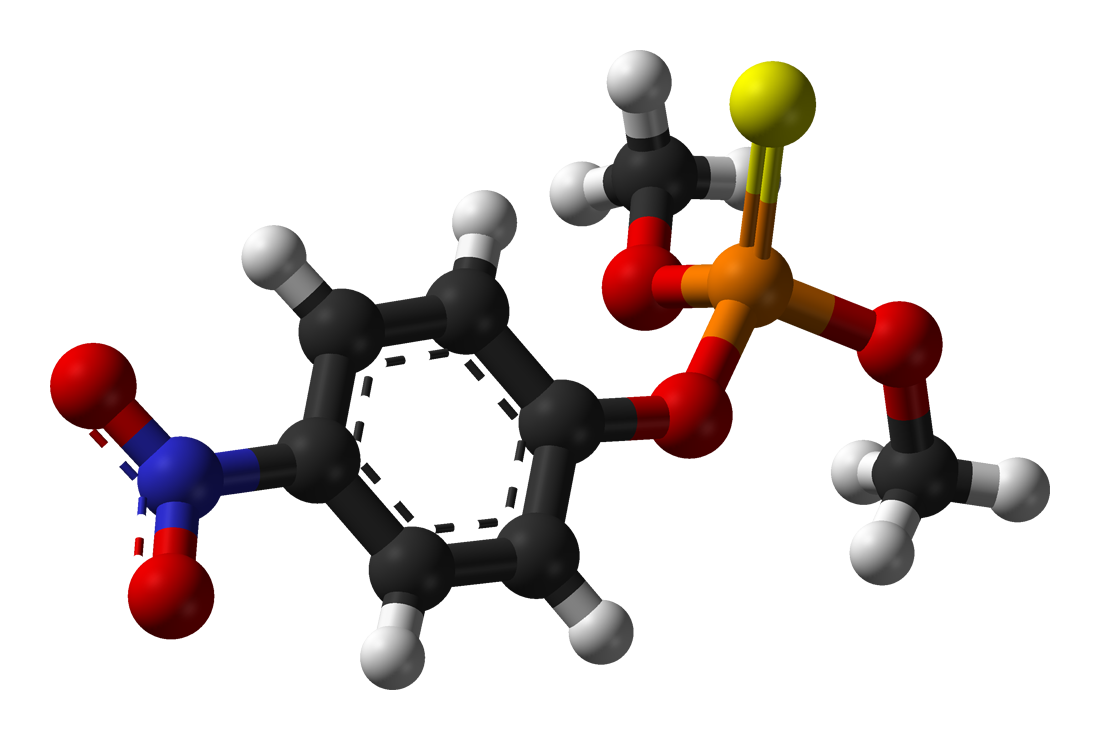

Names
- IUPAC name O,O-Dimethyl-O-p-nitrophenylphosphorothioate
- Other names Azophos, Methyl parathion, O,O-Dimethyl O-4-nitrophenyl phosphorothioate, O,O-Dimethyl-p-nitrophenylthionophosphate

Identifiers
CAS Number	298-00-0
3D model (JSmol)	Interactive image
ChemSpider	3987
ECHA InfoCard	100.005.501
EC Number	015-035-00-7
PubChem CID	4130
RTECS number	TG0175000
UNII	41BCL2O91D
UN number	2783
CompTox Dashboard (EPA)	DTXSID1020855
- InChI: InChI=1S/C8H10NO5PS/c1-12-15(16,13-2)14-8-5-3-7(4-6-8)9(10)11/h3-6H,1-2H3 Key: RLBIQVVOMOPOHC-UHFFFAOYSA-N; InChI=1/C8H10NO5PS/c1-12-15(16,13-2)14-8-5-3-7(4-6-8)9(10)11/h3-6H,1-2H3 Key: RLBIQVVOMOPOHC-UHFFFAOYAW
- SMILES: COP(=S)(OC)Oc1ccc(cc1)[N+](=O)[O-]

Properties
Chemical formula	(CH_{3}O)_{2}P(S)OC_{6}H_{4}NO_{2}
Molar mass	263.2 g/mol
Appearance	White to tan, crystalline solid or powder
Odor	pungent, garlic-like
Density	1.36 g/mL (20°C)
Melting point	37 °C; 99 °F; 310 K
Boiling point	143 °C; 289 °F; 416 K
Solubility in water	0.006% (25°C)
Vapor pressure	0.00001 mmHg (20°C)

Hazards
- Occupational safety and health (OHS/OSH)
Main hazards	reactive with strong oxidizers and water
- Lethal dose or concentration (LD, LC)
LD_{50} (median dose)	67 mg/kg (rat, dermal); 10–25 mg/kg (male rat, oral); 24 mg/kg (female rat, oral)
- NIOSH (US health exposure limits)
PEL (Permissible)	none
REL (Recommended)	TWA 0.2 mg/m^{3} [skin]
IDLH (Immediate danger)	N.D.
- Except where otherwise noted, data are given for materials in their standard state (at 25 °C [77 °F], 100 kPa). Infobox references

Parathion methyl, or methyl parathion, is an organophosphate insecticide, possessing an organothiophosphate group. It is structurally very similar to parathion-ethyl. It is not allowed for sale and import in nearly all countries around the world, while a few allow it under subject to specified conditions only.

== Applications ==
Parathion methyl is used as an insecticide on crops, including cotton.

== Trade names ==
Penncap-M, Metacide.

== Safety ==
People can be exposed to parathion methyl in the workplace by breathing it in, getting it on their skin, swallowing it, or getting it in their eyes. Since it is an acetylcholinesterase inhibitor, symptoms of exposure to parathion methyl include irritated eyes and skin, nausea and vomiting, abdominal pain, diarrhea, salivation, feeling weak and tired, headache, runny nose, tightness in the chest, blurry vision, pupil constriction, irregular heartbeat, muscle twitches (fasciculation), and difficulty breathing.

In the United States, the Occupational Safety and Health Administration (OSHA) has not set a legal limit (permissible exposure limit) for parathion methyl exposure in the workplace. The National Institute for Occupational Safety and Health (NIOSH) has set a recommended exposure limit (REL) of 0.2 mg/m^{3} over an 8-hour workday.

== Classifications and restrictions ==
Parathion methyl has been restricted for many years. It is classified as Extremely Hazardous (Ia) by the World Health Organization and it is classified as Severely Hazardous by the Rotterdam Convention. It is not allowed for sale and import in nearly all countries around the world, while a few allow it under subject to specified conditions only.
