= Binapacryl =

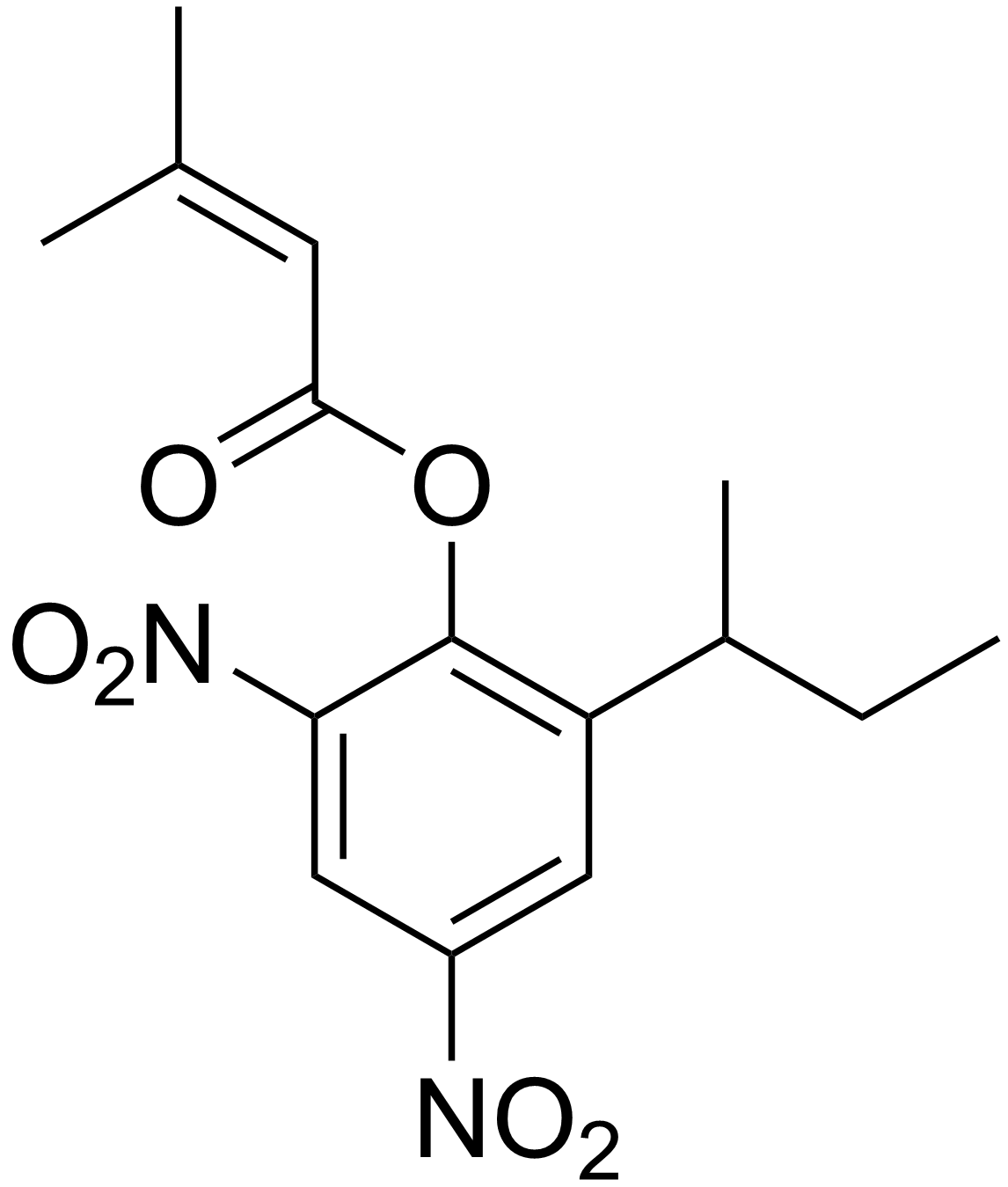

Names
- Preferred IUPAC name 2-(Butan-2-yl)-4,6-dinitrophenyl 3-methylbut-2-enoate
- Other names 2-[(2RS)-Butan-2-yl]-4,6-dinitrophenyl 3-methylbut-2-enoate (RS)-2-(Butan-2-yl)-4,6-dinitrophenyl 3-methylbut-2-enoate (RS)-2-sec-Butyl-4,6-dinitrophenyl 3-methylbut-2-enoate Dapacryl; Morocide; Morrocid; Acricid; Endosan; Ambox; Dinoseb methacrylate

Identifiers
CAS Number	485-31-4
3D model (JSmol)	Interactive image
ChEBI	CHEBI:82153
ChEMBL	ChEMBL3182974
ChemSpider	9817
ECHA InfoCard	100.006.921
EC Number	207-612-9
KEGG	C19022
PubChem CID	10234
RTECS number	GQ5600000
UNII	4X685BB13A
UN number	2779
CompTox Dashboard (EPA)	DTXSID9040269
- InChI: InChI=1S/C15H18N2O6/c1-5-10(4)12-7-11(16(19)20)8-13(17(21)22)15(12)23-14(18)6-9(2)3/h6-8,10H,5H2,1-4H3 Key: ZRDUSMYWDRPZRM-UHFFFAOYSA-N; InChI=1/C15H18N2O6/c1-5-10(4)12-7-11(16(19)20)8-13(17(21)22)15(12)23-14(18)6-9(2)3/h6-8,10H,5H2,1-4H3 Key: ZRDUSMYWDRPZRM-UHFFFAOYAH
- SMILES: O=C(Oc1c(cc(cc1C(C)CC)[N+]([O-])=O)[N+]([O-])=O)\C=C(/C)C

Properties
Chemical formula	C_{15}H_{18}N_{2}O_{6}
Molar mass	322.317 g·mol^{−1}
Density	1.2 g/cm^{3}
Melting point	66 to 67 °C (151 to 153 °F; 339 to 340 K)
Solubility in water	Insoluble

Hazards
- GHS labelling
Pictograms	(GHS07: Exclamation mark) (GHS08: Health hazard) (GHS09: Environmental hazard)
Signal word	Danger
Hazard statements	H302, H312, H360, H410
Precautionary statements	P201, P202, P264, P270, P273, P280, P281, P301+P312, P302+P352, P308+P313, P312, P322, P330, P363, P391, P405, P501
- Except where otherwise noted, data are given for materials in their standard state (at 25 °C [77 °F], 100 kPa). verify (what is ?) Infobox references

Binapacryl was used as a miticide and fungicide. Chemically, it is an ester derivative of dinoseb. Although binapacryl has low toxicity itself, it is readily metabolized to form dinoseb, which is highly toxic.

International trade in binapacryl is regulated by the Rotterdam Convention; it has been withdrawn as a pesticide, since products were highly toxic to mammals, fish and aquatic invertebrates.
