= Mevinphos =

Names
- IUPAC name 2-methoxycarbonyl-1-methylvinyl dimethyl phosphate

Identifiers
CAS Number	7786-34-7
3D model (JSmol)	Interactive image
ChemSpider	9185
ECHA InfoCard	100.029.177
PubChem CID	9560
UNII	14ZYO4IKXT
CompTox Dashboard (EPA)	DTXSID2032683
- InChI: InChI=1S/C7H13O6P/c1-6(5-7(8)10-2)13-14(9,11-3)12-4/h5H,1-4H3 Key: GEPDYQSQVLXLEU-UHFFFAOYSA-N; InChI=1/C7H13O6P/c1-6(5-7(8)10-2)13-14(9,11-3)12-4/h5H,1-4H3 Key: GEPDYQSQVLXLEU-UHFFFAOYAN
- SMILES: CC(=CC(=O)OC)OP(=O)(OC)OC

Properties
Chemical formula	C_{7}H_{13}O_{6}P
Molar mass	224.149 g·mol^{−1}
Appearance	Colorless liquid
Density	1.25 g/mL
Melting point	21 °C (70 °F; 294 K) (E isomer); 6.9 °C (Z isomer)
Solubility in water	miscible
Vapor pressure	0.003 mmHg (20°C)

Hazards
Flash point	175 °C; 347 °F; 448 K
- Lethal dose or concentration (LD, LC)
LD_{50} (median dose)	3 mg/kg (rat, oral); 4 mg/kg (mouse, oral); 6-7 mg/kg (rat, oral)
LC_{50} (median concentration)	14 ppm (rat, 1 hr)
- NIOSH (US health exposure limits)
PEL (Permissible)	TWA 0.1 mg/m^{3} [skin]
REL (Recommended)	TWA 0.01 ppm (0.1 mg/m^{3}) ST 0.03 ppm (0.3 mg/m^{3}) [skin]
IDLH (Immediate danger)	4 ppm
- Except where otherwise noted, data are given for materials in their standard state (at 25 °C [77 °F], 100 kPa). verify (what is ?) Infobox references

Mevinphos is a toxic organophosphate insecticide that acts as an acetylcholinesterase inhibitor to control insects in a wide range of crops. It was most commonly used for the control of chewing and sucking insects like aphids, grasshoppers, cutworms, leafhoppers, and caterpillars, as well as spider mites and ticks. Common synonym names are duraphos, fosdrin, menite, mevinfos, mevinox, phosdrin, and phosdrine. While there is no specific ban in the EU, it is not approved for use in any member nations. Nor is it approved for use in Canada. The EPA issued a Cancellation Order for all Mevinphos registrations on June 30, 1994, effectively banning its manufacture and use in the United States, all manufacture ceased shortly after, and its use was officially banned after February 28, 1995.

== Manufacture ==
Mevinphos is produced by the reaction of trimethyl phosphite with chloroacetoacetate.
