= Phosphamidon =

Names
- IUPAC name (E/Z)-[3-Chloro-4-(diethylamino)-4-oxobut-2-en-2-yl] dimethyl phosphate
- Other names: Apamidon; Dimecron; Dixon; Famfos; Merkon; Sundaram 1975

Identifiers
CAS Number	13171-21-6; 297-99-4 (E); 23783-98-4 (Z)
3D model (JSmol)	Interactive image
ChemSpider	23990
ECHA InfoCard	100.032.818
KEGG	C18689
PubChem CID	25750
UNII	7H857A6N6H; 54VR7A0BQD (E); HQ7958Q90Z (Z)
CompTox Dashboard (EPA)	DTXSID7021156
- InChI: InChI=1S/C10H19ClNO5P/c1-6-12(7-2)10(13)9(11)8(3)17-18(14,15-4)16-5/h6-7H2,1-5H3 Key: RGCLLPNLLBQHPF-UHFFFAOYSA-N; InChI=1/C10H19ClNO5P/c1-6-12(7-2)10(13)9(11)8(3)17-18(14,15-4)16-5/h6-7H2,1-5H3 Key: RGCLLPNLLBQHPF-UHFFFAOYAA
- SMILES: CCN(CC)C(=O)/C(=C(\C)/OP(=O)(OC)OC)/Cl

Properties
Chemical formula	C_{10}H_{19}ClNO_{5}P
Molar mass	299.69 g·mol^{−1}
Density	1.2132 g/cm^{3}
Boiling point	162 °C (324 °F; 435 K) (1.5 mmHg)
Solubility in water	Miscible

Hazards
- GHS labelling
Pictograms	(GHS06: Toxic) (GHS07: Exclamation mark) (GHS09: Environmental hazard)
Signal word	Danger
Hazard statements	H300, H311, H341, H410
Precautionary statements	P203, P262, P264, P270, P273, P280, P301+P316, P302+P352, P316, P318, P321, P330, P361+P364, P391, P405, P501
- Lethal dose or concentration (LD, LC)
LD_{50} (median dose)	13 mg/kg (mouse, oral); 6 mg/kg (mouse, IV); 20 mg/kg (rat, oral); 26 mg/kg (rat, subcut.)
- Except where otherwise noted, data are given for materials in their standard state (at 25 °C [77 °F], 100 kPa). verify (what is ?) Infobox references

Phosphamidon is an organophosphate insecticide first reported in 1960. It acts as a cholinesterase inhibitor.

The commercial product typically exists as a mixture of 70% (Z)-isomer and 30% (E)-isomer.

== Toxicity and regulation ==
Phosphamidon is very highly toxic to mammals and is listed as WHO Hazard Class Ia. A harvester developed symptoms of moderately severe poisoning after working in a field that had been sprayed with the chemical 2 weeks earlier. He collapsed and exhibited significant depression of serum cholinesterase, but recovered completely within 2 days after successful treatment with atropine. International trade of phosphamidon is covered by the Rotterdam Convention.
