= Paraoxon =

Chemical compound

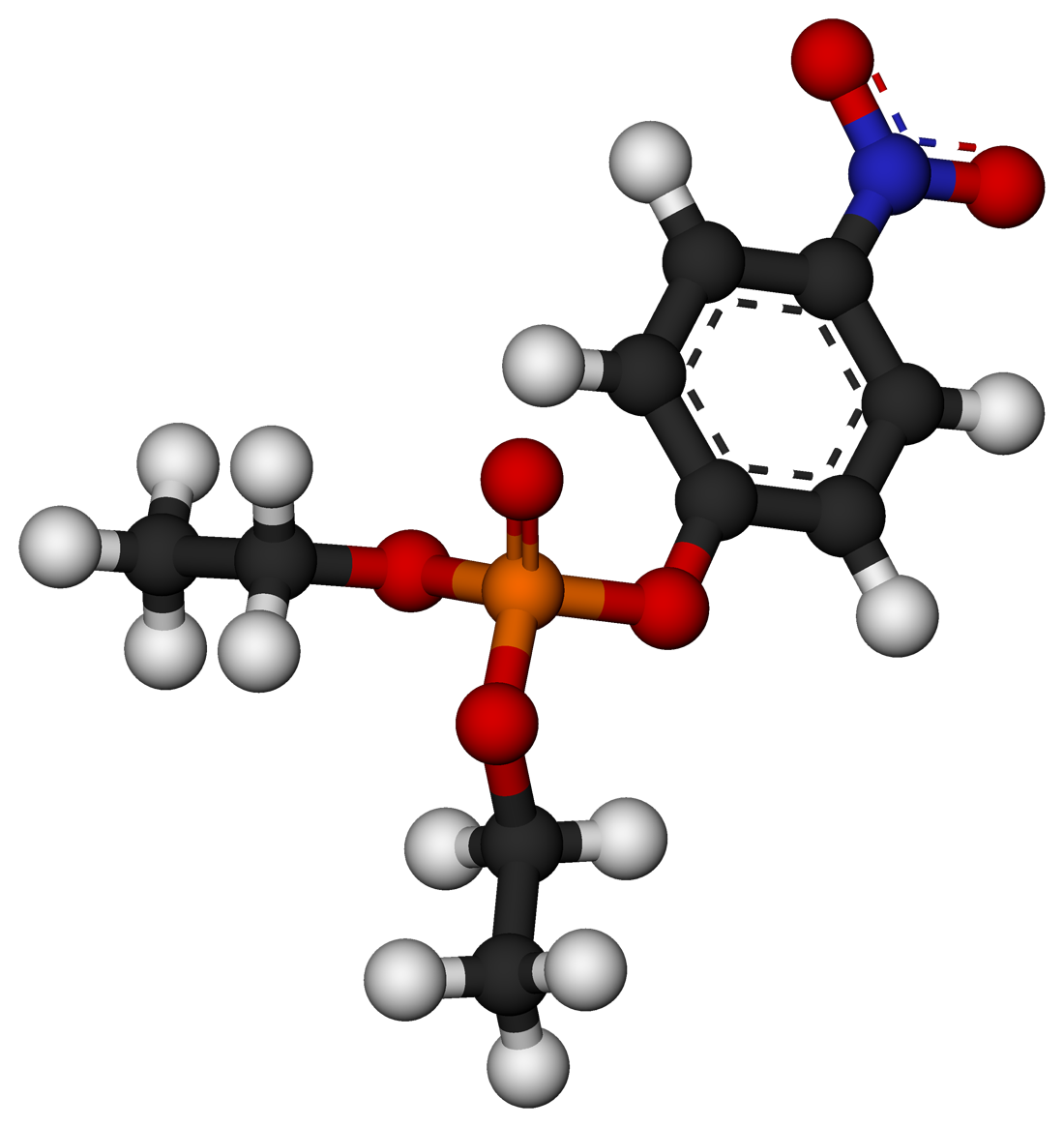

Clinical data
- ATC code: S01EB10 (WHO)

Legal status
- Legal status: In general: uncontrolled

Identifiers
- IUPAC name: Diethyl 4-nitrophenyl phosphate
- CAS Number: 311-45-5
- PubChem CID: 9395
- ChemSpider: 9026
- UNII: Q9CX8P80JW
- KEGG: D10529
- ChEBI: CHEBI:27827
- ChEMBL: ChEMBL23838
- CompTox Dashboard (EPA): DTXSID6024046
- ECHA InfoCard: 100.005.657

Chemical and physical data
- Formula: C_{10}H_{14}NO_{6}P
- Molar mass: 275.197 g·mol^{−1}
- 3D model (JSmol): Interactive image
- SMILES: [O-][N+](=O)c1ccc(OP(=O)(OCC)OCC)cc1
- InChI: InChI=1S/C10H14NO6P/c1-3-15-18(14,16-4-2)17-10-7-5-9(6-8-10)11(12)13/h5-8H,3-4H2,1-2H3; Key:WYMSBXTXOHUIGT-UHFFFAOYSA-N

Paraoxon is a parasympathomimetic drug which acts as an cholinesterase inhibitor. It is an organophosphate oxon, and the active metabolite of the insecticide parathion. It is also used as an ophthalmological drug against glaucoma. Paraoxon is one of the most potent acetylcholinesterase-inhibiting insecticides available, around 70% as potent as the nerve agent sarin, and so is now rarely used as an insecticide due to the risk of poisoning to humans and other animals. Paraoxon has been used by scientists to study acute and chronic effects of organophosphate intoxication. It is easily absorbed through skin, and was allegedly used as an assassination weapon by the apartheid-era South African chemical weapons program Project Coast.

EA-1370, isopropyl para-nitrophenyl methylphosphonate, is the conjunction of the nerve agent sarin with the para-nitrophenol derived leaving group of paraoxon. Contact with the fluoride ion in a polar-aprotic solvent regenerates it to sarin.

== See also ==
- Armine (chemical)
- Ethyl p-nitrophenyl 4-phenylbutylphosphonate
- O-isobutylarmine
- O-neopentyl p-nitrophenyl methylphosphonate
