= Ro 3-0419 =

Chemical compound

Names
- Preferred IUPAC name Diethyl quinolin-3-yl phosphate
- Other names 3-(Diethoxyphosphinyloxy)-quinoline

Identifiers
3D model (JSmol)	Interactive image
ChemSpider	2295246
PubChem CID	3029999
CompTox Dashboard (EPA)	DTXSID901020094
- InChI: InChI=1S/C13H16NO4P/c1-3-16-19(15,17-4-2)18-12-9-11-7-5-6-8-13(11)14-10-12/h5-10H,3-4H2,1-2H3 Key: LHRQAYKGKTYZRY-UHFFFAOYSA-N
- SMILES: CCOP(=O)(OCC)Oc1cc2ccccc2nc1

Properties
Chemical formula	C_{13}H_{16}NO_{4}P
Molar mass	281.248 g·mol^{−1}

Hazards
- Occupational safety and health (OHS/OSH)
Main hazards	Highly toxic
- Lethal dose or concentration (LD, LC)
LD_{50} (median dose)	1 mg/kg (mice, intravenous)
- Except where otherwise noted, data are given for materials in their standard state (at 25 °C [77 °F], 100 kPa). Infobox references

Ro 3-0419 is a highly toxic organophosphate acetylcholinesterase inhibitor. It is the neutral analog of Ro 3-0422. Although Ro 3-0419 is less potent than Ro 3-0422, it does not have a positively charged nitrogen atom, resulting in its ability to cross the blood brain barrier to inhibit cholinesterases in the brain. The intravenous LD_{50} of Ro 3-0419 is 1 mg/kg in mice.

== See also ==
- Ro 3-0422
