= V-sub x =

Names
- Preferred IUPAC name O-Ethyl S-[2-(ethylsulfanyl)ethyl] methylphosphonothioate
- Other names GD-7

Identifiers
CAS Number	556-75-2
3D model (JSmol)	Interactive image
ChemSpider	83780
PubChem CID	92808
UNII	46R5CK7FL9
CompTox Dashboard (EPA)	DTXSID90875709
- InChI: InChI=1S/C7H17O2PS2/c1-4-9-10(3,8)12-7-6-11-5-2/h4-7H2,1-3H3 Key: FSBPLRBNEBOJLL-UHFFFAOYSA-N
- SMILES: CCOP(=O)(C)SCCSCC

Properties
Chemical formula	C_{7}H_{17}O_{2}PS_{2}
Molar mass	228.30 g·mol^{−1}
- Except where otherwise noted, data are given for materials in their standard state (at 25 °C [77 °F], 100 kPa). Infobox references

V-sub _{x}, also known as GD-7, is an organophosphate nerve agent of the V-series, the phosphonate analog of the organophosphate insecticide demeton. EA-5478 is the pinacolyl analogue.

== See also ==
- VX (nerve agent)
- Demeton
