= Parathion =

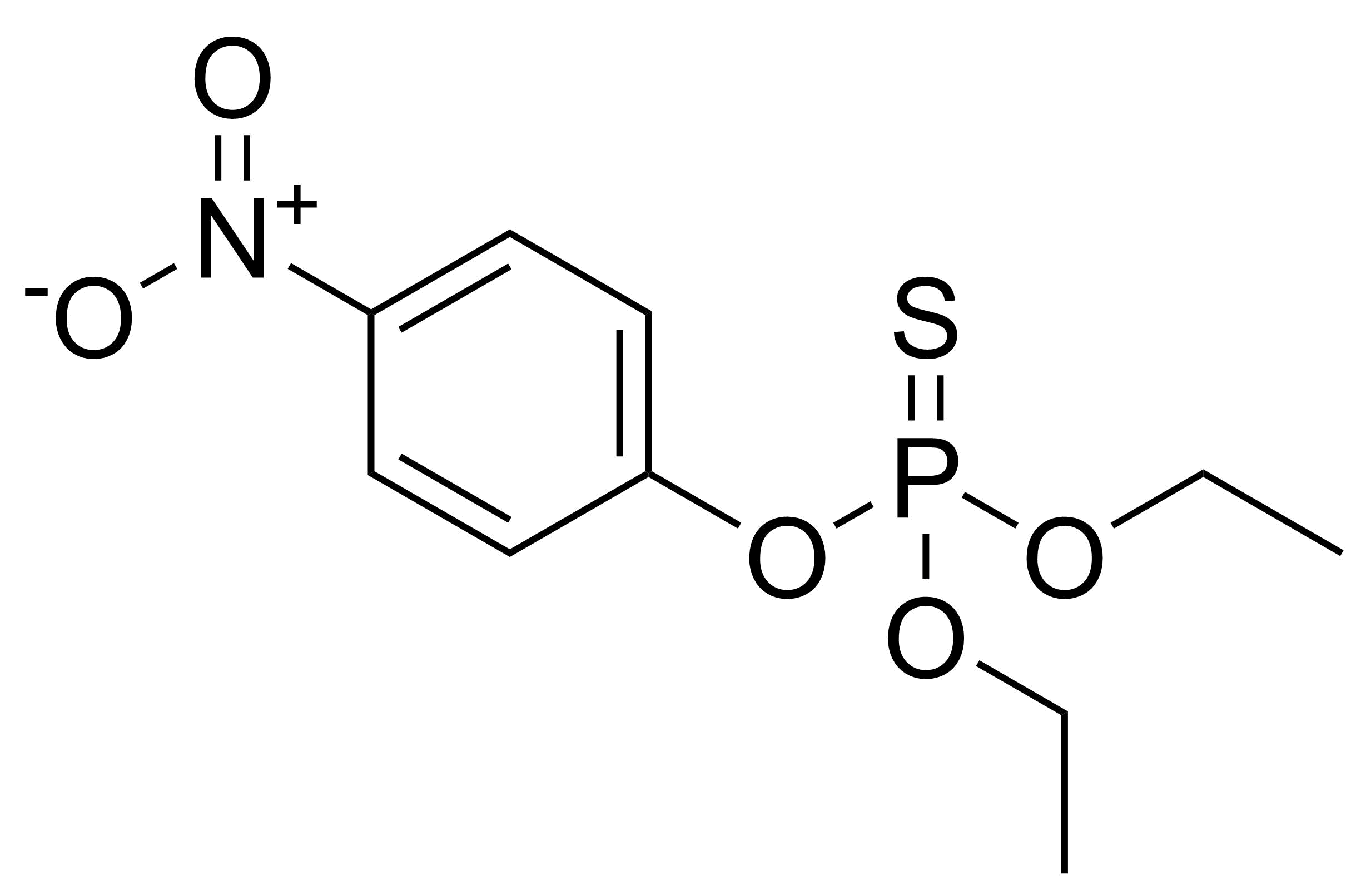

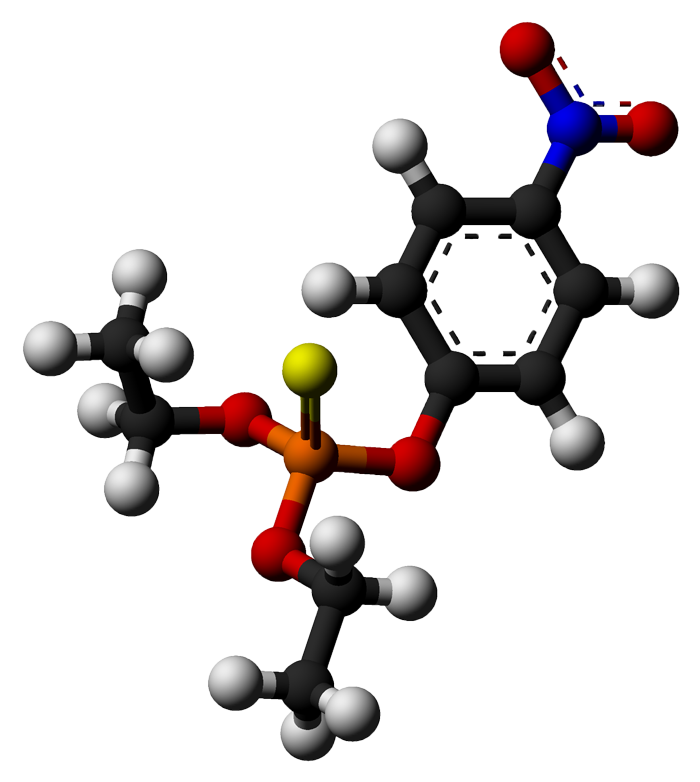

Names
- Preferred IUPAC name O,O-Diethyl O-(4-nitrophenyl) phosphorothioate
- Other names E605

Identifiers
CAS Number	56-38-2
3D model (JSmol)	Interactive image
Beilstein Reference	2059093
ChEBI	CHEBI:27928
ChEMBL	ChEMBL261919
ChemSpider	13844817
ECHA InfoCard	100.000.247
EC Number	200-271-7
KEGG	C06604
PubChem CID	991
RTECS number	TF4550000
UNII	61G466064D
UN number	3018 2783
CompTox Dashboard (EPA)	DTXSID7021100
- InChI: InChI=1S/C10H14NO5PS/c1-3-14-17(18,15-4-2)16-10-7-5-9(6-8-10)11(12)13/h5-8H,3-4H2,1-2H3 Key: LCCNCVORNKJIRZ-UHFFFAOYSA-N; InChI=1/C10H14NO5PS/c1-3-14-17(18,15-4-2)16-10-7-5-9(6-8-10)11(12)13/h5-8H,3-4H2,1-2H3 Key: LCCNCVORNKJIRZ-UHFFFAOYAR
- SMILES: S=P(Oc1ccc(cc1)[N+]([O-])=O)(OCC)OCC

Properties
Chemical formula	C_{10}H_{14}NO_{5}PS
Molar mass	291.26 g·mol^{−1}
Appearance	Yellow liquid
Density	1.2681 g⋅cm^{−3} (20 °C (68 °F))
Melting point	5.2–7.0 °C (41.4–44.6 °F; 278.3–280.1 K)
Boiling point	375 °C (707 °F; 648 K) Decomposes over 100 °C (212 °F)
Solubility in water	1.29 mg/100 mL (20 °C (68 °F))
Solubility	Very soluble in ethanol and ethyl acetate.; Soluble in acetone and diethyl ether.
log P	3.83
Vapor pressure	3.78×10^{−5} mmHg (5.04×10^{−3} Pa) (68 °F (20 °C))
Refractive index (n_{D})	1.537

Hazards
- GHS labelling
Pictograms	(GHS06: Toxic) (GHS08: Health hazard) (GHS09: Environmental hazard)
Signal word	Danger
Hazard statements	H300, H311, H330, H372
Precautionary statements	P260, P262, P264, P270, P271, P273, P280, P284, P301+P316, P302+P352, P304+P340, P316, P319, P320, P321, P330, P361+P364, P391, P403+P233, P405, P501
NFPA 704 (fire diamond)	4 1 2
Flash point	120 °C (248 °F; 393 K)
Threshold limit value (TLV)	0.1 mg/m^{3} (TWA)
- Lethal dose or concentration (LD, LC)
LD_{50} (median dose)	5 mg/kg (mouse, oral); 10 mg/kg (rabbit, oral); 3 mg/kg (dog, oral); 0.93 mg/kg (cat, oral); 5 mg/kg (horse, oral); 8 mg/kg (guinea pig, oral); 2 mg/kg (rat, oral)
LC_{50} (median concentration)	84 mg/m^{3} (rat, 4 hr)
LC_{Lo} (lowest published)	50 mg/m^{3} (rabbit, 2 hr); 14 mg/m^{3} (guinea pig, 2 hr); 15 mg/m^{3} (mouse)
- NIOSH (US health exposure limits)
PEL (Permissible)	TWA 0.1 mg/m^{3} [skin]
REL (Recommended)	TWA 0.05 mg/m^{3} [skin]
IDLH (Immediate danger)	10 mg/m^{3}
- Except where otherwise noted, data are given for materials in their standard state (at 25 °C [77 °F], 100 kPa). verify (what is ?) Infobox references

Parathion, also called parathion-ethyl or diethyl parathion, is an organophosphate insecticide and acaricide. It was originally developed by IG Farben in the 1940s. It is highly toxic to non-target organisms, including humans, so its use has been banned or restricted in most countries. In response to safety concerns, the less toxic but still dangerous analogue parathion methyl was later developed.

== History ==
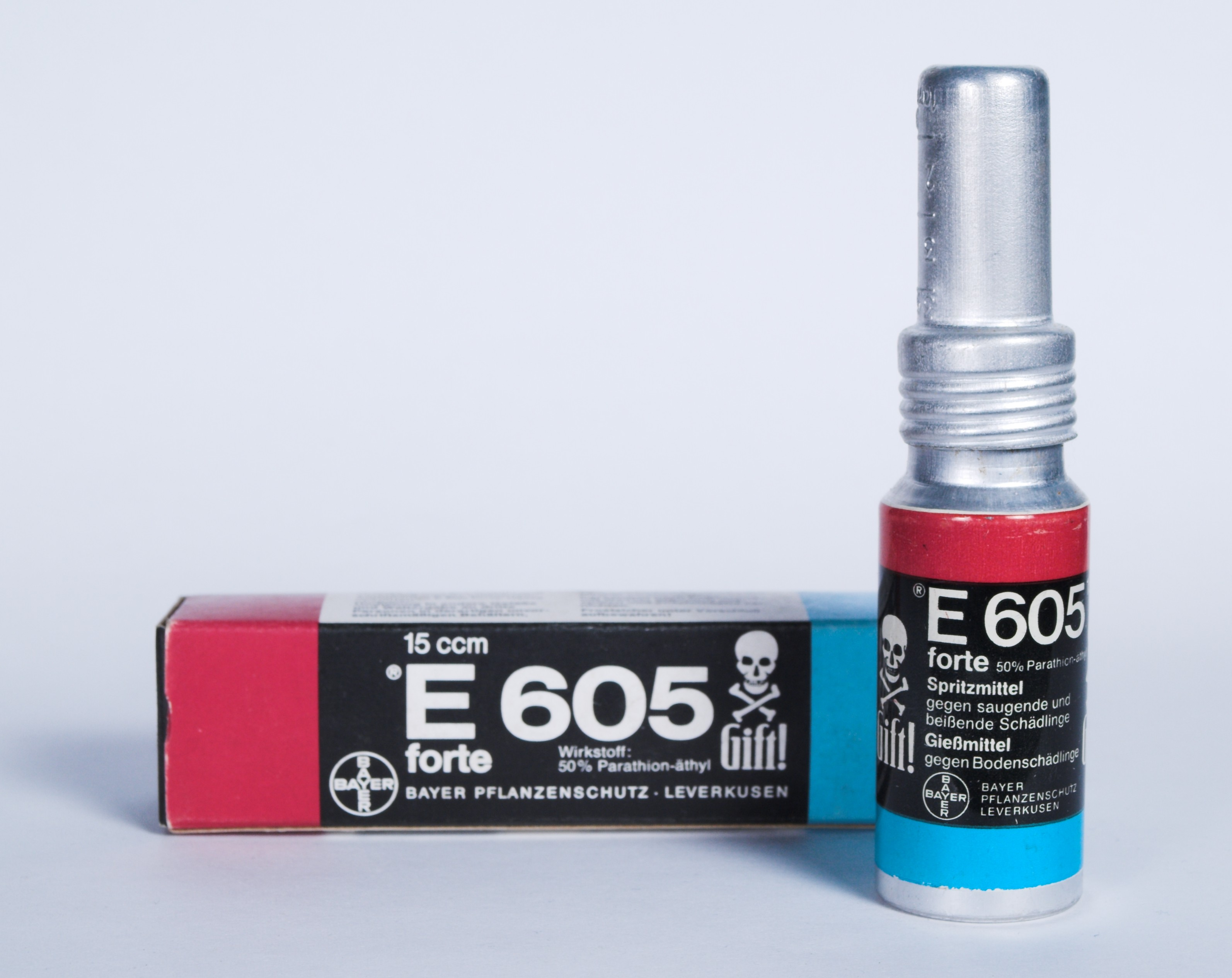
Bottle with E605

Parathion was developed by Gerhard Schrader for the German trust IG Farben in the 1940s. After World War II and the collapse of IG Farben due to the war crime trials, the Western allies seized the patent, and parathion was marketed worldwide by different companies and under different brand names. The most common German brand was E605 (banned in Germany after 2002); this was not a food-additive "E number" as used in the EU today. "E" stands for Entwicklungsnummer (German for "development number"). It is an irreversible acetylcholinesterase inhibitor.

In the EU, Parathion was banned in 2001.

== Handling properties ==
It is commonly distributed as a brown liquid that smells of rotting eggs or garlic. The insecticide is somewhat stable, although it darkens when exposed to sunlight.

== Industrial synthesis ==
Parathion is synthesized from diethyl dithiophosphoric acid (C_{2}H_{5}O)_{2}PS_{2}H by chlorination to generate diethylthiophosphoryl chloride ((C_{2}H_{5}O)_{2}P(S)Cl), and then the chloride is treated with sodium 4-nitrophenolate (the sodium salt of 4-nitrophenol).

2 (C_{2}H_{5}O)_{2}P(S)SH + 3 Cl_{2} → 2 (C_{2}H_{5}O)_{2}P(S)Cl + S_{2}Cl_{2} + 2 HCl
(C_{2}H_{5}O)_{2}P(S)Cl + NaOC_{6}H_{4}NO_{2} → (C_{2}H_{5}O)_{2}P(S)OC_{6}H_{4}NO_{2} + NaCl

== Applications ==
As a pesticide, parathion is generally applied by spraying. It is often applied to cotton, rice and fruit trees. The usual concentrations of ready-to-use solutions are 0.05 to 0.1%. The chemical is banned for use on many food crops.

== Insecticidal activity ==
Parathion acts on the enzyme acetylcholinesterase indirectly. After an insect (or a human) ingests parathion, an oxidase replaces the double bonded sulfur with oxygen to give paraoxon.

(C_{2}H_{5}O)_{2}P(S)OC_{6}H_{4}NO_{2} +1/2O_{2} → (C_{2}H_{5}O)_{2}P(O)OC_{6}H_{4}NO_{2} + S

The phosphate ester is more reactive in organisms than the phosphorothiolate ester, as the phosphorus atoms become much more electropositive.

Parathion resistance is a special case of acetylcholinesterase inhibitor resistance.

Parathion is toxic to most forms of wildlife in addition to insects if not applied at correct concentrations.

== Degradation ==
Degradation of parathion leads to more water-soluble products. Hydrolysis, which deactivates the molecule, occurs at the aryl ester bond resulting in diethyl thiophosphate and 4-nitrophenol:

(C_{2}H_{5}O)_{2}P(S)OC_{6}H_{4}NO_{2} + H_{2}O → HOC_{6}H_{4}NO_{2} + (C_{2}H_{5}O)_{2}P(O)SH

Degradation proceeds differently under anaerobic conditions: the nitro group on parathion is reduced to the amine:

(C_{2}H_{5}O)_{2}P(S)OC_{6}H_{4}NO_{2} + 6 H → (C_{2}H_{5}O)_{2}P(S)OC_{6}H_{4}NH_{2} + 2 H_{2}O

== Illicit uses ==
=== As a chemical weapon ===
Parathion was used as a chemical warfare agent, most notably by an element of the British South Africa Police attached to the Selous Scouts during the Rhodesian Bush War. They used it to poison clothing that was then supplied to anti-government guerrillas. When the enemy soldiers put on the clothes, they were poisoned by absorption through the skin.

=== Use in suicides ===
Parathion was commonly used for suicides in the 1950s and 1960s.

== Safety ==
Parathion disrupts the nervous system by inhibiting acetylcholinesterase. It is absorbed via skin, mucous membranes, and orally. Absorbed parathion is rapidly metabolized to paraoxon. Exposure can result in headaches, convulsions, poor vision, vomiting, abdominal pain, severe diarrhea, unconsciousness, tremor, dyspnea, and finally pulmonary edema as well as respiratory arrest. Symptoms of poisoning are known to last for extended periods, sometimes months. The most common and very specific antidote is atropine, in doses of up to 100 mg daily. Because atropine may also be toxic, it is recommended that small frequently repeated doses be used in treatment. If human poisoning is detected early and the treatment is prompt (atropine and artificial respiration), fatalities are infrequent. Insufficient oxygen will lead to cerebral hypoxia and permanent brain damage. Peripheral neuropathy including paralysis is noticed as late sequelae after recovery from acute intoxication.

Based on animal studies, parathion is considered by the U.S. Environmental Protection Agency to be a possible human carcinogen. Studies show that parathion is toxic to fetuses, but does not cause birth defects.

It is classified by the United Nations Environment Programme as a persistent organic pollutant and by the World Health Organization as Toxicity Class Ia (extremely hazardous).

== See also ==
- Pesticide toxicity to bees
- Parathion methyl
