= Ro 3-0422 =

Names
- Preferred IUPAC name 3-[(Diethoxyphosphoryl)oxy]-1-methylquinolin-1-ium methyl sulfate
- Other names 3-(Diethoxyphosphinyloxy)-1-methylquinolinium methylsulfate

Identifiers
CAS Number	5823-09-6
3D model (JSmol)	Interactive image
ChemSpider	174347
PubChem CID	201356
UNII	C7KH7R89YX
CompTox Dashboard (EPA)	DTXSID80206962
- InChI: InChI=1S/C14H19NO4P.CH4O4S/c1-4-17-20(16,18-5-2)19-13-10-12-8-6-7-9-14(12)15(3)11-13;1-5-6(2,3)4/h6-11H,4-5H2,1-3H3;1H3,(H,2,3,4)/q+1;/p-1 Key: YIGJQDOVGHXIJZ-UHFFFAOYSA-M
- SMILES: CCOP(=O)(OCC)Oc1cc2ccccc2[n+](c1)C.COS(=O)(=O)[O-]

Properties
Chemical formula	C_{15}H_{22}NO_{8}PS
Molar mass	407.37 g·mol^{−1}

Hazards
- Occupational safety and health (OHS/OSH)
Main hazards	Extremely toxic
- Lethal dose or concentration (LD, LC)
LD_{50} (median dose)	20 μg/kg (mice, intravenous)
- Except where otherwise noted, data are given for materials in their standard state (at 25 °C [77 °F], 100 kPa). Infobox references

Ro 3-0422 is an extremely potent organophosphate acetylcholinesterase inhibitor. It is extremely toxic. The intravenous LD_{50} is 20 μg/kg in mice. It is over 300 times more potent than neostigmine.

== See also ==
- Ro 3-0419
