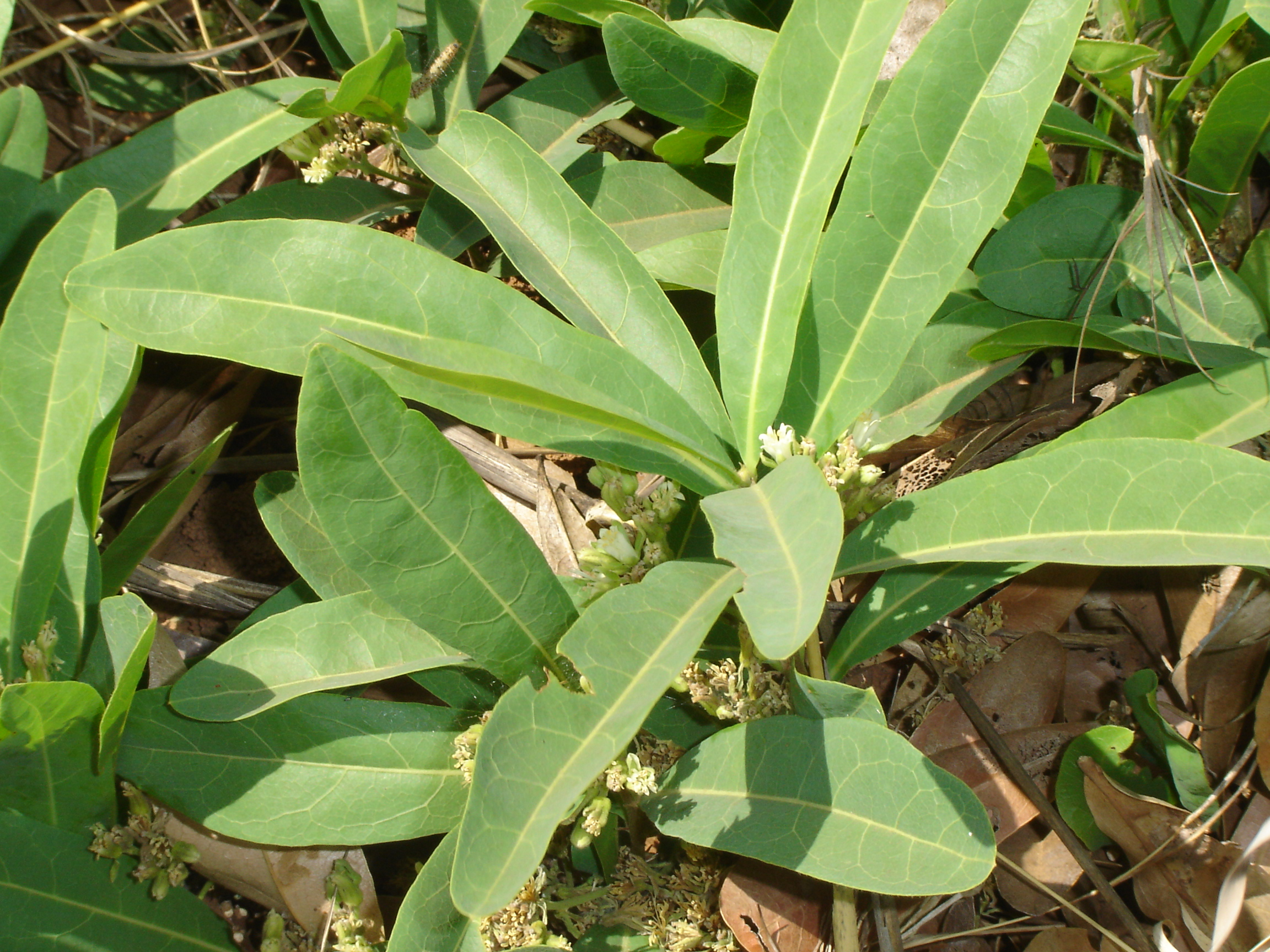

Conservation status
- Least Concern (IUCN 2.3)

Scientific classification
- Kingdom: Plantae
- Clade: Embryophytes
- Clade: Tracheophytes
- Clade: Angiosperms
- Clade: Eudicots
- Clade: Rosids
- Order: Malpighiales
- Family: Dichapetalaceae
- Genus: Dichapetalum
- Species: D. cymosum

Binomial name
- Dichapetalum cymosum (Hook.) Engl.

= Dichapetalum cymosum =

Gifblaar

Species of plant

Dichapetalum cymosum, commonly known as gifblaar in Afrikaans or occasionally by its English translation, poison leaf, is a small prostrate shrub in the family Dichapetalaceae, native to northern parts of Southern Africa. It is notable as a common cause of lethal cattle poisoning in this region and is considered one of the "big 6" most toxic plants to cattle in South Africa. A 1996 estimate of plant poisonings in South Africa attributed 8% of all cattle mortality caused by poisonous plants to gifblaar. The majority (70%) of fatal cases are in Limpopo province, with 10% each in North West, Mpumalanga, and Gauteng. The primary toxic principal is fluoroacetate, used to synthetically produce the mammal poison Compound 1080, and occurs in all parts of the plant.

Symptoms of gifblaar toxicity include vomiting, seizures, and an irregular heartbeat, and death can occur in as little as a few hours. This poison is known as "the poison that keeps on killing" because the toxin stays in the body after the animal dies, so if a predator eats the animal, the predator gets poisoned, and so on up the food chain. Even small amounts can kill small mammals such as rats, earning it the name "ratbane". Dichapetalum cymosum was first recognised as toxic by the early Voortrekkers entering the Transvaal, who were probably alerted to its lethality by natives living in the region.

== Description ==
Above ground, the plant is seen as a clump of small, woody shrubs about 15 cm (6 in) high. Such a clump is typically a single plant, as gifblaar has a huge underground root system – likened to an underground tree – and sends multiple shoots above ground in favourable conditions. The most obvious aboveground parts are the leaves – simple, alternate, with initially fine hairs later becoming glabrous. The leaves are bright green in colour on both sides. The secondary veins form loops and do not reach the margin. The flowers are small and white, and occur in dense clusters in the early spring. Fruit formation is rare; the fruits are orange and leathery, are not poisonous and known to be consumed by the San people.

Identification of gifblaar in the field is important in prevention of toxicity and also in assigning gifblaar as the cause of toxicity during an outbreak. It is a small, low-growing, nondescript shrub and thus easily confused with other species. There are four plants in its habitat with which it is principally confused: Ochna pulchra (lekkerbreek) saplings, Parinari capensis (grysappel), Pygmaeothamnus spp. (goorappels) and the various gousiektebossies (various genera and species of the family Rubiaceae, such as Vangueria). The first three of these are non-toxic, but gousiektebossies are also toxic and another of the "big 6" cattle poisons.

Gousiektebossies and goorappel can be distinguished from D. cymosum because they have opposite, not alternate, leaves. Goorappel leaves also have a characteristic bulge terminally, though only when mature. Grysappel and Ochna pulchra have alternate leaves, but grysappel has pale grey undersides to its leaves (its name means "grey apple"). O. pulchra leaves have secondary veins that extend all the way to the margin and are not looped, and the margin itself is dentate, not smooth.

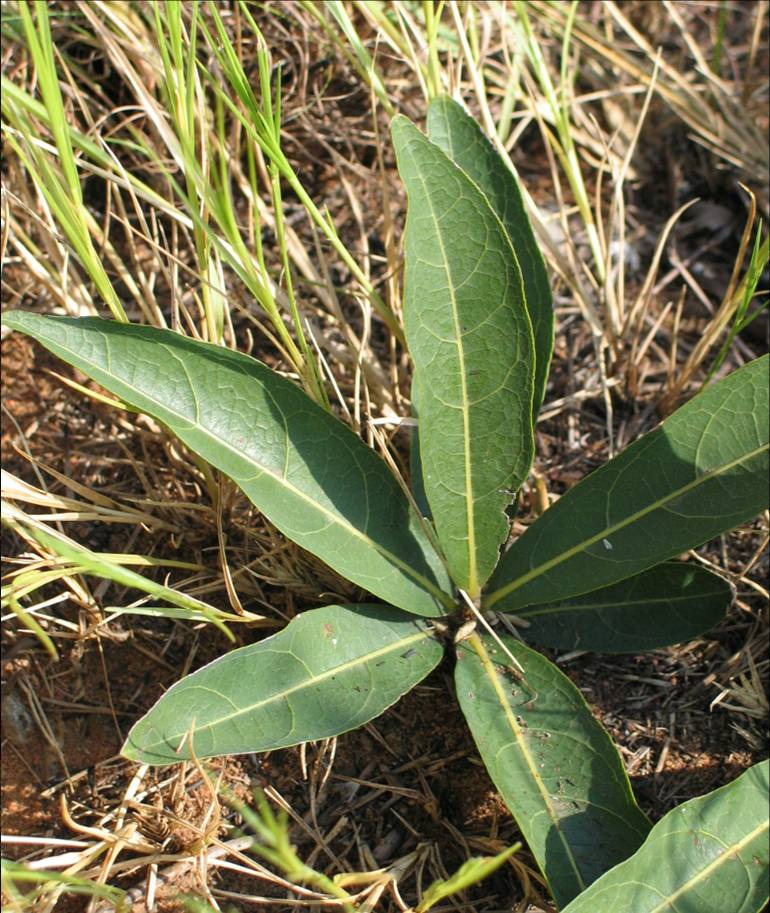
Leaves

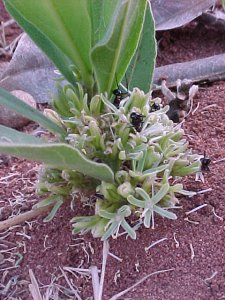
In flower

== Distribution and habitat ==
Gifblaar occurs in dry, sandy areas in acidic soils, as well as the northern slopes of rocky hills in the southern parts of the African savannah biome. In South Africa, the distribution is within the so-called "gifblaar triangle", the points of which are Mmabatho; Middelburg, Mpumalanga; and Musina. The traditional southern border of gifblaar's distribution is the Magaliesberg mountains. It also occurs in an isolated region in the far north of KwaZulu-Natal. Gifblaar is also found in Namibia, Zimbabwe, Botswana and southern Angola. It is typically accompanied in its habitat by other characteristic flora which can be used as indicator species to identify veld which potentially harbours gifblaar; this veld is called "gifveld" by farmers of the region. These accompanying species include Burkea africana, Terminalia sericea, and Ochna pulchra, and also the shrub Parinari capensis. The latter two species are commonly mistaken for gifblaar.

== Toxicity and biochemistry ==
Sodium fluoroacetate is one of the few naturally occurring fluorine compounds and is present in D. cymosum.

The toxic compound isolated as the cause of gifblaar poisoning is fluoroacetate, which was first isolated by Marais in 1944. The LD_{50} of this compound is 0.5 mg/kg, which means that about 200 grams of dry plant material is sufficient to kill a 500 kg cow. The compound itself is not toxic but undergoes lethal synthesis in the body while reacting with coenzyme A, yielding fluoroacetyl-Coenzyme A. This compound then reacts with oxaloacetate to form fluorocitrate, which is toxic, being a competitive substrate for aconitase (whose normal substrate is citrate). It binds irreversibly to the aconitase but cannot be released, disrupting the Krebs cycle and thus severely inhibiting cellular respiration. Furthermore, fluorocitrate, unlike citrate, cannot cross from the cytoplasm into the mitochondria, where citrate is needed. It is instead degraded in the cytoplasm.

Dichapetalum cymosum itself is resistant to the toxic effects since it contains high levels of the enzyme fluoroacetyl-CoA thioesterase which hydrolyses any fluoroacetyl-Coenzyme A produced back to fluoroacetic acid and Coenzyme A.

== Pathology ==
In cattle, death by acute cardiac arrest is seen following drinking or some kind of exertion. Affected animals will show dyspnoea and arrhythmias before this. There may occasionally be neurological signs such as trembling, twitching and convulsions. Death occurs 4 to 24 hours after ingestion. In rare cases, an animal will survive the initial period only to drop dead months later of heart failure - so-called chronic gifblaar poisoning. On post-mortem, leaves may be found in the rumen, cyanosis may be seen, as well as signs of heart failure - congestion, haemorrhage, and myocardial necrosis (on histopathology). Diagnosis is based on these as well as the presence of gifblaar in the camp, particularly if signs of consumption are seen. Tests can be done for monofluoroacetate in rumen fluid, kidneys and liver.

== Treatment ==
There are no confirmed therapeutic measures that have been developed for the prevention or treatment of gifblaar poisoning. Treatment often consists of helping animals to remain calm and rested. Animals are usually removed from the infected camp, but without exciting them. It is thought that withholding water for 48 hours can improve prognosis. Removing all known plants from pastures may reduce risk of exposure.

== Pattern of toxicity ==
Cattle are mostly affected, with sheep, goats and game rarely being poisoned. The compound is equally poisonous to these species; an explanation is that the bulk grazing style of cattle, which is by nature less selective, lends itself to the ingestion of the plant. Young sprouts have more monofluoroacetate, but all parts are lethal. The plant sprouts in late winter, before the spring rains, the cue for most plants - including grasses - to shoot. This makes it the predominant greenery during that period. Cases of poisoning are most frequent at this time. Later in the season, gifblaar poisoning is far less common; presumably enough other grazing occurs that gifblaar is not eaten. Autumn (late season) poisonings also occur. This is associated with heavy grazing, leading to denudation of preferred species, and gifblaar is again the predominant herbage within the camp. Poisoning of carnivores, including dogs, has been reported after consumption of ruminal contents of poisoned animals.

== Management ==
Mechanical methods of removal have proven to be ineffective because of the plant's extensive root system. From the above it is clear that gifblaar-infested camps are not ungrazeable per se. Nevertheless, caution should be taken and animals should only be grazed later in the season, and the camps should not be overutilised.
