= Rudolph Peters =

British biochemist (1889–1982)

Sir Rudolph Peters
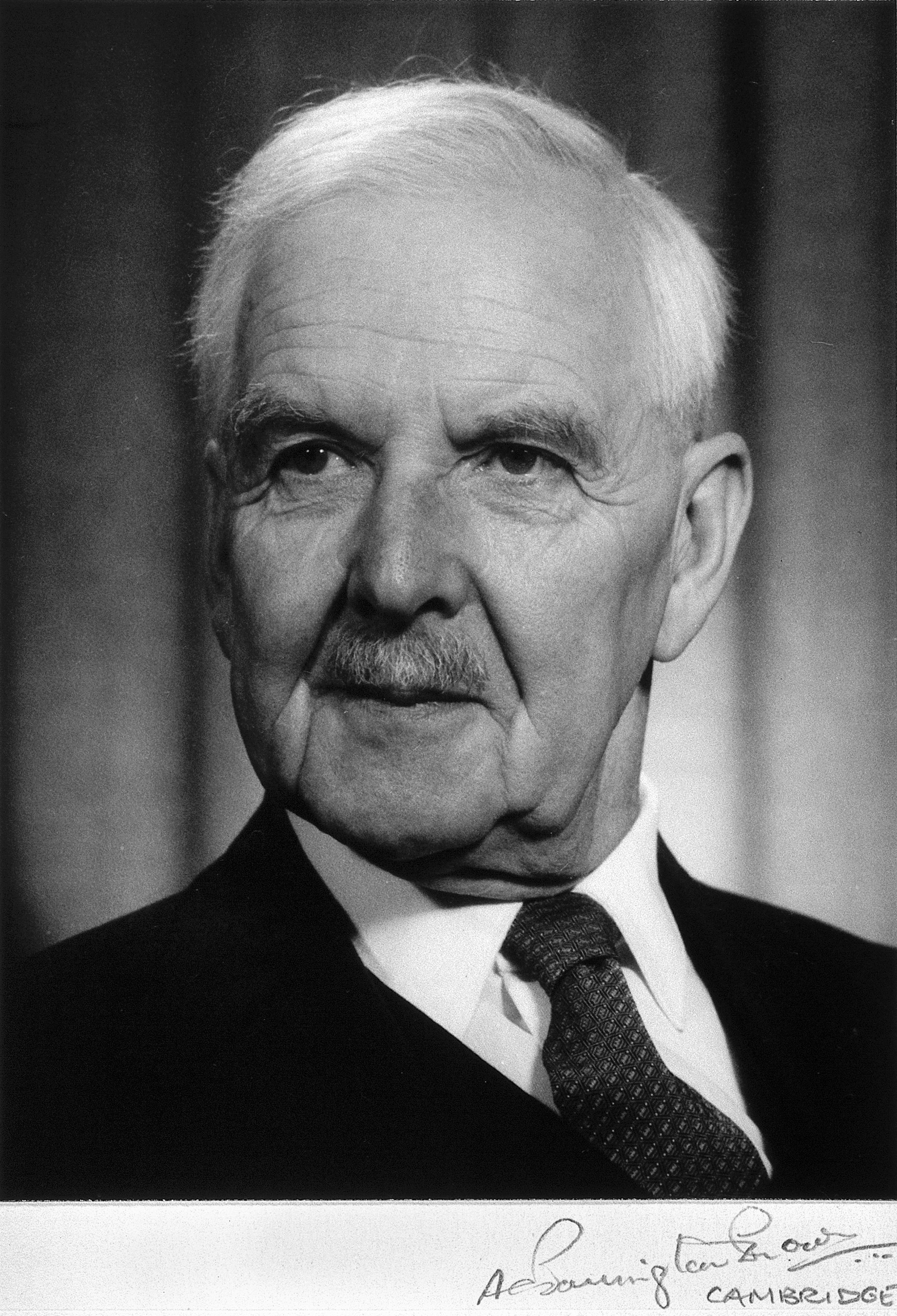
- Born: 13 April 1889; Kensington
- Died: 29 January 1982 (aged 92); Cambridge
- Spouse: Frances Williamina Vérel
- Awards: FRS (1935); Royal Medal (1949); Cameron Prize for Therapeutics of the University of Edinburgh (1950)

Sir Rudolph Albert Peters MC MID FRS HFRSE FRCP LLD (13 April 1889 – 29 January 1982) was a British biochemist. He led the research team at Oxford who developed British Anti-Lewisite (BAL), an antidote for the chemical warfare agent lewisite. His efforts investigating the mechanism of arsenic war gases were deemed crucial in maintaining battlefield effectiveness.

== Life ==
He was born in Kensington in London the son of Dr Albert E. D. R. Peters (1863–1945), a physician, and his wife, Agnes Malvina Watts (1867–1950).

He was educated at Wellington College, Berkshire, then studied medicine at King's College London and Gonville and Caius College, Cambridge.

In the First World War he served in the Royal Army Medical Corps as Medical Officer to the 60th Rifles. From 1917 he was attached to the chemical warfare section at Porton Down. After the war he returned to Cambridge University lecturing in biochemistry. In 1923 he was created professor of biochemistry at Oxford University.

After the Second World War, he researched pyruvate metabolism, focussing particularly on the toxicity of fluoroacetate. The fact that fluoroacetate in itself is far less toxic than its metabolite fluorocitrate led him to coin the term "lethal synthesis" which was the title of his Croonian Lecture of 1951.

Peters retired from academia in 1954 to establish, at age 65, a new department of biochemistry at the Agricultural Research Council Animal Physiology Unit at Babraham; he retired five years later.

He was elected FRS in 1935. In 1940, he received the Cameron Prize for Therapeutics of the University of Edinburgh. He was knighted by Queen Elizabeth II in 1952 and elected an Honorary Fellow of the Royal Society of Edinburgh in 1957.

He died in Cambridge on 29 January 1982, and was cremated there on 4 February.

Some of Sir Rudolph's papers are held at the Bodleian Library.

== Family ==
Peters married Frances Williamina Vérel at the Queen's Park Free Church, Glasgow, on 7 November 1917. Frances was the daughter of Francis William Vérel, a photographic chemist, and had been at school in Westgate-on-Sea with Peters's sister, Gwendoline. They had two sons: Rudolph V (1918–2013), and Francis Raymond (1922–2023).
