= Fluoroacetyl-CoA thioesterase =

Class of enzymes

Identifiers
- EC no.: 3.1.2.29

Databases
- BRENDA: enzyme data
- ExPASy: NiceZyme view
- KEGG: enzyme entry
- MetaCyc: metabolic pathway
- Rhea: reactions
- PDB structures: RCSB PDB PDBe PDBsum
Search
- PMC: articles
- PubMed: articles
- NCBI: proteins

The enzyme fluoroacetyl-CoA thioesterase (EC 3.1.2.29; systematic name fluoroacetyl-CoA hydrolase) catalyses the following reaction:

fluoroacetyl-CoA
H_{2}O
coenzyme A
+
fluoroacetic acid

The enzyme characterised from the plant Dichapetalum cymosum and the bacterium Streptomyces cattleya hydrolyses fluoroacetyl-CoA to coenzyme A and fluoroacetic acid, which form the thioester in the starting material.

Dichapetalum cymosum is native to northern parts of Southern Africa and is a common cause of lethal cattle poisoning owing to the content of fluoroacetic acid in its leaves. Fluoroacetate is extremely toxic to most organisms. The enzyme ensures that any fluoroacetyl-CoA produced by normal metabolic processes that use acetyl-CoA cannot go on to be incorporated into fluorocitric acid by citrate synthase.
