= Bebearia guineensis =

Scientific classification
- Kingdom: Animalia
- Phylum: Arthropoda
- Class: Insecta
- Order: Lepidoptera
- Family: Nymphalidae
- Genus: Bebearia
- Species: B. guineensis

Binomial name
- Bebearia guineensis (Felder & Felder, 1867)

Synonyms
- Euryphene guineensis Felder & Felder, 1867; Bebearia (Apectinaria) guineensis; Bebearia cocalia guineensis

Species of butterfly

Bebearia guineensis, the wide-banded palm forester, is a butterfly in the family Nymphalidae. It is found in Nigeria, Cameroon, the Republic of the Congo, the western part of the Democratic Republic of the Congo and northern Angola. The habitat consists of primary, undisturbed forests.

Originally described as Euryphene guineensis C. & R. Felder, [1867] it has been variously placed

- Bebearia cocalia guineensis (Hecq, 2000, Butterflies of the world)
- Bebearia guineensis (Hancock, 1992, J. Lep. Soc)
- Bebearia senegalensis guineensis(Lepindex)

Its status remains uncertain.
