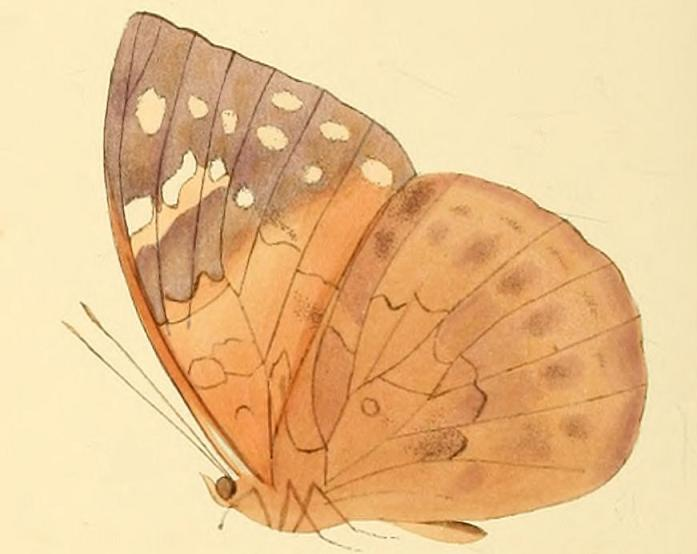

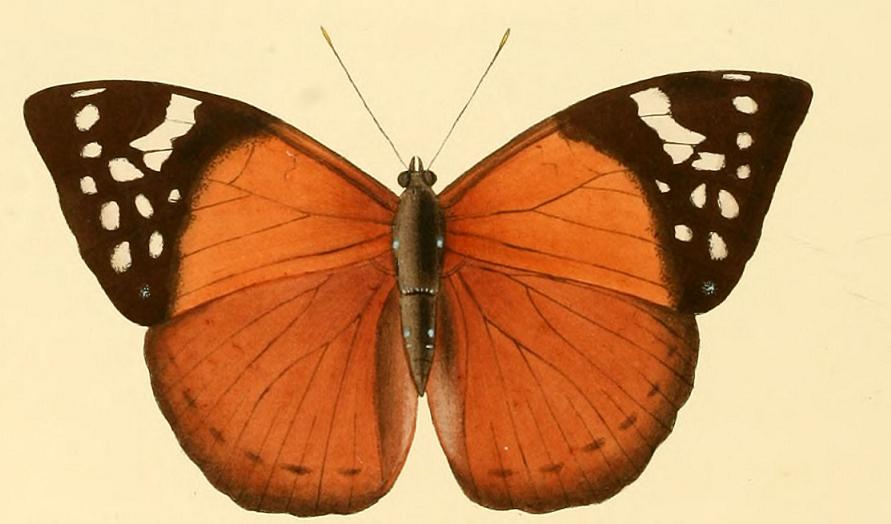

Scientific classification
- Kingdom: Animalia
- Phylum: Arthropoda
- Class: Insecta
- Order: Lepidoptera
- Family: Nymphalidae
- Genus: Bebearia
- Species: B. plistonax

Binomial name
- Bebearia plistonax (Hewitson, 1874)

Synonyms
- Euryphene plistonax Hewitson, 1874; Bebearia (Apectinaria) plistonax; Euryphene plistonax var. flavitaenia Gaede, 1916

= Bebearia plistonax =

Species of butterfly

Bebearia plistonax, the plistonax forester, is a butterfly in the family Nymphalidae. It is found in Nigeria, Cameroon, Gabon, the Republic of the Congo, the Central African Republic, Angola, the Democratic Republic of the Congo (Ubangi, Mongala, Uele, northern Kivu, Tshopo, Tshuapa, Equateur, Kasai, Sankuru and Lualaba), Uganda, north-western Tanzania and northern Zambia. The habitat consists of forests.

The hindwing and the basal part of the forewing are yellow-brown, the apical part of the forewing black with narrow white subapical band, which is occasionally yellowish in the male and two transverse rows of white spots; the brown basal part is without markings or has some fine dark transverse streaks; the hindwing has a strongly undulate submarginal line and is more or less broadly darkened at the distal margin; the under surface is grey-brown, somewhat darker at the base, the markings indistinct; the subapical band of the forewing is represented by 3 or 4 free, almost silvery spots. The species strongly recalls mardania female above. Lagos to Angola.

Adults are attracted to fallen fruit.

The larvae feed on Ochna pulchra.
