= Aconitate hydratase, mitochondrial =

Enzyme found in humans

ACO2

Identifiers
- Aliases: ACO2, ACONM, ICRD, OCA8, HEL-S-284, OPA9, aconitase 2
- External IDs: OMIM: 100850; MGI: 87880; GeneCards: ACO2
Enzyme activity
EC #	BRENDA	ExPASy	KEGG	MetaCyc
4.2.1.3	↗	↗	↗	↗

Gene location (Human)
Chr.	Chromosome 22 (human)
Band	22q13.2	Start	41,447,830 bp
Band	22q13.2	End	41,529,273 bp

Gene location (Mouse)
Chr.	Chromosome 15 (mouse)
Band	15|15 E1	Start	81,756,510 bp
Band	15|15 E1	End	81,799,334 bp
RNA expression pattern
Bgee	Human / Mouse (ortholog); Top expressed in: right ventricle; apex of heart; myocardium of left ventricle; gastrocnemius muscle; muscle of thigh; right auricle of heart; jejunal mucosa; cardiac muscle tissue of right atrium; Skeletal muscle tissue of biceps brachii; vastus lateralis muscle / Top expressed in: cardiac muscle tissue of left ventricle; right ventricle; extensor digitorum longus muscle; plantaris muscle; soleus muscle; extraocular muscle; digastric muscle; gastrocnemius muscle; interventricular septum; tibialis anterior muscle; More reference expression data
BioGPS	n/a
Gene ontology
Molecular function	iron ion binding; 4 iron, 4 sulfur cluster binding; iron-sulfur cluster binding; 3 iron, 4 sulfur cluster binding; metal ion binding; lyase activity; aconitate hydratase activity
Cellular component	myelin sheath; mitochondrial matrix; mitochondrion; cytosol
Biological process	citrate metabolic process; metabolism; tricarboxylic acid cycle; generation of precursor metabolites and energy; isocitrate metabolic process; liver development; response to isolation stress
Sources:Amigo / QuickGO
Orthologs
Databases	NCBI: entry; OMA: entry
Species	Human	Mouse
Entrez	50	11429
Ensembl	ENSG00000100412	ENSMUSG00000022477
UniProt	Q99798	Q99KI0
RefSeq (mRNA)	NM_001098	NM_080633
RefSeq (protein)	NP_001089	NP_542364
Location (UCSC)	Chr 22: 41.45 – 41.53 Mb	Chr 15: 81.76 – 81.8 Mb
PubMed search
- Wikidata
View/Edit Human	View/Edit Mouse

Aconitate hydratase, mitochondrial, also called Aconitase 2, is a enzyme that in humans is encoded by the ACO2 gene. This form of aconitase is located in the mitochondria and plays a vital role in metabolism by performing a step in the citric acid cycle.

== Structure ==
The secondary structure of ACO2 consists of numerous alternating alpha helices and beta sheets (SCOP classification: α/β alternating). The tertiary structure reveals that the active site is buried in the middle of the enzyme, and, since there is only one subunit, there is no quaternary structure. Aconitase consists of four domains: three of the domains are tightly compact, and the fourth domain is more flexible, allowing for conformational changes. The ACO2 protein contains a 4Fe-4S iron-sulfur cluster. This iron sulfur cluster does not have the typical function of participating in oxidation-reduction reactions, but rather facilitates the elimination of the citrate hydroxyl group by holding the group in a certain conformation and orientation. It is at this 4Fe-4S site that citrate or isocitrate binds to initiate catalysis. The rest of the active site is made up of the following residues: Gln72, Asp100, His101, Asp165, Ser166, His167, His147, Glu262, Asn258, Cys358, Cys421, Cys424, Cys358, Cys421, Asn446, Arg447, Arg452, Asp568, Ser642, Ser643, Arg644, Arg580. Their functions have yet to be elucidated.

== Function ==
The protein encoded by this gene belongs to the aconitase/IPM isomerase family. It is an enzyme that catalyzes the interconversion of citrate to isocitrate via cis-aconitate in the second step of the TCA cycle. This protein is encoded in the nucleus and functions in the mitochondrion. It was found to be one of the mitochondrial matrix proteins that are preferentially degraded by the serine protease 15 (PRSS15), also known as Lon protease, after oxidative modification.

=== Mechanism ===
While both forms of aconitases have similar functions, most studies focus on ACO2. The iron-sulfur (4Fe-4S) cofactor is held in place by the sulfur atoms on Cys385, Cys448, and Cys451, which are bind to three of the four available iron atoms. A fourth iron atom is included in the cluster together with a water molecule when the enzyme is activated. This fourth iron atom binds to either one, two, or three partners; in this reaction, oxygen atoms belonging to outside metabolites are always involved. When ACO2 is not bound to a substrate, the iron-sulfur cluster is bound to a hydroxyl group through an interaction with one of the iron molecules. When the substrate binds, the bound hydroxyl becomes protonated. A hydrogen bond forms between His101 and the protonated hydroxyl, which allows the hydroxyl to form a water molecule. Alternatively, the proton could be donated by His167 as this histidine is hydrogen bonded to a H_{2}O molecule. His167 is also hydrogen bonded to the bound H_{2}O in the cluster. Both His101 and His167 are paired with carboxylates Asp100 and Glu262, respectively, and are likely to be protonated. The conformational change associated with substrate binding reorients the cluster. The residue that removes a proton from citrate or isocitrate is Ser642. This causes the cis-Aconitate intermediate, which is a direct result of the deprotonation. Then, there is a rehydration of the double bond of cis-aconitate to form the product.

== Clinical significance ==
Pathogenic mutations in ACO2 have been associated with a disorder causing deteriorating vision in childhood, called optic atrophy-9 (OPA9), in some cases inherited in an autosomal dominant manner. Other mutations have been associated with broader brain and muscle dysfunction starting at 2-6 months, and called infantile cerebellar-retinal degeneration (ICRD).

A number of other illnesses are related to this enzyme but not caused by mutations in ACO2, such as a serious ailment known as aconitase deficiency. It is caused by a mutation in the gene for iron-sulfur cluster scaffold protein (ISCU), which helps build the Fe-S cluster on which the activity of aconitase depends. The main symptoms are myopathy and exercise intolerance; physical strain is lethal for some patients because it can lead to circulatory shock. There are no known treatments for aconitase deficiency.

Another disease associated with aconitase is Friedreich's ataxia (FRDA), which is caused when the Fe-S proteins in aconitase and succinate dehydrogenase have decreased activity. A proposed mechanism for this connection is that decreased Fe-S activity in aconitase and succinate dehydrogenase is correlated with excess iron concentration in the mitochondria and insufficient iron in the cytoplasm, disrupting iron homeostasis. This deviance from homeostasis causes FRDA, a neurodegenerative disease for which no effective treatments have been found.

Finally, aconitase is thought to be associated with diabetes. Although the exact connection is still being determined, multiple theories exist. In a study of organs from mice with alloxan diabetes (experimentally induced diabetes) and genetic diabetes, lower aconitase activity was found to decrease the rates of metabolic reactions involving citrate, pyruvate, and malate. In addition, citrate concentration was observed to be unusually high. Since these abnormal data were found in diabetic mice, the study concluded that low aconitase activity is likely correlated with genetic and alloxan diabetes. Another theory is that, in diabetic hearts, accelerated phosphorylation of heart aconitase by protein kinase C causes aconitase to speed up the final step of its reverse reaction relative to its forward reaction. That is, it converts isocitrate back to cis-aconitate more rapidly than usual, but the forward reaction proceeds at the usual rate. This imbalance may contribute to disrupted metabolism in diabetics.

The mitochondrial form of aconitase, ACO2, is correlated with many diseases, as it is directly involved in the conversion of glucose into ATP, or the central metabolic pathway. Decreased expression of ACO2 in gastric cancer cells has been associated with a poor prognosis; this effect has also been seen in prostate cancer cells. A few treatments have been identified in vitro to induce greater ACO2 expression, including exposing the cells to hypoxia and the element manganese.
