= Ratbane =

Ratbane, or Rat's bane, may refer to one of the following:

- Arsenic trioxide, a poisonous substance
- Common wintergreen, Pyrola minor, also known as Rat's vein
- False hellebore, Veratrum viride
- Gifblaar, Dichapetalum cymosum
- Helleborine, Epipactis pubescens
- Pipsissewa plant, Chimaphila umbellata
