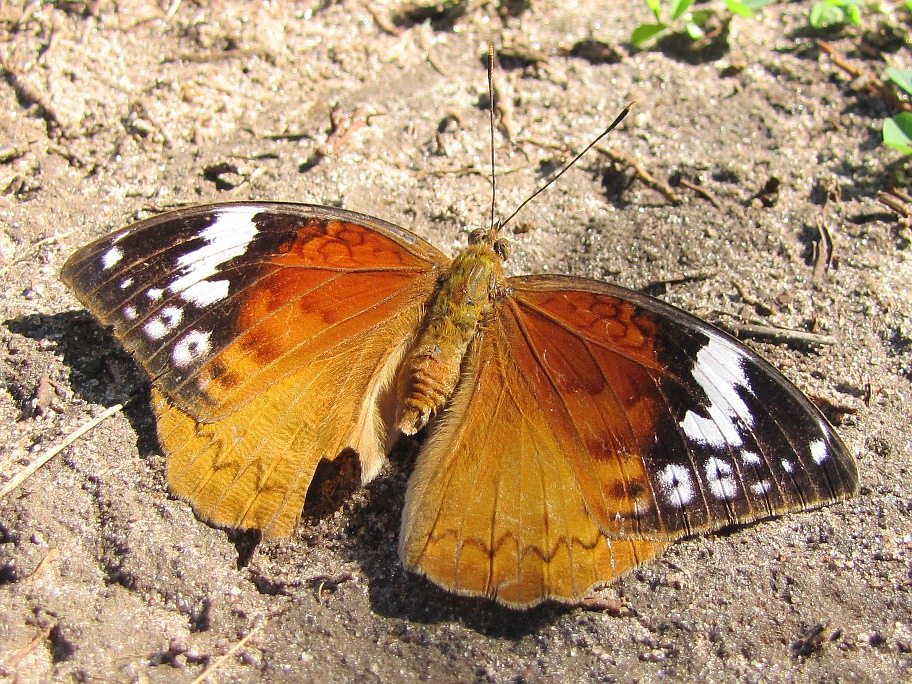
- Female
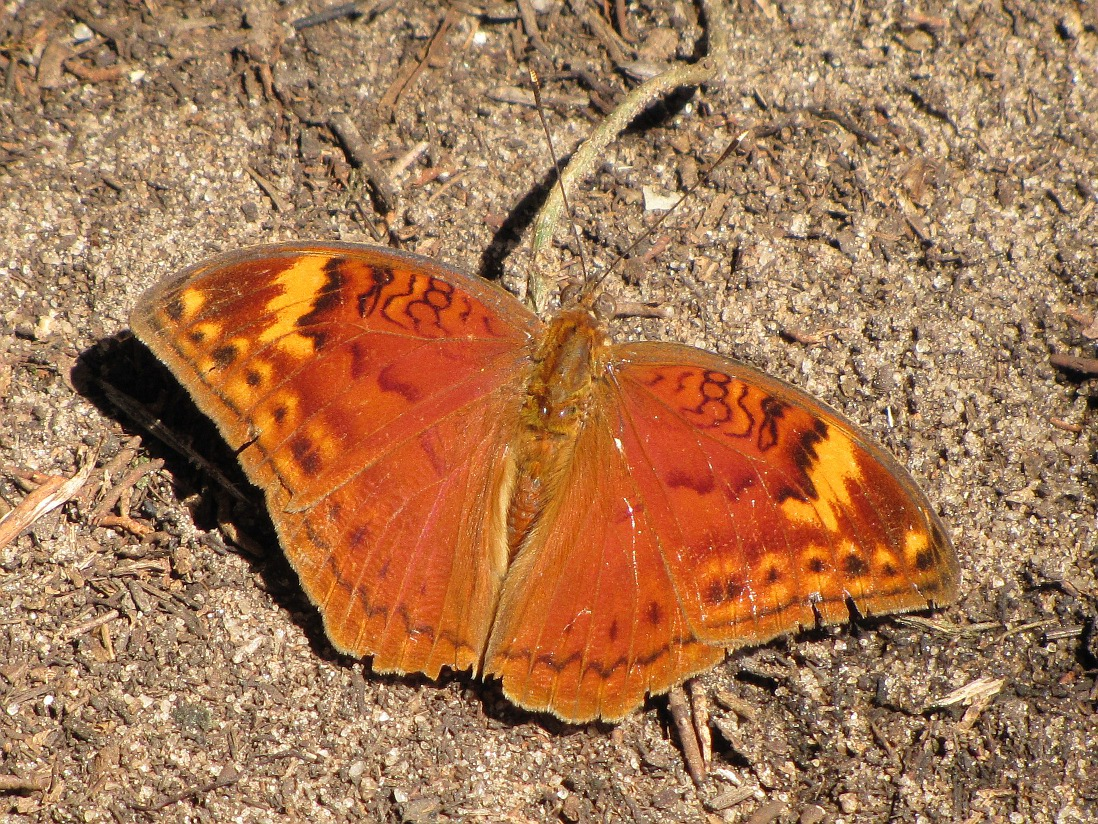
- Male

Scientific classification
- Kingdom: Animalia
- Phylum: Arthropoda
- Clade: Pancrustacea
- Class: Insecta
- Order: Lepidoptera
- Family: Nymphalidae
- Genus: Bebearia
- Species: B. cocalia

Binomial name
- Bebearia cocalia (Fabricius, 1793)

Synonyms
- Papilio cocalia Fabricius, 1793; Bebearia (Apectinaria) cocalia; Euryphene badiana Rebel, 1914; Bebearia badiana; Euphaedra themis ab. inornata Rebel, 1914; Euryphene mardania katera van Someren, 1939; Bebearia senegalensis katera; Euryphene mardania f. insularis Schultze, 1920

= Bebearia cocalia =

Common palm forester

Species of butterfly

Bebearia cocalia, the common palm forester, is a butterfly in the family Nymphalidae. It is found in Guinea, Guinea-Bissau, Sierra Leone, Liberia, Ivory Coast, Ghana, Togo, Nigeria, Cameroon, Gabon, the Republic of the Congo, Angola, the Democratic Republic of the Congo, Uganda, Kenya, Tanzania and Zambia. The habitat consists of forests, particularly riparian forests

Both sexes are distinguished by the long and sharp teeth of the second transverse line of the forewing on veins -4 and 5. In the male the wings are dark red-brown or chestnut-brown above, with distinct black markings, only the third transverse band is scarcely darker than the ground-colour and hence only shows up at the costal margin of the forewing where it is light-bordered; the yellow subapical band of the forewing is very narrow (about 1 mm. in breadth) and is only present as a yellow bordering to the distal side of the second band in cellules 3—6; the postdiscal spots are large and rounded and at least on the forewing margined with orange. The female differs from the other species in the light upper surface; the basal part is light brown-yellow and distally shades gradually into the whitish ground-colour of the distal half; the dark markings as in the male; both wings darkened at the distal margin. Cameroons to Congo.

Adults are attracted to fermented bananas.

The larvae feed on palm trees.

== Subspecies ==
- B. c. cocalia (south-western Guinea, Guinea-Bissau, Sierra Leone, Liberia, Ivory Coast, Ghana)
- B. c. badiana (Rebel, 1914) (Democratic Republic of the Congo: Kivu, western Uganda, north-western Tanzania, western and central Kenya)
- B. c. continentalis Hecq, 1988 (Ghana: the Volta region, Togo, western Nigeria)
- B. c. katera (van Someren, 1939) (eastern Nigeria, Cameroon, Gabon, Congo, northern Angola, Democratic Republic of the Congo, western Uganda, western Tanzania, western Zambia)

Torben Larsen developed a species numbering system for his 2005 publication Butterflies of West Africa. The nominate subspecies is #1011. The 'Larsen' numbers have since been used with permission in A Sharp Eye on Butterflies of Ghana.

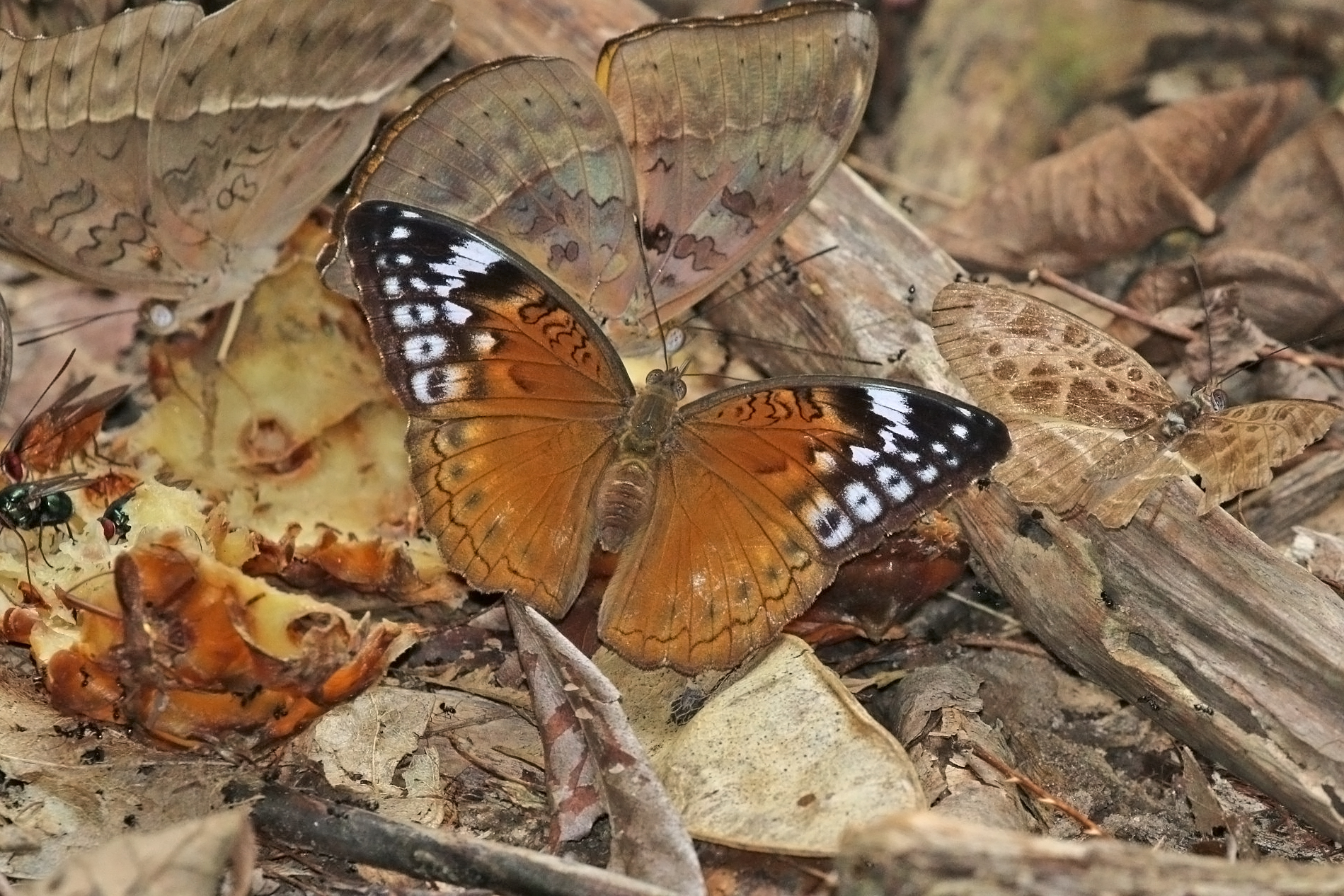
Female B. c. cocalia
Kakum National Park, Ghana

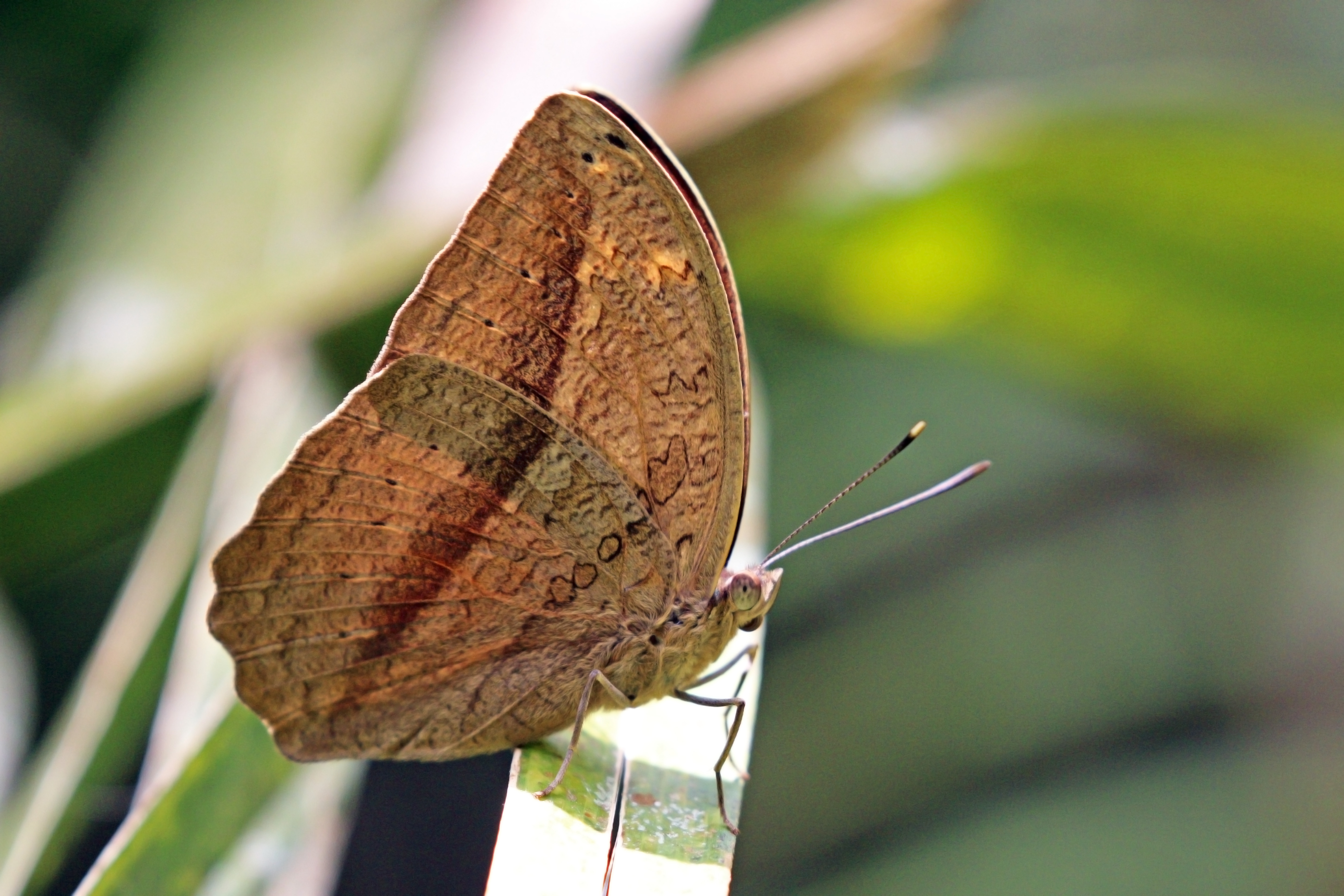
Male B. c. katera
Kibale Forest, Uganda

== Taxonomy ==
It is a part of the Bebearia mardania species complex
