= Lethal synthesis =

Synthesis of toxic substances from a non-toxic precursor

Lethal synthesis, or suicide metabolism, is the biosynthesis of a toxin from a precursor which is not itself toxic, such as the synthesis of fluorocitrate from fluoroacetate or the synthesis of methylglyoxal from glycerol.

The term was first publicised by Rudolph Peters in his Croonian Lecture of 1951.

== Lethal synthesis of methylglyoxal ==
A 1971 study published by the Harvard Medical School identified methylglyoxal, a form of glycerol, as a product of lethal synthesis in a specific E.coli mutant. In E.coli, the synthesis of triose phosphate from glycerol is a reaction regulated by the synthesis rate of glycerol kinase and by feedback inhibition by fructose-1,6-bisphosphate. The study demonstrated that, in E.coli mutants that had lost both control mechanisms, glycerol kinase no longer reacted to feedback regulation and instead produced the cytotoxic methylglyoxal. A more recent review of research done on methylglyoxal metabolism concluded that the compound's cytotoxic nature is dependent on its ability to form advanced glycation end products (AGEs). These compounds, which are thought to be factors in ageing and in the progression of degenerative diseases, have been shown to hinder the functions of the proteins they target.
