= Chlorocitric acid =

Names
- IUPAC name 1-chloro-2-hydroxypropane-1,2,3-tricarboxylic acid
- Other names Chlorocitrate, (−)-threo-chlorocitric acid

Identifiers
3D model (JSmol)	Interactive image
ChemSpider	9710713
PubChem CID	11535932
UNII	0W1BY8O77G
- InChI: InChI=1S/C6H7ClO7/c7-3(4(10)11)6(14,5(12)13)1-2(8)9/h3,14H,1H2,(H,8,9)(H,10,11)(H,12,13) Key: PLYZXLXZNMQAAU-UHFFFAOYSA-N
- SMILES: OC(=O)CC(O)(C(Cl)C(O)=O)C(O)=O

Properties
Chemical formula	C_{6}H_{7}ClO_{7}
Molar mass	226.57 g·mol^{−1}
Solubility in water	soluble
- Except where otherwise noted, data are given for materials in their standard state (at 25 °C [77 °F], 100 kPa). Infobox references

Chlorocitric acid is a organochlorine compound, a derivative of citric acid, belonging to the group of tricarboxylic acids and their derivatives, characterized by the presence of three carboxyl groups. Its chemical formula is C_{6}H_{7}ClO_{7}.

== Natural occurrence ==
The acid has been detected in human blood. Chlorocitric acid is not a naturally occurring metabolite; it is found exclusively in individuals who have been exposed to this compound or its derivatives. From a scientific perspective, chlorocitric acid is considered to be part of the human exposome, which encompasses all exposures that individuals encounter throughout their lifetime and their impact on health. These exposures begin before birth and include environmental and occupational factors.

== Synthesis ==
Chlorocitric acid is obtained by the action of hypochlorous acid on aconitic acid in aqueus solution.

== Physical properties ==
The acid is uncrystallizible, soluble in water and ether. The compound decomposes when heated, releasing hydrochloric acid and oxycitric acid.

== Uses ==
There are reports suggesting that chlorocitric acid might be used as an anti-obesity agent.

== See also ==
- Fluorocitric acid
- Hydroxycitric acid
- Isocitric acid
