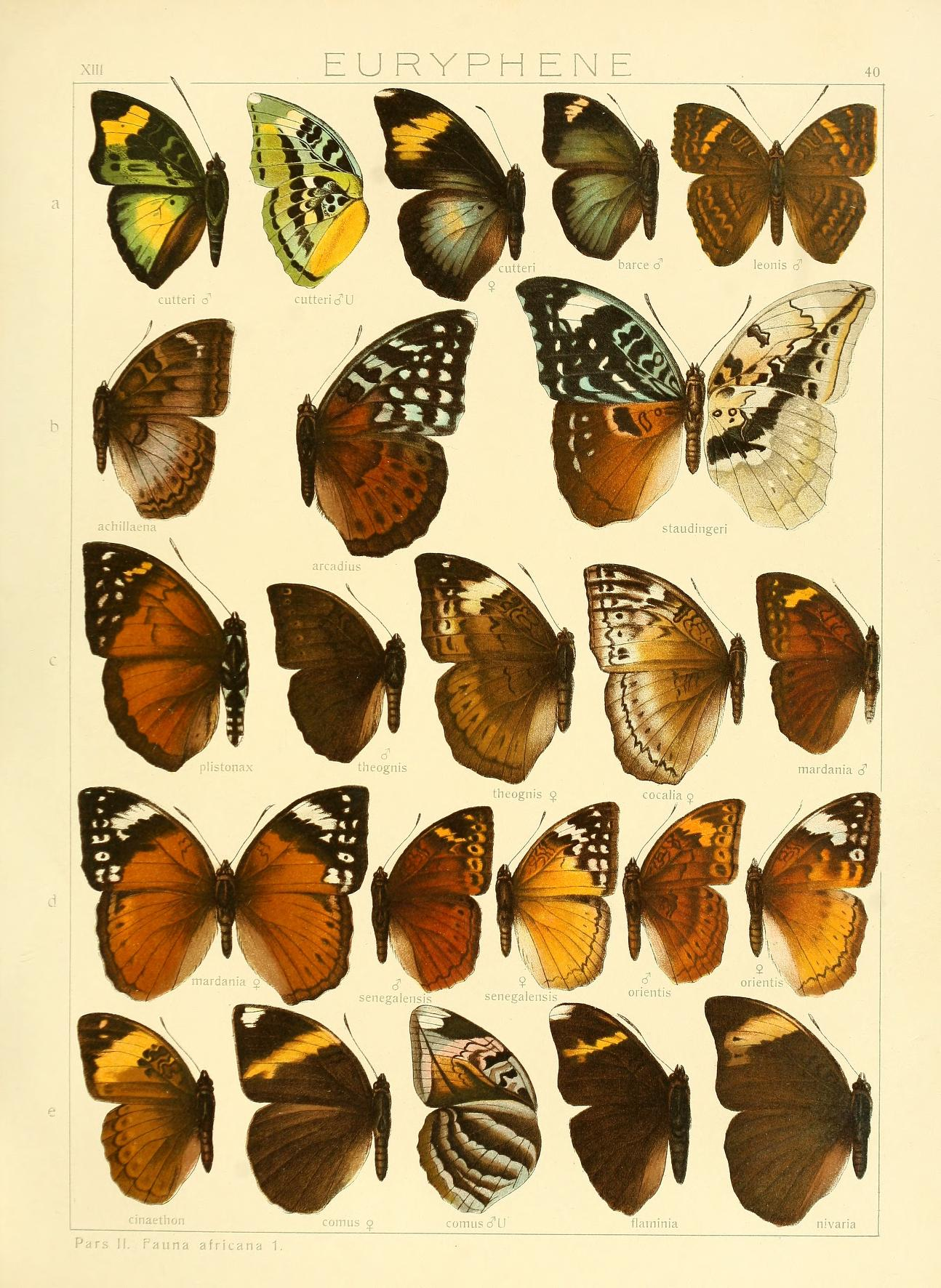
- In Adalbert Seitz's Fauna Africana

Scientific classification
- Kingdom: Animalia
- Phylum: Arthropoda
- Class: Insecta
- Order: Lepidoptera
- Family: Nymphalidae
- Genus: Bebearia
- Species: B. orientis

Binomial name
- Bebearia orientis (Karsch, 1895)

Synonyms
- Euryphene orientis Karsch, 1895; Bebearia (Apectinaria) orientis; Euryphene senegalensis var. pseudocalia Staudinger, 1896; Euryphene mardania dealbata Carcasson, 1958; Bebearia badiana dealbata; Bebearia dealbata taveta Clifton, 1980; Bebearia badiana taveta

= Bebearia orientis =

Species of butterfly

Bebearia orientis, the eastern palm forester, is a butterfly in the family Nymphalidae. It is found in Somalia, Kenya, Tanzania, Mozambique, Malawi, Zambia and Zimbabwe. The habitat consists of forests.

It is very similar to Bebearia senegalensis q.v.

Adults are attracted to fermented fruit. They are probably on wing year round.

The larvae feed on Phoenix reclinata, Raphia farinifera and probably Cocos nucifera.

== Subspecies ==
- B. o. orientis (southern Somalia, eastern Kenya, eastern Tanzania, eastern Zambia)
- B. o. dealbata (Carcasson, 1958) (Kenya)
- B. o. insularis Kielland, 1985 (Tanzania: Pemba Island)
- B. o. malawiensis Holmes, 2001 (southern Malawi, Mozambique, northern and eastern Zimbabwe)
- B. o. taveta Clifton, 1980 (Kenya)
