= Difluoroacetic acid =

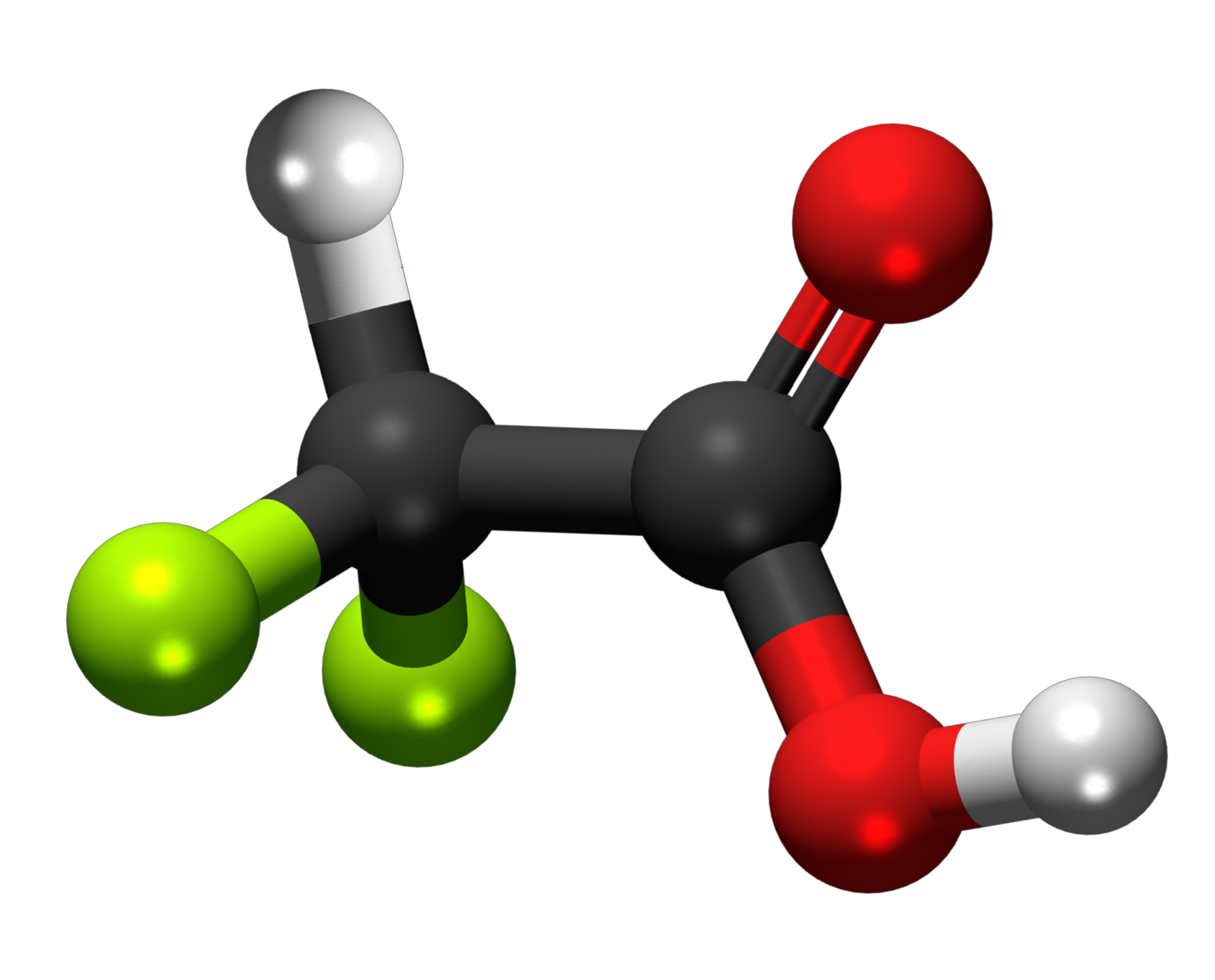

Names
- Preferred IUPAC name Difluoroacetic acid
- Other names 2,2-Difluoroacetic acid

Identifiers
| CAS Number | 381-73-7 |
| 3D model (JSmol) | Interactive image |
| ChemSpider | 10200426 |
| ECHA InfoCard | 100.006.218 |
| PubChem CID | 9788 |
| UNII | ZQK1C95K3N |
| CompTox Dashboard (EPA) | DTXSID50896814 DTXSID2059932, DTXSID50896814 |
- InChI: InChI=1S/C2H2F2O2/c3-1(4)2(5)6/h1H,(H,5,6) Key: PBWZKZYHONABLN-UHFFFAOYSA-N
- SMILES: C(C(=O)O)(F)F

Properties
| Chemical formula | CHF_{2}COOH |
| Molar mass | 96.033 g·mol^{−1} |
| Density | 1.526 g/mL |
| Melting point | −1 °C (30 °F; 272 K) |
| Boiling point | 132–134 °C (270–273 °F; 405–407 K) |
| Acidity (pK_{a}) | 1.33 |
- Except where otherwise noted, data are given for materials in their standard state (at 25 °C [77 °F], 100 kPa). Infobox references

Difluoroacetic acid is a chemical compound with formula CHF_{2}COOH. It is a dihalogenocarboxylic acid, specifically a structural analog of acetic acid with two of three hydrogen atoms on the alpha carbon replaced with fluorine atoms. In solution, it dissociates to form difluoroacetate ions. Difluoroacetic acid can also be used as a direct C-H difluoromethylating reagent.

== See also ==
- Fluoroacetic acid
- Trifluoroacetic acid
