= Fluorooleic acid =

Names
- IUPAC name (9Z)-18-Fluoro-9-octadecenoic acid
- Other names (Z)-18-fluorooctadec-9-enoic acid

Identifiers
CAS Number	1478-37-1
3D model (JSmol)	Interactive image
ChemSpider	4472380
PubChem CID	5312955
UNII	Z49M478WU7
- InChI: InChI=1S/C18H33FO2/c19-17-15-13-11-9-7-5-3-1-2-4-6-8-10-12-14-16-18(20)21/h1-2H,3-17H2,(H,20,21)/b2-1- Key: XZCKFYWUUUBKNC-UPHRSURJSA-N
- SMILES: C(CCCCF)CCC/C=C\CCCCCCCC(=O)O

Properties
Chemical formula	C_{18}H_{33}FO_{2}
Molar mass	300.458 g·mol^{−1}
- Except where otherwise noted, data are given for materials in their standard state (at 25 °C [77 °F], 100 kPa). Infobox references

Fluorooleic acid is a naturally occurring, unsaturated, and fluorinated fatty acid. The Delta notation is 18-F-18:1-delta-9c.

== Natural occurrence ==
Fluoroleic acid, along with some other ω-fluoro-substituted fatty acids, occurs at about 10–20% in the seed oil of Dichapetalum toxicarium, a plant native to Sierra Leone in West Africa.

== Biosynthesis ==
Unlike many other plants, Dichapetalum toxicarium can accumulate much more fluoride, even when the soil content is not particularly high. In young leaves, this is converted into monofluoroacetate, which is stored in the leaves around the flowers. During seed formation, the fluoroacetate is transferred there and converted into long-chain fluorinated fatty acids, including fluorooleic acid.

== Synthesis ==
One method starts with 8-fluorooctanol, which is first reacted with phosphorus tribromide. The product of this reaction is then reacted with sodium acetylide in xylene/DMF. Then, the reaction takes place with 1-chloro-7-iodoheptane and metallic lithium in liquid ammonia and finally with sodium cyanide in DMSO, yielding the nitrile of fluorooleic acid. This reacts with hydrogen peroxide and potassium hydroxide in acetone to form the amide, and then with potassium hydroxide in ethanol to form the carboxylic acid. The triple bond can be converted into a (Z)-double bond by Lindlar catalyst.

Fluoroleic acid can also be isolated from Dichapetalum toxicarium. A chromatography method optimized for the separation of fluorinated fatty acids has been published.

== Toxicology ==
Fluorooleic acid is responsible for the toxicity of Dichapetalum toxicarium fruits, which have been used as rat poison. Oral LD_{50} values of fluorooleic acid for various animals have been determined; these are 6 mg/kg for rats, 1.5 mg/kg for guinea pigs, 2.5 mg/kg for pigeons, 0.5 mg/kg for rabbits, and 2 mg/kg for sheep. In many cases, death was delayed and sudden, presumably due to cardiac arrest.

== See also ==
- Fluorocitric acid
- Fluoroacetic acid
