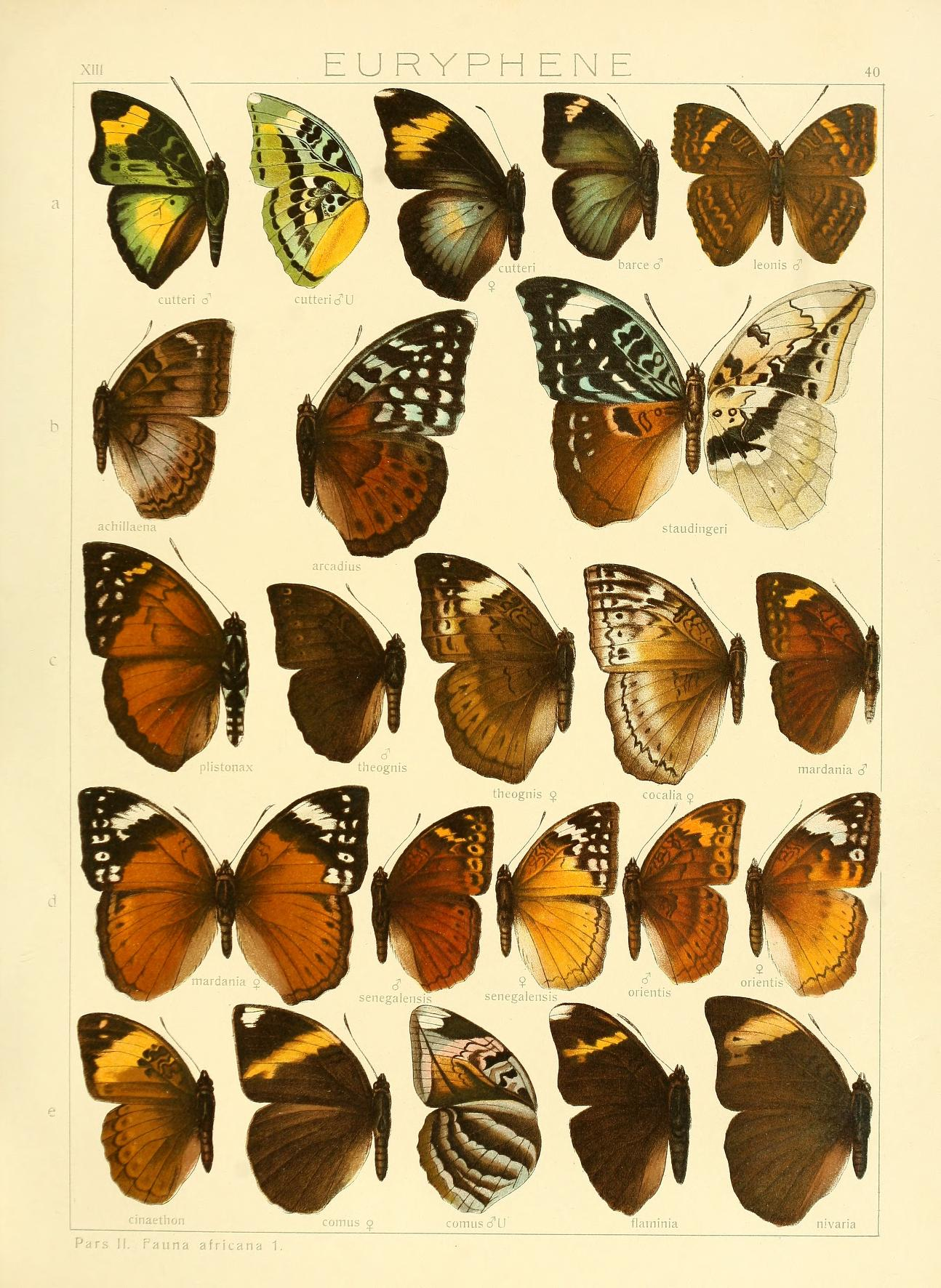
- In Adalbert Seitz's Fauna Africana

Scientific classification
- Kingdom: Animalia
- Phylum: Arthropoda
- Class: Insecta
- Order: Lepidoptera
- Family: Nymphalidae
- Genus: Bebearia
- Species: B. senegalensis

Binomial name
- Bebearia senegalensis (Herrich-Schaeffer, 1858)

Synonyms
- Euryphene senegalensis Herrich-Schaeffer, 1858; Bebearia (Apectinaria) senegalensis; Bebearia cocalia senegalensis

= Bebearia senegalensis =

Species of butterfly

Bebearia senegalensis, the Senegal palm forester, is a butterfly in the family Nymphalidae. It is found in Senegal, the Gambia, Guinea-Bissau, northern Guinea, northern Sierra Leone and northern Ivory Coast. The habitat consists of dry forests and Guinea savanna.

E. senegalensis H.-Schaff. (40 d) is very similar to mardania, but differs in the narrower subapical band of the forewing and in the female also in the darker, dirty grey-brown or yellowish brown, ground colour of the upper surface. Senegal and Sierra Leone. -— orientis Karsch [now species] (40 d) has the ground-colour in both sexes orange, at the base yellow-brown, and bears a broader subapical band on the forewing. German East Africa.

The larvae feed on Raphia palma-pinus.

== Taxonomy ==
It is a part of the Bebearia mardania species complex
