= Aconitate hydratase, cytoplasmic =

Enzyme found in humans

ACO1

Identifiers
- Aliases: ACO1, ACONS, HEL60, IREB1, IREBP, IREBP1, IRP1, aconitase 1
- External IDs: OMIM: 100880; MGI: 87879; GeneCards: ACO1
Available structures
PDB	Ortholog search: PDBe RCSB
PDB	List of PDB id codes 2B3X, 2B3Y
Enzyme activity
EC #	BRENDA	ExPASy	KEGG	MetaCyc
4.2.1.3	↗	↗	↗	↗

Gene location (Human)
Chr.	Chromosome 9 (human)
Band	9p21.1	Start	32,384,603 bp
Band	9p21.1	End	32,454,769 bp

Gene location (Mouse)
Chr.	Chromosome 4 (mouse)
Band	4 A5|4 20.24 cM	Start	40,143,081 bp
Band	4 A5|4 20.24 cM	End	40,198,338 bp
RNA expression pattern
Bgee	Human / Mouse (ortholog); Top expressed in: right lobe of liver; stromal cell of endometrium; right adrenal gland; right adrenal cortex; adipose tissue; left adrenal gland; kidney tubule; subcutaneous adipose tissue; duodenum; jejunal mucosa / Top expressed in: tunica adventitia of aorta; external carotid artery; internal carotid artery; migratory enteric neural crest cell; dermis; efferent ductule; carotid body; tunica media of zone of aorta; submandibular gland; proximal tubule; More reference expression data
BioGPS	n/a
Gene ontology
Molecular function	iron-sulfur cluster binding; metal ion binding; protein binding; lyase activity; RNA binding; aconitate hydratase activity; iron-responsive element binding; 3 iron, 4 sulfur cluster binding; 4 iron, 4 sulfur cluster binding
Cellular component	Golgi apparatus; endoplasmic reticulum; mitochondrion; extracellular exosome; cytoplasm; cytosol
Biological process	response to iron(II) ion; tricarboxylic acid cycle; post-embryonic development; regulation of gene expression; intestinal absorption; metabolism; regulation of translation; citrate metabolic process; cellular iron ion homeostasis
Sources:Amigo / QuickGO
Orthologs
Databases	NCBI: entry; OMA: entry
Species	Human	Mouse
Entrez	48	11428
Ensembl	ENSG00000122729	ENSMUSG00000028405
UniProt	P21399	P28271
RefSeq (mRNA)	NM_001278352; NM_002197; NM_001362840	NM_007386
RefSeq (protein)	NP_001265281; NP_002188; NP_001349769	NP_031412
Location (UCSC)	Chr 9: 32.38 – 32.45 Mb	Chr 4: 40.14 – 40.2 Mb
PubMed search
- Wikidata
View/Edit Human	View/Edit Mouse

Cytoplasmic aconitate hydratase, also called Aconitase 1, is an enzyme that in humans is encoded by the ACO1 gene. This form of aconitase is located in the cytoplasm and functions as an iron sensor.

== Function ==
The protein encoded by this gene is a bifunctional, cytosolic protein that functions as an enzyme and interacts with mRNA to control the levels of iron inside cells. When cellular iron levels are high, this protein binds to a 4Fe-4S cluster and functions as an aconitase. Aconitases are iron-sulfur proteins that function to catalyze the conversion of citrate to isocitrate. When cellular iron levels are low, the protein binds to iron-responsive elements (IREs), which are stem-loop structures found in the 5' UTR of ferritin mRNA, and in the 3' UTR of transferrin receptor mRNA. When the protein binds to IRE, it results in repression of translation of ferritin mRNA, and inhibition of degradation of the otherwise rapidly degraded transferrin receptor mRNA. The encoded protein has been identified as a moonlighting protein based on its ability to perform mechanistically distinct functions. Alternative splicing results in multiple transcript variants.
