= Fluoroacetic acid =

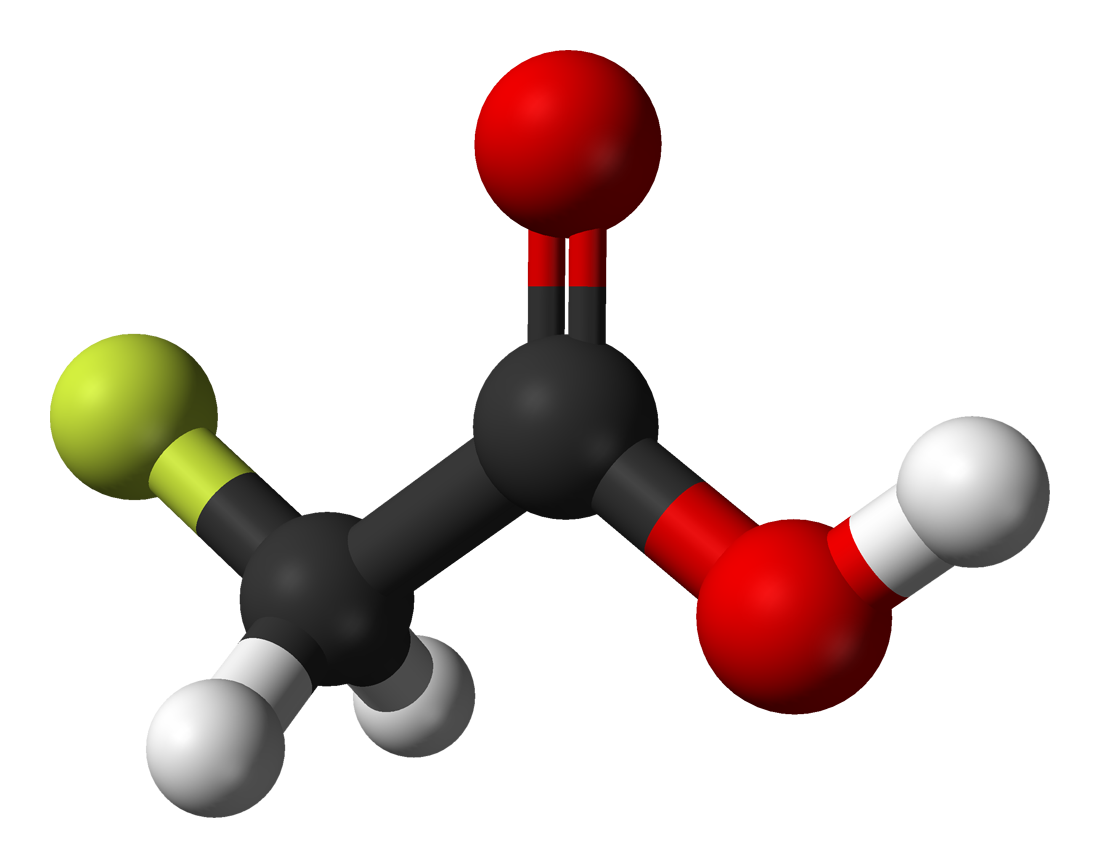
- Carbon, C Hydrogen, H Oxygen, O Fluorine, F

Names
- Preferred IUPAC name Fluoroacetic acid
- Other names: 2-Fluoroacetic acid; Cymonic acid; Fluoroethanoic acid; Monofluoroacetic acid

Identifiers
CAS Number	144-49-0
3D model (JSmol)	Interactive image
Beilstein Reference	1739053
ChEBI	CHEBI:30775
ChEMBL	ChEMBL509273
ChemSpider	10205670
ECHA InfoCard	100.005.120
EC Number	205-631-7
Gmelin Reference	25730
KEGG	C06108
PubChem CID	5237
RTECS number	AH5950000
UNII	AP1JV9U41M
UN number	2642
CompTox Dashboard (EPA)	DTXSID0041981
- InChI: InChI=1S/C2H3FO2/c3-1-2(4)5/h1H2,(H,4,5) Key: QEWYKACRFQMRMB-UHFFFAOYSA-N; InChI=1/C2H3FO2/c3-1-2(4)5/h1H2,(H,4,5) Key: QEWYKACRFQMRMB-UHFFFAOYAF
- SMILES: FCC(O)=O

Properties
Chemical formula	FCH_{2}CO_{2}H
Molar mass	78.042 g·mol^{−1}
Appearance	White solid
Density	1.369 g/cm^{3}
Melting point	35.2 °C (95.4 °F; 308.3 K)
Boiling point	165 °C (329 °F; 438 K)
Solubility in water	Soluble in water and ethanol
Acidity (pK_{a})	2.6

Hazards
- Occupational safety and health (OHS/OSH)
Main hazards	Highly toxic and corrosive
- GHS labelling
Pictograms	(GHS05: Corrosive) (GHS06: Toxic) (GHS09: Environmental hazard)
Signal word	Danger
Hazard statements	H300, H314, H400
Precautionary statements	P260, P264, P270, P273, P280, P301+P310, P301+P330+P331, P303+P361+P353, P304+P340, P305+P351+P338, P310, P321, P330, P363, P391, P405, P501
- Lethal dose or concentration (LD, LC)
LD_{50} (median dose)	7 mg/kg (rat, oral)

Related compounds
Related compounds	Difluoroacetic acid; Trifluoroacetic acid; Chloroacetic acid; Bromoacetic acid; Iodoacetic acid; Acetic acid; Haloacetic acids; Fluoroacetamide; Sodium fluoroacetate
- Except where otherwise noted, data are given for materials in their standard state (at 25 °C [77 °F], 100 kPa). Infobox references

Fluoroacetic acid is an organofluorine compound with the chemical formula FCH_{2}CO_{2}H. It is a colorless solid that is noted for its relatively high toxicity. The conjugate base, fluoroacetate occurs naturally in at least 40 plants in Australia, Brazil, and Africa. It is one of only about twenty known organofluorine-containing natural products.

== Toxicity ==
Fluoroacetic acid is a harmful metabolite of some fluorine-containing drugs (median lethal dose, LD_{50} = 10 mg/kg in humans). The most common metabolic sources of fluoroacetic acid are fluoroamines and fluoroethers. Fluoroacetic acid can disrupt the Krebs cycle. The metabolite of fluoroacetic acid is fluorocitric acid, which is very toxic because it is not processable using aconitase in the Krebs cycle (where fluorocitrate takes place of citrate as the substrate). The enzyme is inhibited and the cycle stops working.

In contrast with fluoroacetic acid, difluoroacetic acid and trifluoroacetic acid are far less toxic. Its pK_{a} is approx. 2.6, in contrast to 1.3 and 0.5 for the respective di- and trifluoroacetic acid.

== Manufacture and uses ==
The main use of fluoroacetic acid is as a pesticide, especially rodenticides such as sodium fluoroacetate (compound 1080), which are salts of the acid. The overall market is projected to rise at a considerable rate during the forecast period, 2021 to 2027. Sodium fluoroacetate is manufactured by treating sodium chloroacetate with potassium fluoride and the parent acid can be obtained by neutralization and distillation.

== See also ==
- Chloroacetic acid
- Fluorocitric acid
- Fluorooleic acid
