= Aconitase =

Class of enzymes

aconitate hydratase
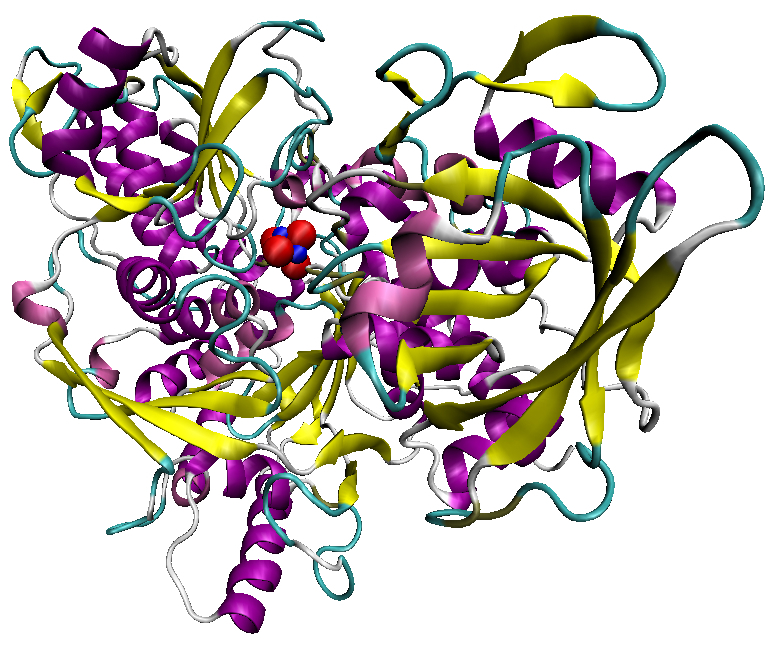
- Illustration of pig aconitase in complex with the [Fe_{4}S_{4}] cluster. The protein is colored by secondary structure, and iron atoms are blue and the sulfur red.

Identifiers
- EC no.: 4.2.1.3
- CAS no.: 9024-25-3

Databases
- BRENDA: enzyme data
- ExPASy: NiceZyme view
- KEGG: enzyme entry
- MetaCyc: metabolic pathway
- Rhea: reactions
- PDB structures: RCSB PDB PDBe PDBsum
- Gene Ontology: AmiGO / QuickGO
Search
- PMC: articles
- PubMed: articles
- NCBI: proteins

Aconitase family (aconitate hydratase)
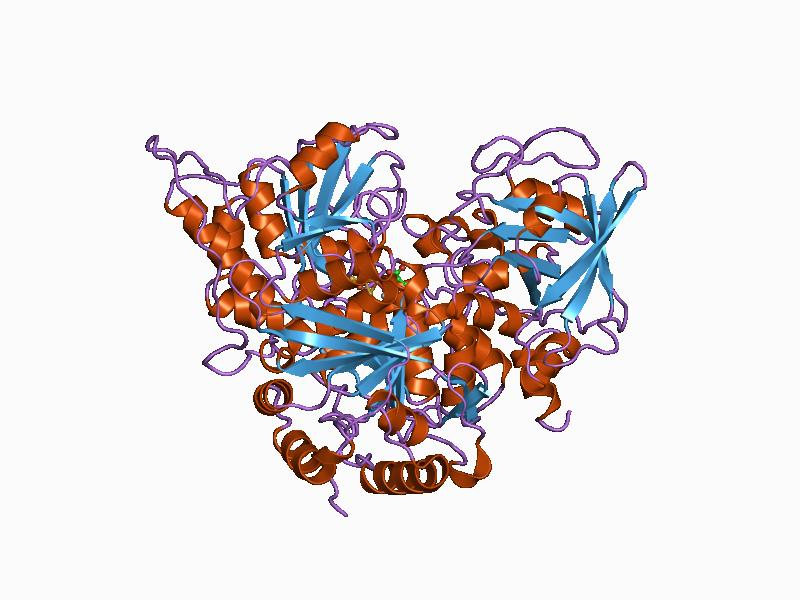
- Structure of aconitase.

Identifiers
- Symbol: Aconitase
- Pfam: PF00330
- InterPro: IPR001030
- PROSITE: PDOC00423
- SCOP2: 1aco / SCOPe / SUPFAM
Available protein structures:
- PDB: IPR001030 PF00330 (ECOD; PDBsum)
- AlphaFold: IPR001030; PF00330

Aconitase (aconitate hydratase; EC 4.2.1.3) is an enzyme that catalyses the stereo-specific isomerization of citrate to isocitrate via cis-aconitate in the tricarboxylic acid cycle, a non-redox-active process.

Citric acid

Aconitic acid

Isocitric acid

== Structure ==
Aconitase has two slightly different structures, depending on whether it is activated or inactivated. In the inactive form, its structure is divided into four domains. Counting from the N-terminus, only the first three of these domains are involved in close interactions with the [3Fe-4S] cluster, but the active site consists of residues from all four domains, including the larger C-terminal domain. The Fe-S cluster and a SO^{2−}_{4} anion also reside in the active site. When the enzyme is activated, it gains an additional iron atom, creating a [4Fe-4S] cluster. However, the structure of the rest of the enzyme is nearly unchanged; the conserved atoms between the two forms are in essentially the same positions, up to a difference of 0.1 angstroms.

== Function ==
In contrast with the majority of iron–sulfur proteins that function as electron carriers, the iron–sulfur cluster of aconitase reacts directly with an enzyme substrate. Aconitase has an active [Fe_{4}S_{4}]^{2+} cluster, which may convert to an inactive [Fe_{3}S_{4}]^{+} form. Three cysteine (Cys) residues have been shown to be ligands of the [Fe_{4}S_{4}] centre. In the active state, the labile iron ion of the [Fe_{4}S_{4}] cluster is not coordinated by Cys but by water molecules.

The iron-responsive element-binding protein (IRE-BP) and 3-isopropylmalate dehydratase (α-isopropylmalate isomerase; EC 4.2.1.33), an enzyme catalysing the second step in the biosynthesis of leucine, are known aconitase homologues. Iron regulatory elements (IREs) constitute a family of 28-nucleotide, non-coding, stem-loop structures that regulate iron storage, heme synthesis and iron uptake. They also participate in ribosome binding and control the mRNA turnover (degradation). The specific regulatory protein, the IRE-BP, binds to IREs in both 5' and 3' regions, but only to RNA in its apo form (without the Fe–S cluster). Expression of IRE-BP in cultured cells has revealed that the protein functions either as an active aconitase, when cells are iron-replete, or as an active RNA-binding protein, when cells are iron-depleted. Mutant IRE-BPs, in which any or all of the three Cys residues involved in Fe–S formation are replaced by serine, have no aconitase activity, but retain RNA-binding properties.

Aconitase is inhibited by fluoroacetate, therefore fluoroacetate is poisonous. Fluoroacetate, in the citric acid cycle, is converted to fluorocitrate by citrate synthase. Fluorocitrate competitively inhibits aconitase halting the citric acid cycle. The iron–sulfur cluster is highly sensitive to oxidation by superoxide.

=== Mechanism ===
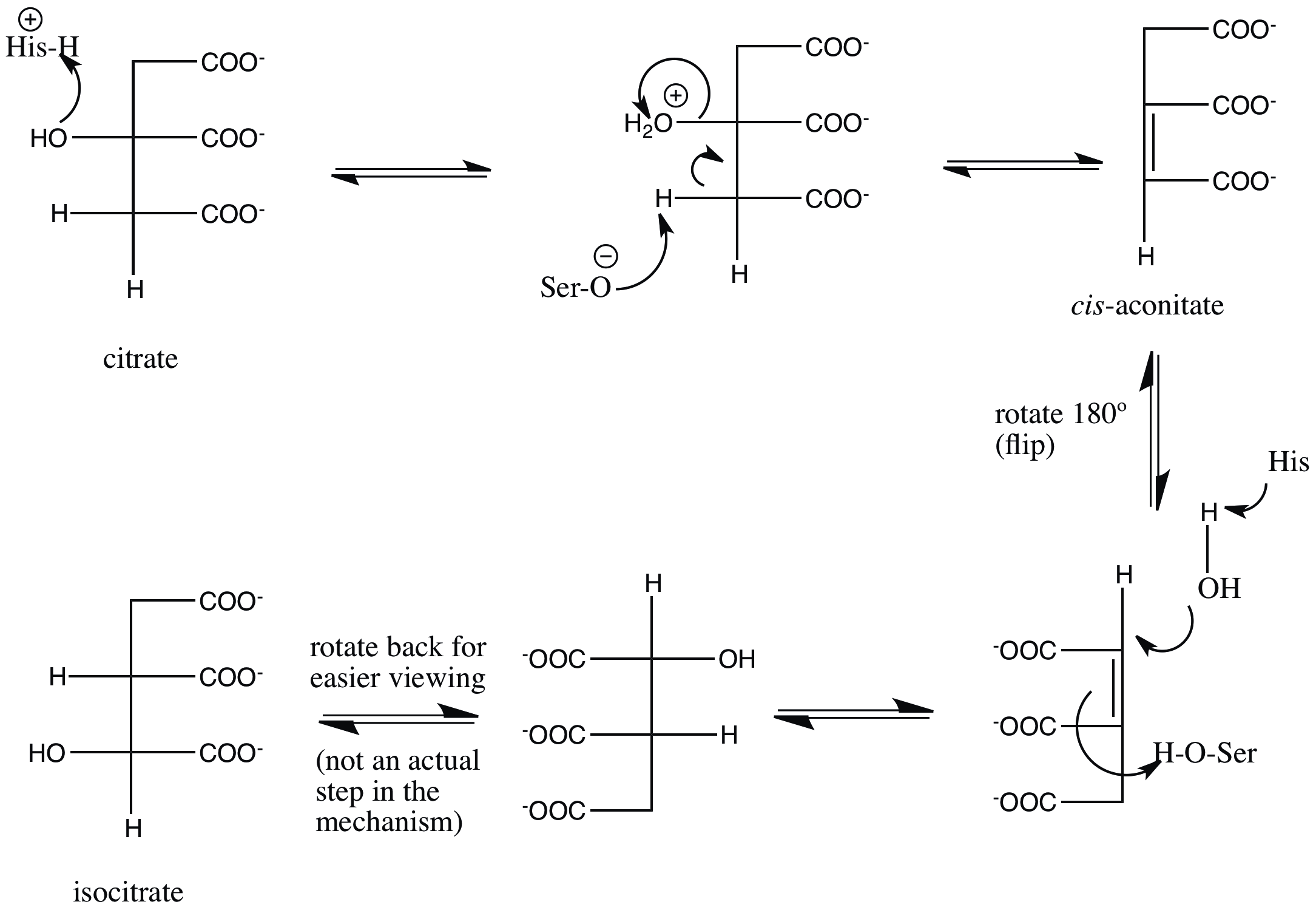
Aconitase arrow-pushing mechanism

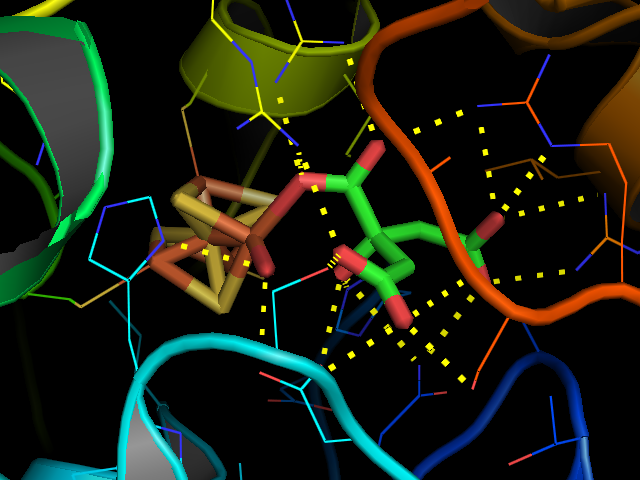
Citrate and the Fe–S cluster in the active site of aconitase: dashed yellow lines show interactions between the substrate and nearby residues

Aconitase employs a dehydration-hydration mechanism. The catalytic residues involved are His-101 and Ser-642. His-101 protonates the hydroxyl group on C3 of citrate, allowing it to leave as water, and Ser-642 concurrently abstracts the proton on C2, creating a double bond between C2 and C3, and forming the so-called cis-aconitate intermediate (the two carboxyl groups on the double bond are cis). The carbon atom from which the hydrogen is removed is the one that came from oxaloacetate in the previous step of the citric acid cycle, not the one that came from acetyl CoA, even though these two carbons are equivalent except that one is "pro-R" and the other "pro-S" (see Prochirality). At this point, the intermediate is rotated 180°. This rotation is referred to as a "flip." Because of this flip, the intermediate is said to move from a "citrate mode" to a "isocitrate mode."

How exactly this flip occurs is debatable. One theory is that, in the rate-limiting step of the mechanism, the cis-aconitate is released from the enzyme, then reattached in the isocitrate mode to complete the reaction. This rate-limiting step ensures that the right stereochemistry, specifically (2R,3S), is formed in the final product. Another hypothesis is that cis-aconitate stays bound to the enzyme while it flips from the citrate to the isocitrate mode.

In either case, flipping cis-aconitate allows the dehydration and hydration steps to occur on opposite faces of the intermediate. Aconitase catalyzes trans elimination/addition of water, and the flip guarantees that the correct stereochemistry is formed in the product. To complete the reaction, the serine and histidine residues reverse their original catalytic actions: the histidine, now basic, abstracts a proton from water, priming it as a nucleophile to attack at C2, and the protonated serine is deprotonated by the cis-aconitate double bond to complete the hydration, producing isocitrate.

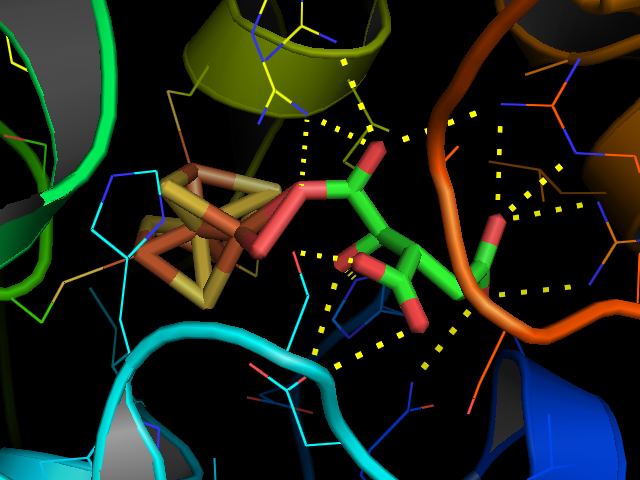
Isocitrate and the Fe–S cluster in the active site of aconitasePDB: 1C97;

== Family members ==
Aconitases are expressed in bacteria to humans. In citrus fruits, a reduction of the activity of the mitochondrial aconitases likely leads to the buildup of citric acid, which is then stored in vacuoles. As the fruit matures, citric acid is returned back to the cytosol where an increase in cytosolic aconitase activity reduces its levels in the fruit. Humans express the following two aconitase isozymes:

aconitase 1, soluble

Identifiers
- Symbol: ACO1
- Alt. symbols: IREB1
- NCBI gene: 48
- HGNC: 117
- OMIM: 100880
- RefSeq: NM_002197
- UniProt: P21399

Other data
- EC number: 4.2.1.3
- Locus: Chr. 9 p21.1
Search for
- Structures: Swiss-model
- Domains: InterPro

aconitase 2, mitochondrial

Identifiers
- Symbol: ACO2
- Alt. symbols: ACONM
- NCBI gene: 50
- HGNC: 118
- OMIM: 100850
- RefSeq: NM_001098
- UniProt: Q99798

Other data
- EC number: 4.2.1.3
- Locus: Chr. 22 q13.2
Search for
- Structures: Swiss-model
- Domains: InterPro

== Interactive pathway map ==
Click on genes, proteins and metabolites below to link to respective articles. (Note: The interactive pathway map can be edited at WikiPathways: "TCACycle_WP78".)

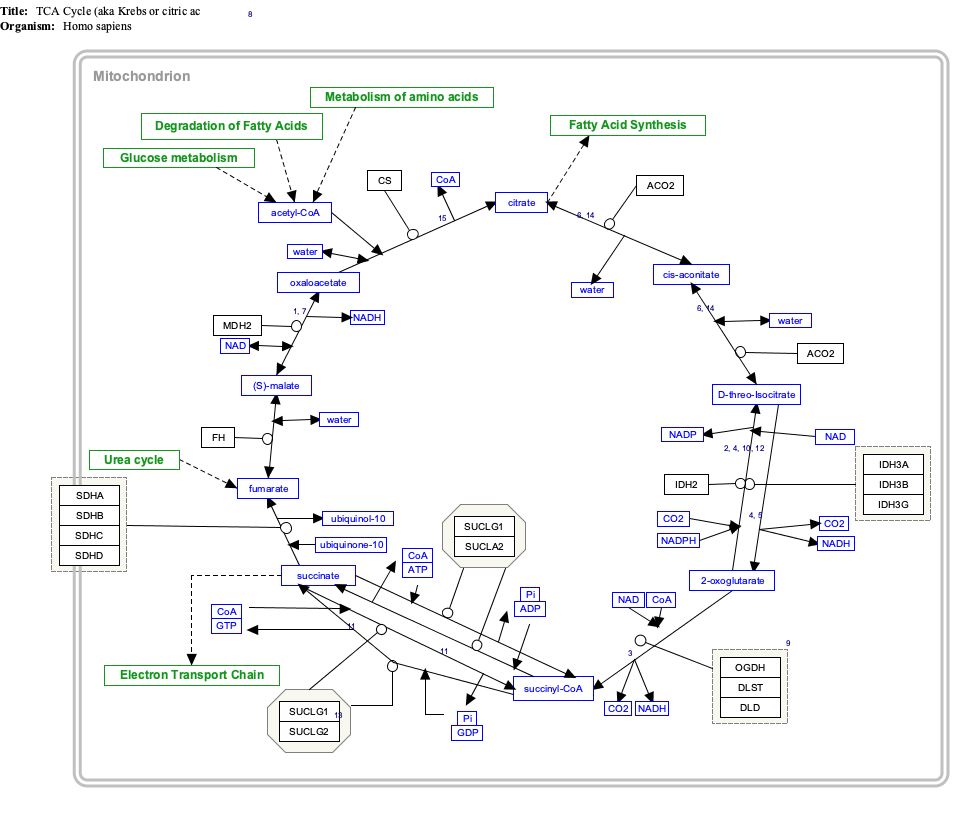

TCACycle_WP78 edit
