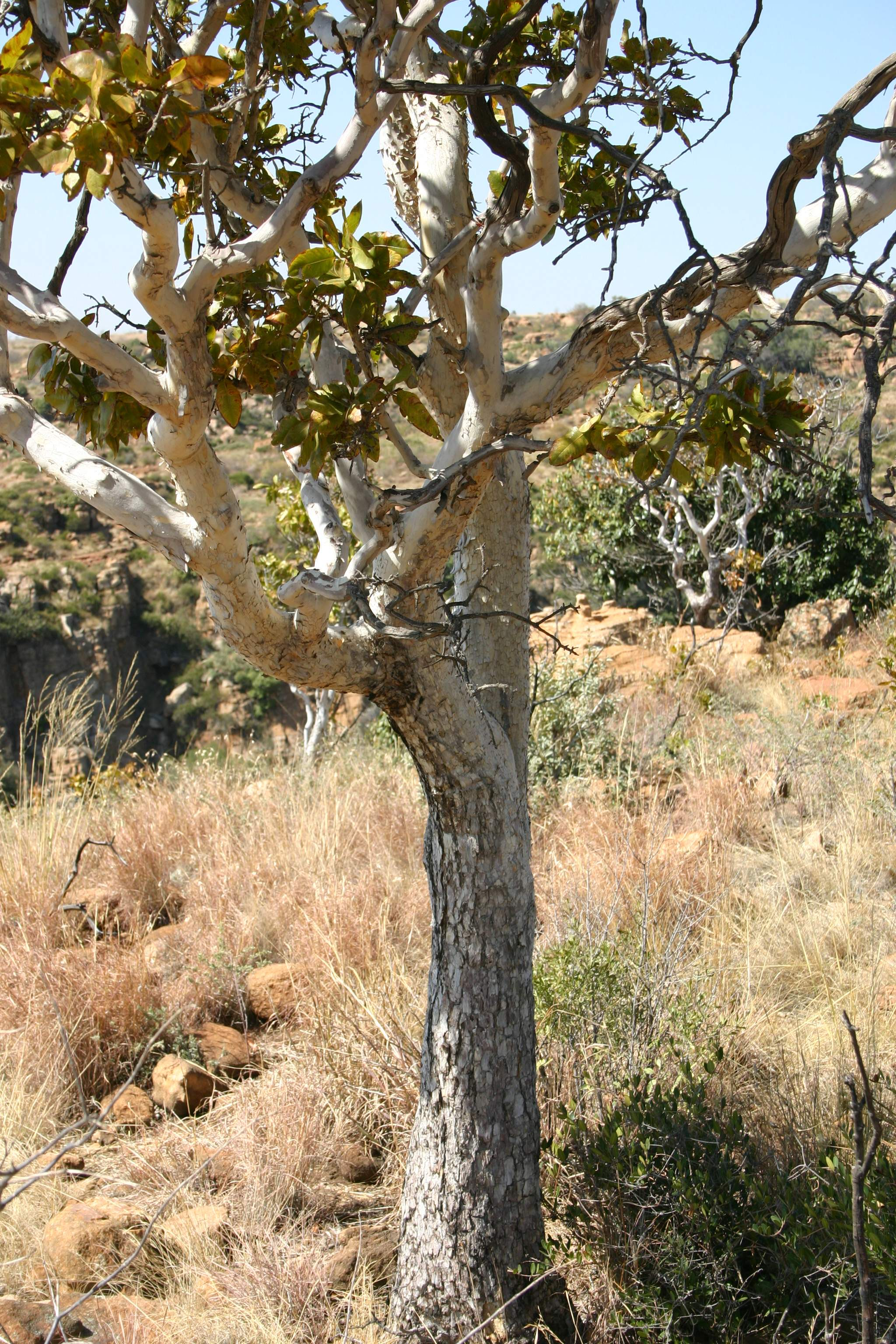

Scientific classification
- Kingdom: Plantae
- Clade: Tracheophytes
- Clade: Angiosperms
- Clade: Eudicots
- Clade: Rosids
- Order: Malpighiales
- Family: Ochnaceae
- Genus: Ochna
- Species: O. pulchra

Binomial name
- Ochna pulchra Hook.

= Ochna pulchra =

Species of tree

Ochna pulchra, also known as Lekkerbreek (Afrikaans 'breaking easily', i.e. 'brittle'), is a small deciduous southern African tree up to 5 m, commonly found on deep sandy soil and rocky slopes, and belonging to the tropical family of Ochnaceae, which is widespread in Asia and Africa.

== Description ==
Its bark is distinctive, peeling in thin flakes to expose creamy-white underbark, similar in appearance to that of Corymbia maculata, guava or Pride-of-India.

Spring foliage has an oily appearance to the surface and ranges from light green to bronze or bright red, turning to a fresh, shiny green when mature. Lemon-yellow flowers appear in great abundance in spring, the persistent yellow-green calyx turning pink then bright red. The fruit, a kidney-shaped drupe, is initially green maturing to black.

== Range ==
The tree occurs in the central Transvaal and northern Kruger National Park, extending further to Mozambique, Zimbabwe, Botswana, Angola, Zambia and the Democratic Republic of Congo.

It is an indicator species of so-called Gifveld, that is veld where the toxic Dichapetalum cymosum is present, which is small and easily overlooked.

== Gallery ==
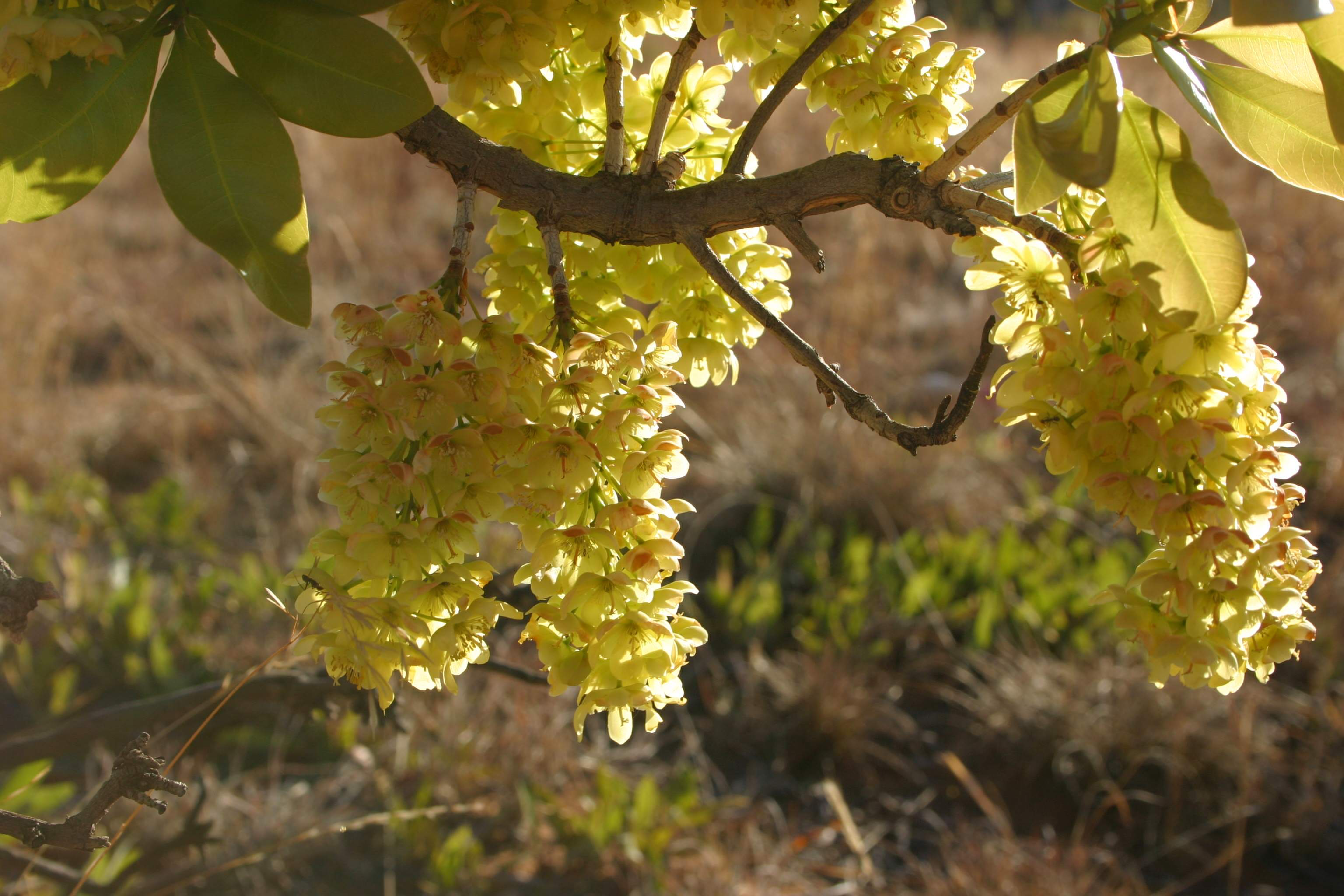
Inflorescences in spring

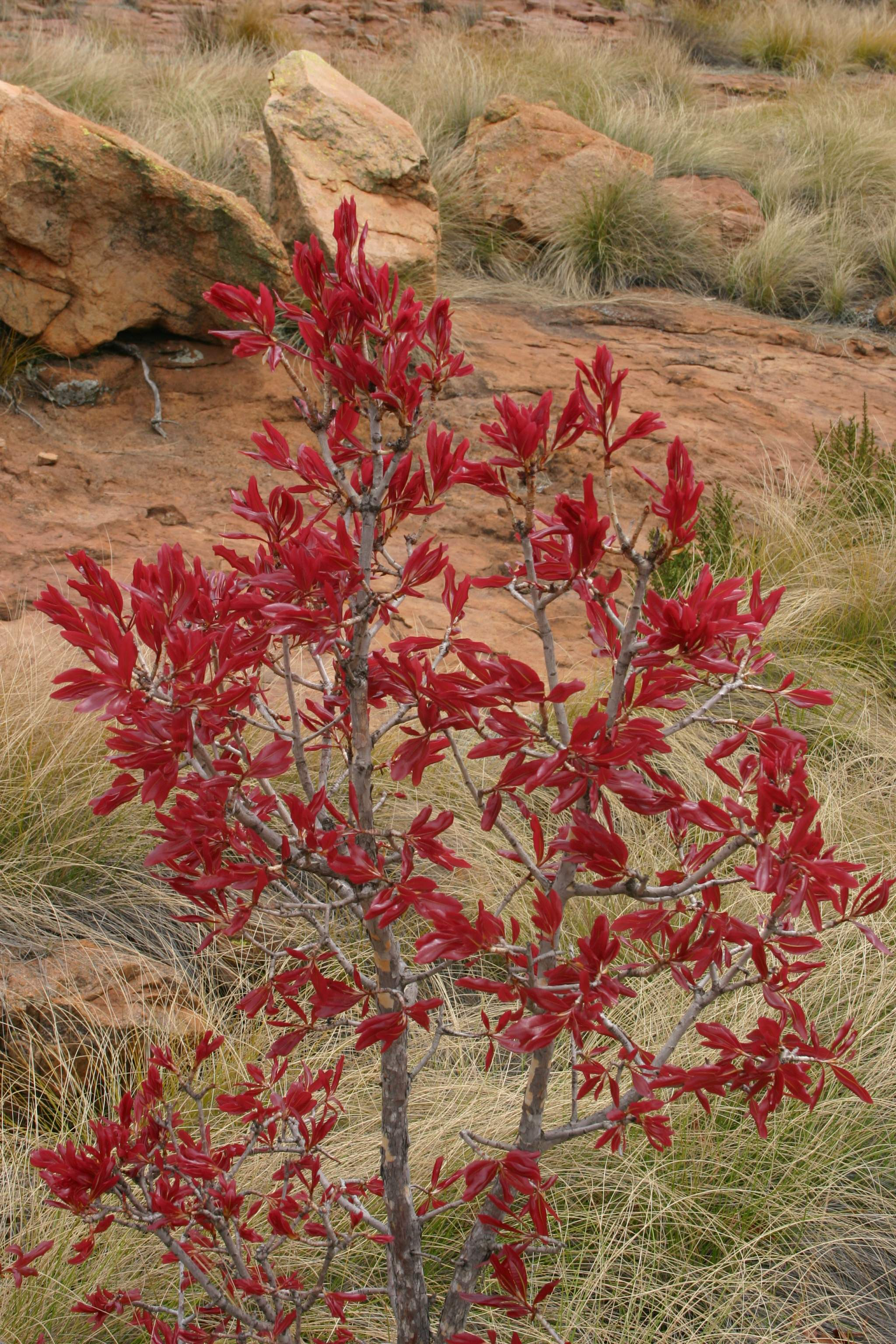
Emerging spring foliage

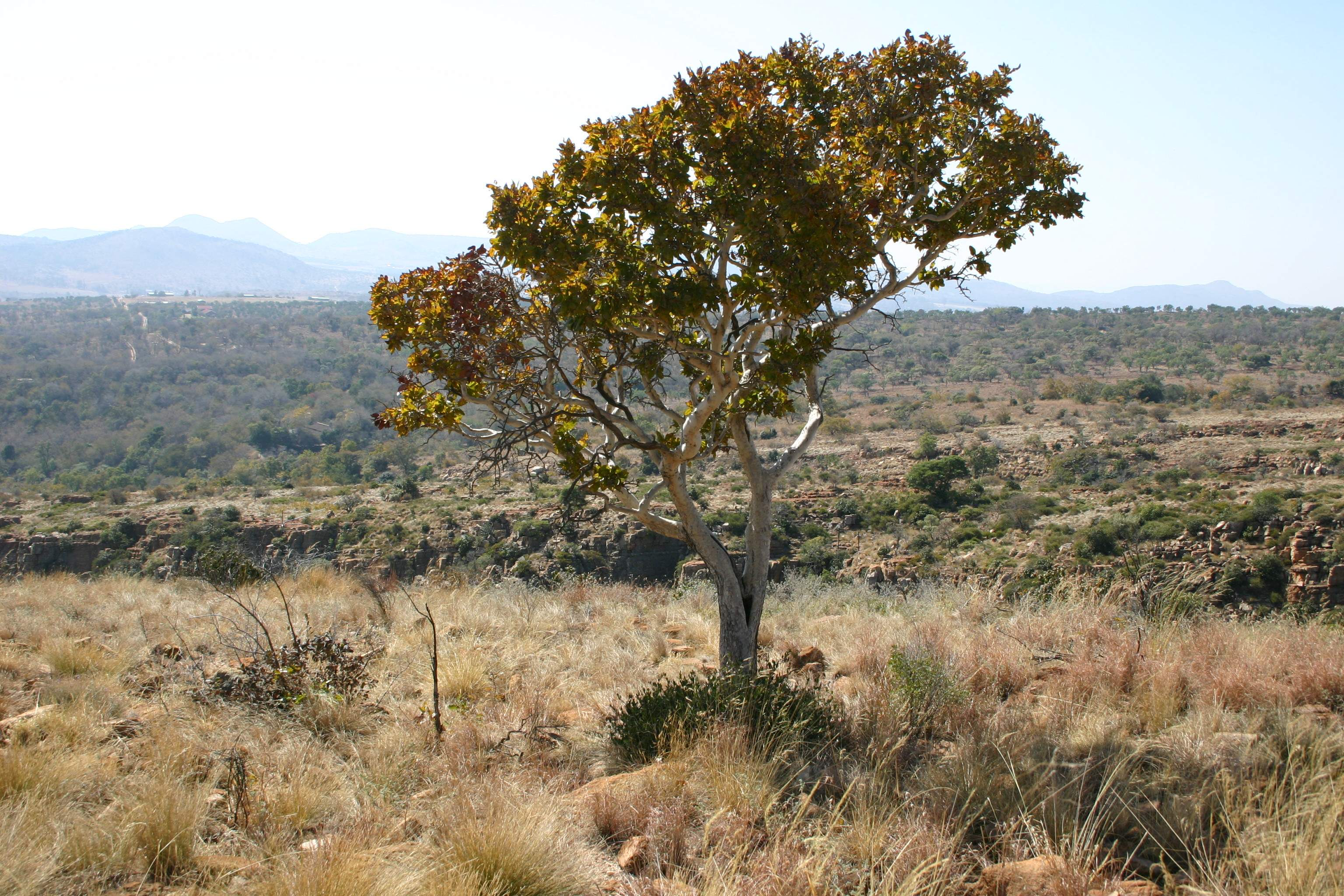
Habit and habitat

== Bibliography ==
Media related to Ochna pulchra at Wikimedia Commons

- Trees and Shrubs of Mpumalanga and Kruger National Park - Schmidt, Lötter & McCleland (Jacana Books, Johannesburg, 2002)
- Trees and Shrubs of the Witwatersrand - Tree Society of Southern Africa (Witwatersrand University Press, Johannesburg, 1969)
- Field Guide to the Wild Flowers of the Witwatersrand & Pretoria Region - van Wyk & Malan (Struik, Cape Town, 1988)
- Field Guide to the Trees of South Africa - van Wyk & van Wyk, 1997, ISBN 1-86825-922-6
