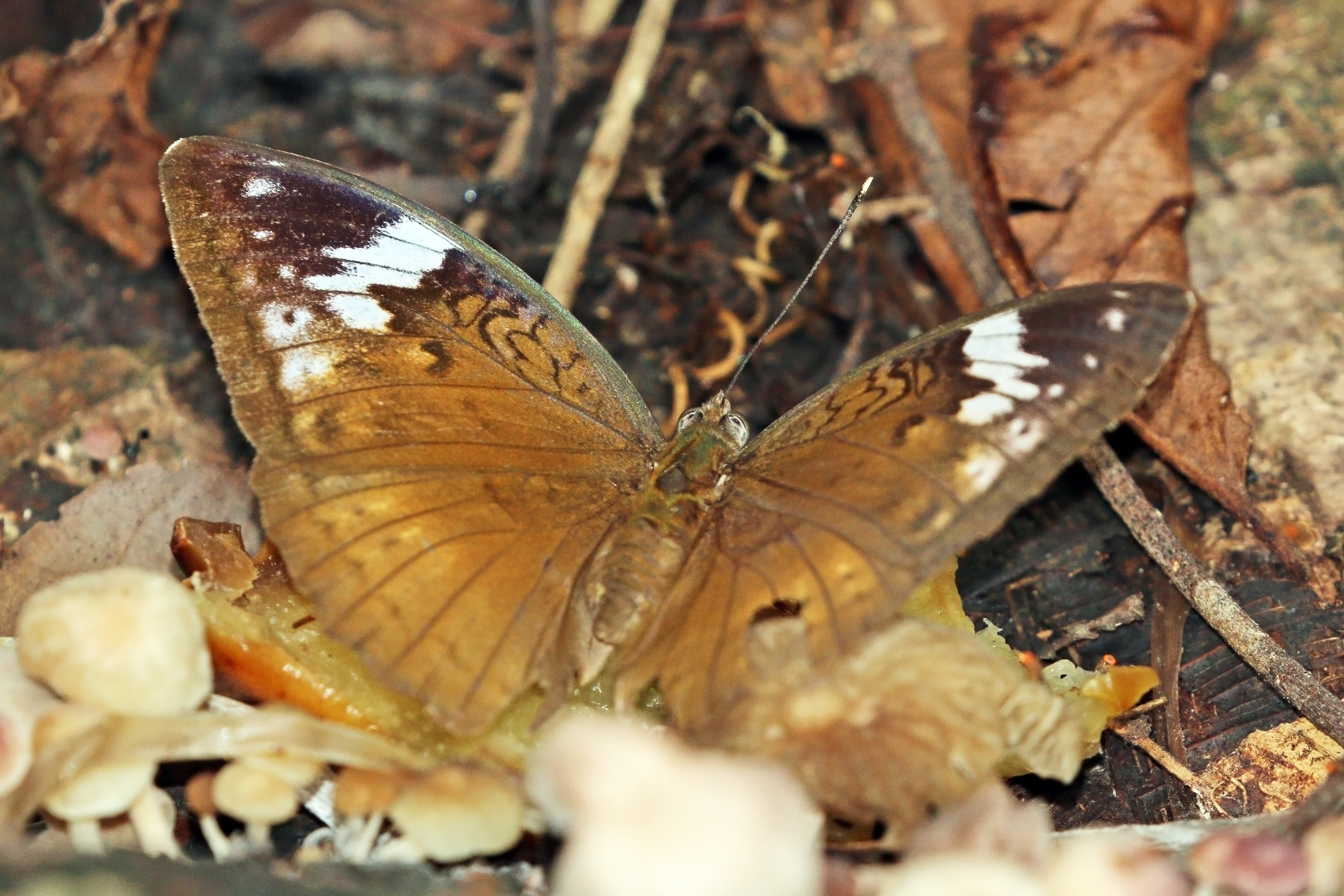
- Nominate morph female Kakum National Park, Ghana

Scientific classification
- Kingdom: Animalia
- Phylum: Arthropoda
- Clade: Pancrustacea
- Class: Insecta
- Order: Lepidoptera
- Family: Nymphalidae
- Genus: Bebearia
- Species: B. mardania

Binomial name
- Bebearia mardania (Fabricius, 1793)

Synonyms
- Papilio mardania Fabricius, 1793; Bebearia (Apectinaria) mardania; Euryphene theogonis Hewitson, 1864; Bebearia theognis

= Bebearia mardania =

Dark palm forester

Species of insect

Bebearia mardania, the dark palm forester, is a butterfly in the family Nymphalidae. It is found in Guinea, Sierra Leone, Liberia, Ivory Coast, Ghana, Togo, Nigeria, western Cameroon and the Republic of the Congo. The habitat consists of forests.

In the male the hindwing and the basal half of the forewing are dark red-brown and the apical half of the forewing blackish with broad, sharply defined yellow subapical band; the postdiscal spots are on the forewing more or less distinctly ringed with yellow or whitish and on the hindwing posteriorly indistinct; transverse bands 2 and 3 are suppressed or very indistinct in the red-brown part. In the female the hindwing and the basal half of the forewing are brown-yellow and the apical half of the forewing black with broad white subapical band and white rings or marginal spots to the postdiscal spots; in the brown-yellow colour only the submarginal line and the postdiscal spots of the hindwing stand out distinctly. — Pupa glossy green with yellowish dorsal spine and transverse band on the third abdominal segment and small yellowish elevations on the following segments; spiracles black. Gold Coast to Angola and Uganda; common.

The larvae feed on Phoenix reclinata, Hyphaene thebaica the Borassus palm and the coconut palm.

Torben Larsen developed a species numbering system for his 2005 publication Butterflies of West Africa. This species is #1008. The 'Larsen' numbers have since been used with permission in A Sharp Eye on Butterflies of Ghana.

== Taxonomy ==
It is a part of the Bebearia mardania species complex
