= Citric acid =

Weak organic acid

Stereo skeletal formula of citric acid
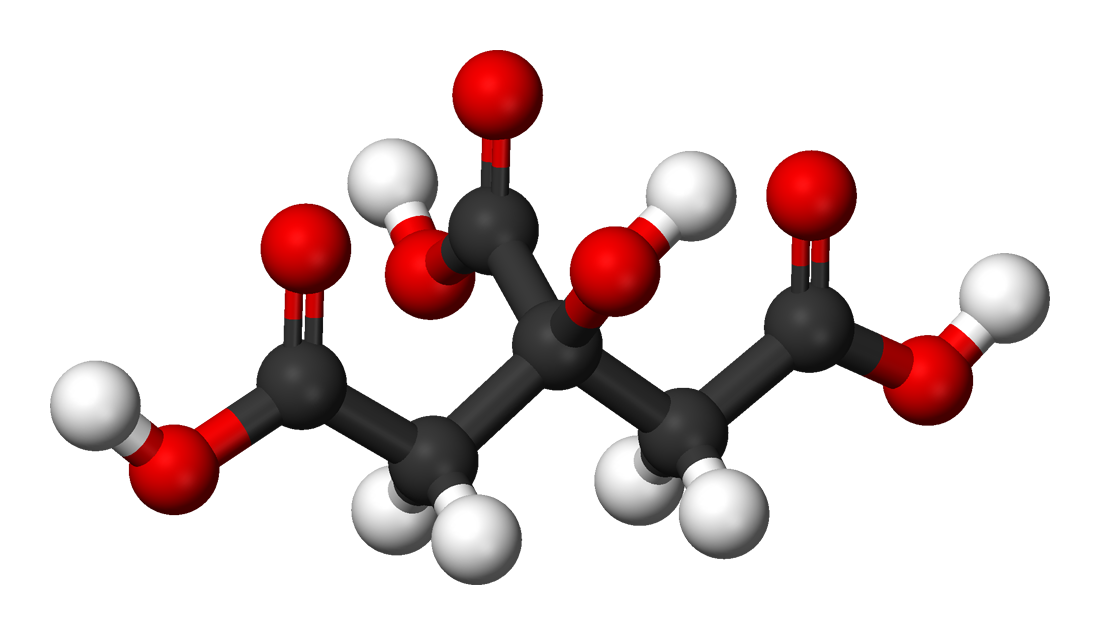
Ball-and-stick model of citric acid
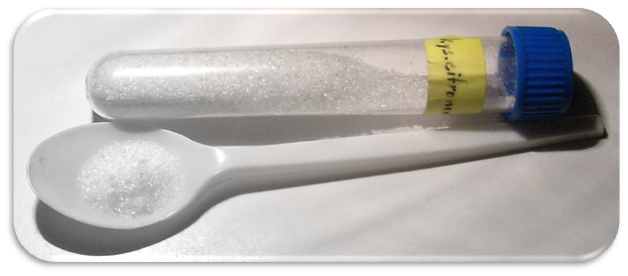
- Crystal sample from the saturated citric acid solution.

Names
- IUPAC name Citric acid
- Preferred IUPAC name 2-Hydroxypropane-1,2,3-tricarboxylic acid

Identifiers
CAS Number	77-92-9
3D model (JSmol)	Interactive image
ChEBI	CHEBI:30769
ChEMBL	ChEMBL1261
ChemSpider	305
DrugBank	DB04272
ECHA InfoCard	100.000.973
EC Number	201-069-1
E number	E330 (antioxidants, ...)
IUPHAR/BPS	2478
KEGG	D00037
PubChem CID	311; 22230 (monohydrate)
RTECS number	GE7350000
UNII	XF417D3PSL
CompTox Dashboard (EPA)	DTXSID3020332
- InChI: InChI=1S/C6H8O7/c7-3(8)1-6(13,5(11)12)2-4(9)10/h13H,1-2H2,(H,7,8)(H,9,10)(H,11,12) Key: KRKNYBCHXYNGOX-UHFFFAOYSA-N; InChI=1/C6H8O7/c7-3(8)1-6(13,5(11)12)2-4(9)10/h13H,1-2H2,(H,7,8)(H,9,10)(H,11,12) Key: KRKNYBCHXYNGOX-UHFFFAOYAM
- SMILES: OC(=O)CC(O)(C(=O)O)CC(=O)O

Properties
Chemical formula	C_{6}H_{8}O_{7}
Molar mass	192.123 g/mol (anhydrous), 210.14 g/mol (monohydrate)
Appearance	white solid
Odor	Odorless
Density	1.665 g/cm^{3} (anhydrous); 1.542 g/cm^{3} (18 °C, monohydrate)
Melting point	156 °C (313 °F; 429 K)
Boiling point	310 °C (590 °F; 583 K) decomposes from 175 °C
Solubility in water	54% w/w (10 °C); 59.2% w/w (20 °C); 64.3% w/w (30 °C); 68.6% w/w (40 °C); 70.9% w/w (50 °C); 73.5% w/w (60 °C); 76.2% w/w (70 °C); 78.8% w/w (80 °C); 81.4% w/w (90 °C); 84% w/w (100 °C)
Solubility	Soluble in acetone, alcohol, ether, ethyl acetate, DMSO; Insoluble in benzene, CHCl_{3}, CS_{2}, toluene
Solubility in ethanol	62 g/100 g (25 °C)
Solubility in amyl acetate	4.41 g/100 g (25 °C)
Solubility in diethyl ether	1.05 g/100 g (25 °C)
Solubility in 1,4-dioxane	35.9 g/100 g (25 °C)
log P	−1.64
Acidity (pK_{a})	pK_{a1} = 3.13 pK_{a2} = 4.76 pK_{a3} = 6.39, 6.40 pK_{a4} = 14.4
Refractive index (n_{D})	1.493–1.509 (20 °C); 1.46 (150 °C)
Viscosity	6.5 cP (50% aq. sol.)

Structure
Crystal structure	Monoclinic

Thermochemistry
Heat capacity (C)	226.51 J/(mol·K) (26.85 °C)
Std molar entropy (S^{⦵}_{298})	252.1 J/(mol·K)
Std enthalpy of formation (Δ_{f}H^{⦵}_{298})	−1543.8 kJ/mol
Heat of combustion, higher value (HHV)	1985.3 kJ/mol (474.5 kcal/mol, 2.47 kcal/g), 1960.6 kJ/mol; 1972.34 kJ/mol (471.4 kcal/mol, 2.24 kcal/g) (monohydrate)

Pharmacology
ATC code	A09AB04 (WHO)

Hazards
- Occupational safety and health (OHS/OSH)
Main hazards	Skin and eye irritant
- GHS labelling
Pictograms	(GHS05: Corrosive) (GHS07: Exclamation mark)
Signal word	Warning
Hazard statements	H290, H319, H315
Precautionary statements	P305+P351+P338
NFPA 704 (fire diamond)	2 1 0
Flash point	155 °C (311 °F; 428 K)
Autoignition temperature	345 °C (653 °F; 618 K)
Explosive limits	8%
- Lethal dose or concentration (LD, LC)
LD_{50} (median dose)	3000 mg/kg (rats, oral)
Safety data sheet (SDS)	HMDB (PDF)
- Except where otherwise noted, data are given for materials in their standard state (at 25 °C [77 °F], 100 kPa). Infobox references

Citric acid is an organic compound with the formula C_{6}H_{8}O_{7}. It is a colorless weak organic acid. It occurs naturally in citrus fruits. In biochemistry, it is an intermediate in the citric acid cycle, which occurs in the metabolism of all aerobic organisms.

More than two million tons of citric acid are manufactured every year. It is used widely as acidifier, flavoring, preservative, and chelating agent.

A citrate is a derivative of citric acid; that is, the salts, esters, and the polyatomic anion found in solutions and salts of citric acid. An example of the former, a salt is trisodium citrate; an ester is triethyl citrate. When citrate trianion is part of a salt, the formula of the citrate trianion is written as C_{6}H_{5}O_{7}^{3–} or C_{3}H_{5}O(COO)_{3}^{3–}.

== Natural occurrence and industrial production ==
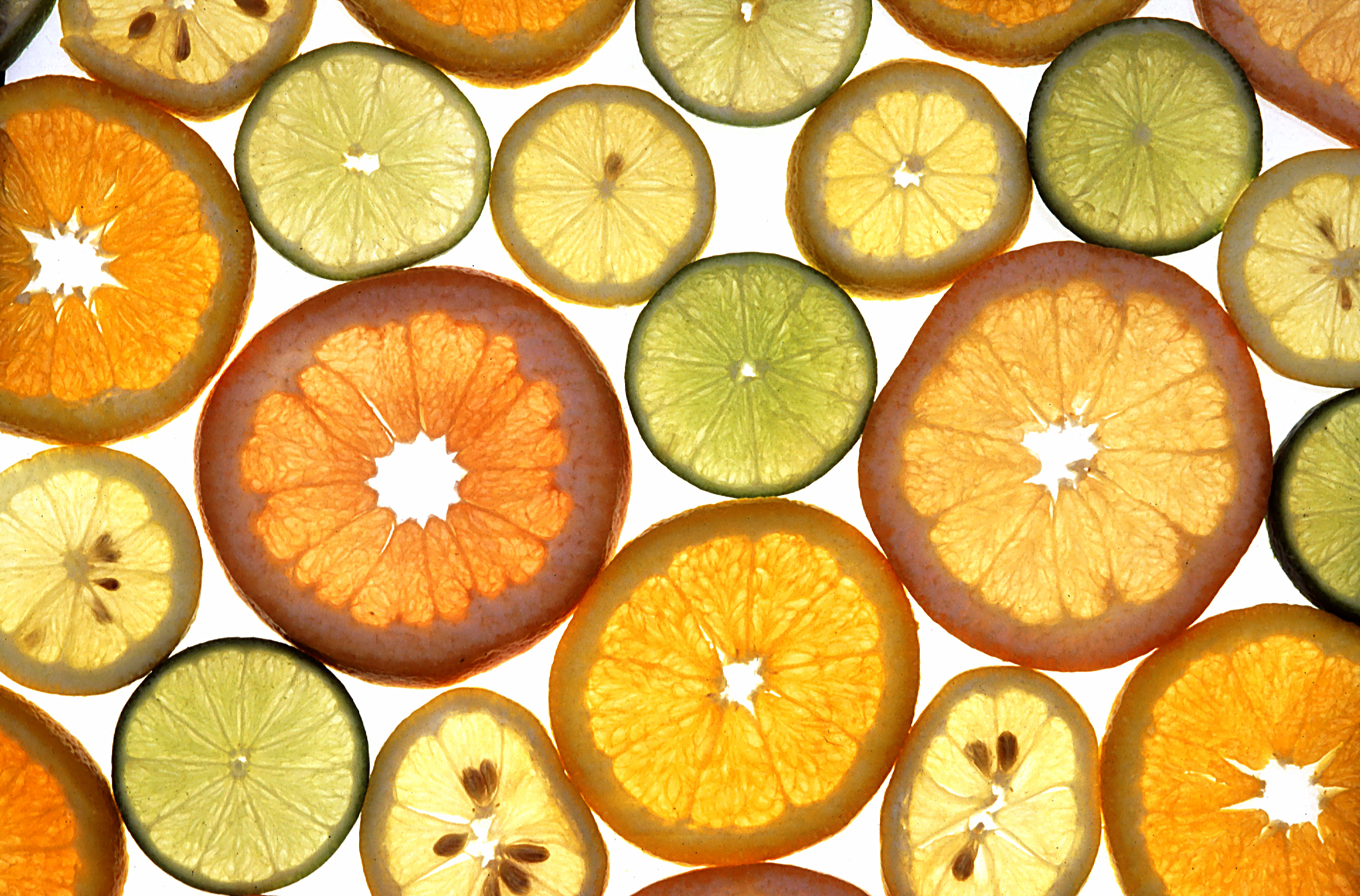
Lemons, oranges, limes, and other citrus fruits contain high concentrations of citric acid.

Citric acid occurs in a variety of fruits and vegetables, most notably citrus fruits. Lemons and limes have particularly high concentrations of the acid; it can constitute as much as 8% of the dry weight of these fruits (about 47 g/L in the juices). (Note: This still does not make the lemon particularly strongly acidic. This is because, as a weak acid, most of the acid molecules are not dissociated so not contributing to acidity inside the lemon or its juice.) The concentrations of citric acid in citrus fruits range from 0.005 mol/L for oranges and grapefruits to 0.30 mol/L in lemons and limes; these values vary within species depending upon the cultivar and the circumstances under which the fruit was grown.

Citric acid was first isolated in 1784 by the chemist Carl Wilhelm Scheele, who crystallized it from lemon juice.

Industrial-scale citric acid production first began in 1890 based on the Italian citrus fruit industry, where the juice was treated with hydrated lime (calcium hydroxide) to precipitate calcium citrate, which was isolated and converted back to the acid using diluted sulfuric acid. In 1893, C. Wehmer discovered Penicillium mold could produce citric acid from sugar. However, microbial production of citric acid did not become industrially important until World War I disrupted Italian Citrus exports.

In 1917, American food chemist James Currie discovered that certain strains of the mold Aspergillus niger could be efficient citric acid producers, and the pharmaceutical company Pfizer began industrial-level production using this technique two years later, followed by Citrique Belge in 1929. In this production technique, which is still the major industrial route to citric acid used today, cultures of Aspergillus niger are fed on a sucrose or glucose-containing medium to produce citric acid. The source of sugar is corn steep liquor, molasses, hydrolyzed corn starch, or other inexpensive, carbohydrate solution. After the mold is filtered out of the resulting suspension, citric acid is isolated by precipitating it with calcium hydroxide to yield calcium citrate salt, from which citric acid is regenerated by treatment with sulfuric acid, as in the direct extraction from citrus fruit juice.

In 1977, a patent was granted to Lever Brothers for the chemical synthesis of citric acid starting either from aconitic or isocitrate (also called alloisocitrate) calcium salts under high pressure conditions; this produced citric acid in near quantitative conversion under what appeared to be a reverse, non-enzymatic Krebs cycle reaction.

Although industrial-scale production of citric acid by chemical synthesis or extraction from citrus fruits are both feasible, fermentation by molds (and sometimes yeasts) is almost exclusively the only method actually practiced.

Global production was in excess of 2,000,000 tons in 2018. More than 50% of this volume was produced in China. More than 50% was used as an acidity regulator in beverages, some 20% in other food applications, 20% for detergent applications, and 10% for applications other than food, such as cosmetics, pharmaceuticals, and in the chemical industry.

== Chemical characteristics ==
Speciation diagram for a 10-millimolar solution of citric acid

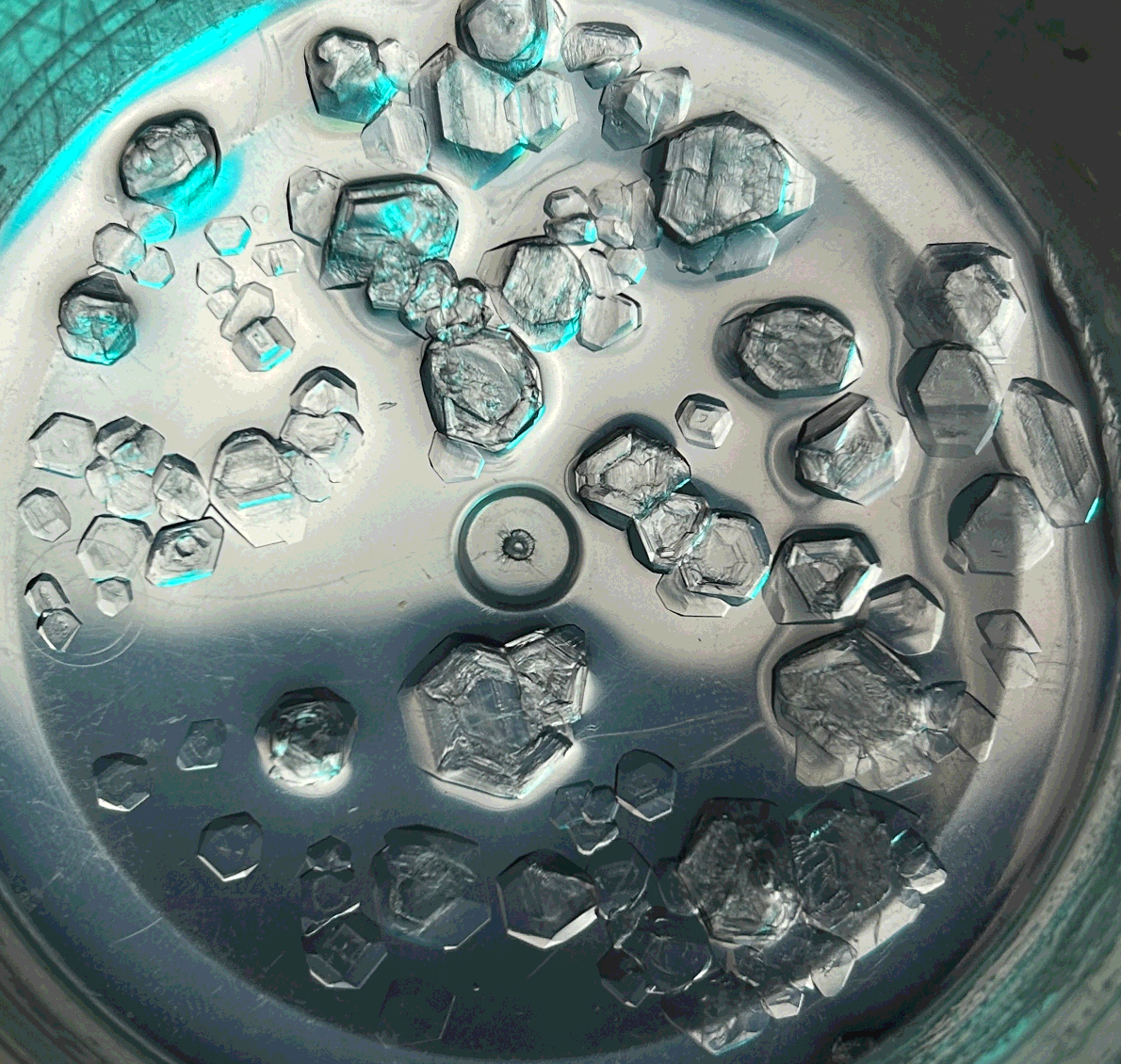
Citric acid monohydrate, crystallized by evaporation from solution at room temperature.

Citric acid is known to occur as a monohydrate, though the anhydrous form can be obtained by crystallization from hot water.

Water can be driven off the monohydrate to produce the anhydrate by heating to around 80 °C, though this can also occur at ambient temperatures slowly over time by efflorescence at humidities in range of ~50% or less.

Citric acid dissolves in absolute (anhydrous) ethanol (76 parts of citric acid per 100 parts of ethanol) at 15 °C. It decomposes with loss of carbon dioxide above about 175 °C.

Citric acid is a triprotic acid, with pK_{a} values, extrapolated to zero ionic strength, of 3.128, 4.761, and 6.396 at 25 °C. The pK_{a} of the hydroxyl group has been found, by means of ^{13}C NMR spectroscopy, to be 14.4. The speciation diagram shows that solutions of citric acid are buffer solutions between about pH 2 and pH 8. In biological systems around pH 7, the two species present are the citrate ion and mono-hydrogen citrate ion. The SSC 20X hybridization buffer is an example in common use. Tables compiled for biochemical studies are available.

Conversely, the pH of a 1 mM solution of citric acid will be about 3.2. The pH of fruit juices from citrus fruits like oranges and lemons depends on the citric acid concentration, with a higher concentration of citric acid resulting in a lower pH.

Acid salts of citric acid can be prepared by careful adjustment of the pH before crystallizing the compound. See, for example, sodium citrate.

The citrate ion forms complexes with metallic cations. The stability constants for the formation of these complexes are quite large because of the chelate effect. Consequently, it forms complexes even with alkali metal cations. However, when a chelate complex is formed using all three carboxylate groups, the chelate rings have 7 and 8 members, which are generally less stable thermodynamically than smaller chelate rings. In consequence, the hydroxyl group can be deprotonated, forming part of a more stable 5-membered ring, as in ammonium ferric citrate, [NH^{+}_{4}]_{5}Fe^{3+}(C_{6}H_{4}O^{4−}_{7})_{2}·2H_{2}O.

Citric acid can be esterified at one or more of its three carboxylic acid groups to form any of a variety of mono-, di-, tri-, and mixed esters.

== Biochemistry ==
=== Citric acid cycle ===
Citrate is an intermediate in the citric acid cycle, also known as the tricarboxylic acid (TCA) cycle or the Krebs cycle, a central metabolic pathway for animals, plants, and bacteria. In the Krebs cycle, citrate synthase catalyzes the condensation of oxaloacetate with acetyl CoA to form citrate. Citrate then acts as the substrate for aconitase and is converted into aconitic acid. The cycle ends with regeneration of oxaloacetate. This series of chemical reactions is the source of two-thirds of the food-derived energy in higher organisms. The chemical energy released is available under the form of Adenosine triphosphate (ATP). Hans Adolf Krebs received the 1953 Nobel Prize in Physiology or Medicine for the discovery.

=== Other biological roles ===
Citrate can be transported out of the mitochondria and into the cytoplasm, then broken down into acetyl-CoA for fatty acid synthesis, and into oxaloacetate. Citrate is a positive modulator of this conversion, and allosterically regulates the enzyme acetyl-CoA carboxylase, which is the regulating enzyme in the conversion of acetyl-CoA into malonyl-CoA (the commitment step in fatty acid synthesis). In short, citrate is transported into the cytoplasm, converted into acetyl-CoA, which is then converted into malonyl-CoA by acetyl-CoA carboxylase, which is allosterically modulated by citrate.

High concentrations of cytosolic citrate can inhibit phosphofructokinase, the catalyst of a rate-limiting step of glycolysis. This effect is advantageous: high concentrations of citrate indicate that there is a large supply of biosynthetic precursor molecules, so there is no need for phosphofructokinase to continue to send molecules of its substrate, fructose 6-phosphate, into glycolysis. Citrate acts by augmenting the inhibitory effect of high concentrations of ATP, another sign that there is no need to carry out glycolysis.

Citrate is a vital component of bone, helping to regulate the size of apatite crystals.

== Applications ==
=== Food and drink ===
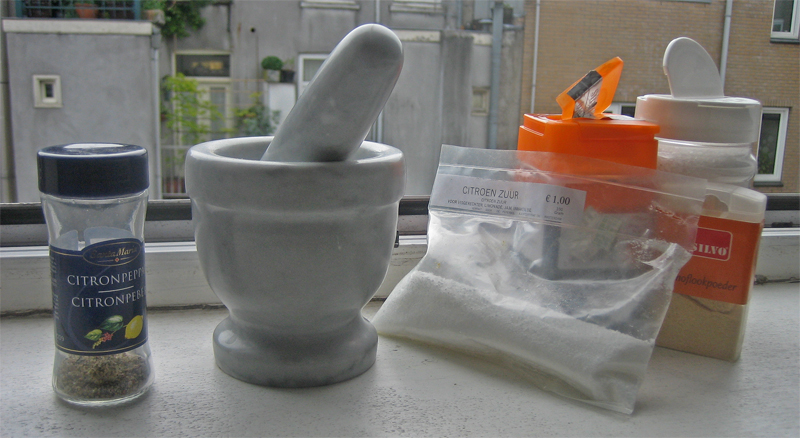
Powdered citric acid being used to prepare lemon pepper seasoning

Because it is one of the stronger edible acids, the dominant use of citric acid is as a flavoring and preservative in food and beverages, especially soft drinks and candies. Within the European Union it is denoted by E number E330. Citrate salts of various metals are used to deliver those minerals in a biologically available form in many dietary supplements. Citric acid has 247 kcal per 100 g. In the United States the purity requirements for citric acid as a food additive are defined by the Food Chemicals Codex, which is published by the United States Pharmacopoeia (USP).

Citric acid can be added to ice cream as an emulsifying agent to keep fats from separating, to caramel to prevent sucrose crystallization, or in recipes in place of fresh lemon juice. Citric acid is used with sodium bicarbonate in a wide range of effervescent formulae, both for ingestion (e.g., powders and tablets) and for personal care (e.g., bath salts, bath bombs, and cleaning of grease). Citric acid sold in a dry powdered form is commonly sold in markets and groceries as "sour salt", due to its physical resemblance to table salt. It has use in culinary applications, as an alternative to vinegar or lemon juice, where a pure acid is needed. Citric acid can be used in food coloring to balance the pH level of a normally basic dye.

=== Cleaning and chelating agent ===
Structure of an iron(III) citrate complex

Citric acid is an excellent chelating agent, making metals soluble by binding to them. It is used to remove and discourage the buildup of limescale from boilers and evaporators. It can be used to treat water, which makes it useful in improving the effectiveness of soaps and laundry detergents. By chelating the metals in hard water, it lets these cleaners produce foam and work better without need for water softening. Citric acid is the active ingredient in some bathroom and kitchen cleaning solutions. A solution with a six percent concentration of citric acid will remove hard water stains from glass without scrubbing. Citric acid can be used in shampoo to wash out wax and coloring from the hair. Illustrative of its chelating abilities, citric acid was the first successful eluant used for total ion-exchange separation of the lanthanides, during the Manhattan Project in the 1940s. In the 1950s, it was replaced by the far more efficient EDTA.

In industry, it is used to dissolve rust from steel, and to passivate stainless steels.

=== Cosmetics, pharmaceuticals, dietary supplements, and foods ===
Citric acid is used as an acidulant in creams, gels, and liquids. Used in foods and dietary supplements, it may be classified as a processing aid if it was added for a technical or functional effect (e.g. acidulent, chelator, viscosifier, etc.). If it is still present in insignificant amounts, and the technical or functional effect is no longer present, it may be exempt from labeling <21 CFR §101.100(c)>.

Citric acid is an alpha hydroxy acid and is an active ingredient in chemical skin peels.

Citric acid is commonly used as a buffer to increase the solubility of brown heroin.

Citric acid is used as one of the active ingredients in the production of facial tissues with antiviral properties.

=== Other uses ===
The buffering properties of citrates are used to control pH in household cleaners and pharmaceuticals.

Citric acid is used as an odorless alternative to white vinegar for fabric dyeing with acid dyes. It can enhance the mordanting process, crosslinking fabrics and dyes through an esterification reaction.

Sodium citrate is a component of Benedict's reagent, used for both qualitative and quantitative identification of reducing sugars.

Citric acid can be used as an alternative to nitric acid in passivation of stainless steel.

Citric acid can be used as a lower-odor stop bath as part of the process for developing photographic film. Photographic developers are alkaline, so a mild acid is used to neutralize and stop their action quickly, but commonly used acetic acid leaves a strong vinegar odor in the darkroom.

Citric acid is an excellent soldering flux, either dry or as a concentrated solution in water. It should be removed after soldering, especially with fine wires, as it is mildly corrosive. It dissolves and rinses quickly in hot water.

Alkali citrate can be used as an inhibitor of kidney stones by increasing urine citrate levels, useful for prevention of calcium stones, and increasing urine pH, useful for preventing uric acid and cystine stones.

== Synthesis of other organic compounds ==
Citric acid is a versatile precursor to many other organic compounds. Dehydration routes give itaconic acid and its anhydride. Citraconic acid can be produced via thermal isomerization of itaconic acid anhydride. The required itaconic acid anhydride is obtained by dry distillation of citric acid. Aconitic acid can be synthesized by dehydration of citric acid using sulfuric acid:

(HO_{2}CCH_{2})_{2}C(OH)CO_{2}H → HO_{2}CCH=C(CO_{2}H)CH_{2}CO_{2}H + H_{2}O

Acetonedicarboxylic acid can also be prepared by decarboxylation of citric acid in fuming sulfuric acid.

== Safety ==
Although a weak acid, exposure to pure citric acid can cause adverse effects. Inhalation may cause cough, shortness of breath, or sore throat. Over-ingestion may cause abdominal pain and sore throat. Exposure of concentrated solutions to skin and eyes can cause redness and pain. Long-term or repeated consumption may cause erosion of tooth enamel.

== Compendial status ==
- British Pharmacopoeia
- Japanese Pharmacopoeia

== See also ==
- Closely related acids:
  - isocitric acid
  - aconitic acid
  - fluorocitric acid
  - chlorocitric acid
  - propane-1,2,3-tricarboxylic acid (tricarballylic acid, carballylic acid)
- Acids in wine
