= Fluorocitric acid =

Names
- IUPAC name 3-C-Carboxy-2,4-dideoxy-2-fluoropentaric acid
- Other names 2-Fluorocitric acid; 2-Fluorocitrate; 1-Fluoro-2-hydroxypropane-1,2,3-tricarboxylic acid

Identifiers
CAS Number	357-89-1
3D model (JSmol)	Interactive image
ChemSpider	96829
PubChem CID	107647
CompTox Dashboard (EPA)	DTXSID80957104
- InChI: InChI=1S/C6H7FO7/c7-3(4(10)11)6(14,5(12)13)1-2(8)9/h3,14H,1H2,(H,8,9)(H,10,11)(H,12,13) Key: DGXLYHAWEBCTRU-UHFFFAOYSA-N; InChI=1/C6H7FO7/c7-3(4(10)11)6(14,5(12)13)1-2(8)9/h3,14H,1H2,(H,8,9)(H,10,11)(H,12,13) Key: DGXLYHAWEBCTRU-UHFFFAOYAE
- SMILES: O=C(O)C(O)(CC(=O)O)C(F)C(=O)O

Properties
Chemical formula	HOC(CO_{2}H)(CH_{2}CO_{2}H)(CHFCO_{2}H)
Molar mass	210.113 g·mol^{−1}
Appearance	Odorless, white crystals
Density	1.37 g/cm^{3}
Melting point	35.2 °C (95.4 °F; 308.3 K)
Boiling point	165 °C (329 °F; 438 K)
Solubility in water	Soluble

Hazards
- Occupational safety and health (OHS/OSH)
Main hazards	
- Except where otherwise noted, data are given for materials in their standard state (at 25 °C [77 °F], 100 kPa). verify (what is ?) Infobox references

Fluorocitric acid is an organic compound with the chemical formula HOC(CO_{2}H)(CH_{2}CO_{2}H)(CHFCO_{2}H). It is a fluorinated carboxylic acid derived from citric acid by substitution of one methylene hydrogen by a fluorine atom. The appropriate anion is called fluorocitrate. Fluorocitrate is formed in two steps from fluoroacetate. Fluoroacetate is first converted to fluoroacetyl-CoA by acetyl-CoA synthetase in the mitochondria. Then fluoroacetyl-CoA condenses with oxaloacetate to form fluorocitrate. This step is catalyzed by citrate synthase. Fluorocitrate is a metabolite of fluoroacetic acid and is very toxic because it is not processable using aconitase in the citrate cycle (where fluorocitrate takes place of citrate as the substrate). The enzyme is inhibited and the cycle stops working.

== See also ==
- Chlorocitric acid
- Citric acid
- Citrate cycle
- Fluoroacetic acid
- Fluorooleic acid
- Isocitric acid
