= EPA list of extremely hazardous substances =

This is the list of extremely hazardous substances defined in Section 302 of the U.S. Emergency Planning and Community Right-to-Know Act (42 U.S.C. § 11002). The list can be found as an appendix to 40 CFR 355. Updates as of 2006 can be seen on the Federal Register, 71 FR 47121 (August 16, 2006).

The data were provided by the United States Environmental Protection Agency (EPA).

== A ==
- Acetone cyanohydrin
- Acetone thiosemicarbazide
- Acrolein
- Acrylamide
- Acrylonitrile
- Acryloyl chloride
- Adiponitrile
- Aldicarb
- Aldrin
- Allyl alcohol
- Allylamine
- Aluminium phosphide
- Aminopterin
- Amiton
- Amiton oxalate
- Ammonia
- Amphetamine
- Aniline
- Aniline, 2,4,6-trimethyl-
- Antimony pentafluoride
- Antimycin A
- ANTU (Alpha-Naphthylthiourea)
- Arsenic pentoxide
- Arsenous oxide
- Arsenous trichloride
- Arsine
- Azinphos-ethyl
- Azinphos-methyl

== B ==
- Benzal chloride
- Benzenamine, 3-(trifluoromethyl)-
- Benzenearsonic acid
- Benzimidazole, 4,5-dichloro-2-(trifluoromethyl)-
- Benzotrichloride
- Benzyl chloride
- Benzyl cyanide
- Bicyclo(2.2.1)heptane-2-carbonitrile
- Bis(chloromethyl) ketone
- Bitoscanate
- Boron trichloride
- Boron trifluoride
- Boron trifluoride compound with dimethyl ether (1:1)
- Bromadiolone
- Bromine

== C ==
- Cadmium oxide
- Cadmium stearate
- Calcium arsenate
- Camphechlor
- Cantharidin
- Carbachol chloride
- Carbamic acid, Methyl-, O-(((2,4-Dimethyl-1,3-Dithiolan-2-yl)Methylene)Amino)- (Tirpate)
- Carbofuran
- Carbon disulfide
- Carbophenothion
- Chlordane
- Chlorfenvinfos
- Chlorine
- Chlormephos
- Chlormequat chloride
- Chloroacetic acid
- 2-chloroethanol
- Chloroethyl chloroformate
- Chloroform
- Chloromethyl ether
- Chloromethyl methyl ether
- Chlorophacinone
- Chloroxuron
- Chlorthiophos
- Chromic chloride
- Cobalt carbonyl
- Colchicine
- Coumaphos
- Cresol, -o
- Crimidine
- Crotonaldehyde
- Crotonaldehyde, (E)-
- Cyanogen bromide
- Cyanogen iodide
- Cyanophos
- Cyanuric fluoride
- Cycloheximide
- Cyclohexylamine

== D ==
- Decaborane(14)
- Demeton
- Demeton-S-methyl
- Dialifor
- Diborane
- Dichloroethyl ether
- Dichloromethylphenylsilane
- Dichlorvos
- Dicrotophos
- Diepoxybutane
- Diethyl chlorophosphate
- Digitoxin
- Diglycidyl ether
- Digoxin
- Dimefox
- Dimethoate
- Dimethyl phosphorochloridothioate
- Dimethyl-p-phenylenediamine
- Dimethyldichlorosilane
- Dimethylhydrazine
- Dimetilan
- Dinitrocresol
- 2,4-Dinitrophenol
- Dinoseb
- Dinoterb
- Dioxathion
- Diphacinone
- Disulfoton
- Dithiazanine iodide
- Dithiobiuret

== E ==
- Endosulfan
- Endothion
- Endrin
- Epichlorohydrin
- EPN, or O-Ethyl-O-(4-nitrophenyl)phenylthiophosphonate
- Ergocalciferol
- Ergotamine tartrate
- Ethanesulfonyl chloride, 2-chloro-
- Ethanol, 1,2-dichloro-, acetate
- Ethion
- Ethoprophos
- Ethylbis(2-chloroethyl)amine
- Ethylene fluorohydrin
- Ethylene oxide
- Ethylenediamine
- Ethyleneimine
- Ethylthiocyanate

== F ==
- Fenamiphos
- Fenitrothion
- Fensulfothion
- Fluenetil
- Fluomine
- Fluorine
- Fluoroacetamide
- Fluoroacetic acid
- Fluoroacetyl chloride
- Fluorouracil
- Fonofos
- Formaldehyde
- Formaldehyde cyanohydrin
- Formetanate hydrochloride
- Formothion
- Formparanate
- Fosthietan
- Fuberidazole
- Furan

== G ==
- Gallium trichloride

== H ==
- Hexachlorocyclopentadiene
- Hexamethylenediamine, N,N'-dibutyl-
- Hydrazine
- Hydrocyanic acid
- Hydrogen chloride (gas only)
- Hydrogen fluoride
- Hydrogen peroxide (conc > 52%)
- Hydrogen selenide
- Hydrogen sulfide
- Hydroquinone

== I ==
- Iron pentacarbonyl
- Isobenzan
- Isocyanic acid, 3,4-dichlorophenyl ester
- Isodrin
- Isophorone diisocyanate
- Isopropylmethylpyrazolyl dimethylcarbamate

== L ==
- Lactonitrile
- Leptophos
- Lewisite
- Lindane
- Lithium hydride

== M ==
- Malononitrile
- Manganese, tricarbonyl methylcyclopentadienyl
- Mechlorethamine
- Mercuric acetate
- Mercuric chloride
- Mercuric oxide
- Methacrolein diacetate
- Methacrylic anhydride
- Methacrylonitrile
- Methacryloyl chloride
- Methacryloyloxyethyl isocyanate
- Methamidophos
- Methanesulfonyl fluoride
- Methidathion
- Methiocarb
- Methomyl
- Methoxyethylmercuric acetate
- Methyl 2-chloroacrylate
- Methyl bromide
- Methyl chloroformate
- Methyl hydrazine
- Methyl isocyanate
- Methyl isothiocyanate
- Methyl phenkapton
- Methyl phosphonic dichloride
- Methyl thiocyanate
- Methyl vinyl ketone
- Methylmercuric dicyanamide
- Methyltrichlorosilane
- Metolcarb
- Mevinphos
- Mexacarbate
- Mitomycin C
- Monocrotophos
- Muscimol
- Mustard gas

== N ==
- Nickel carbonyl
- Nicotine
- Nicotine sulfate
- Nitric oxide
- Nitrobenzene
- Nitrocyclohexane
- Nitrogen dioxide
- N-Nitrosodimethylamine
- Norbormide

== O ==
- Organorhodium complex
- Ouabain
- Oxamyl
- Oxetane, 3,3-bis(chloromethyl)-
- Oxydisulfoton

== P ==
- Paraquat
- Paraquat methosulfate
- Parathion
- Parathion-methyl
- Paris green
- Pentaborane
- Pentadecylamine
- Peracetic acid
- Perchloromethylmercaptan
- Phenol
- Phenol, 2,2'-thiobis(4-chloro-6-methyl)-
- Phenol, 3-(1-methylethyl)-, methylcarbamate
- Phenoxarsine, 10,10'-oxydi-
- Phenyl dichloroarsine
- Phenylhydrazine hydrochloride
- Phenylmercury acetate
- Phenylsilatrane
- Phenylthiourea
- Phosacetim
- Phosfolan
- Phosgene
- Phosmet
- Phosphamidon
- Phosphine
- Phosphonothioic acid, methyl-, O-ethyl O-(4-(methylthio)phenyl) ester
- Phosphonothioic acid, methyl-, S-(2-(bis(1-methylethyl)amino)ethyl) O-ethyl ester
- Phosphonothioic acid, methyl-, O-(4-nitrophenyl) O-phenyl ester
- Phosphoric acid, dimethyl 4-(methylthio)phenyl ester
- Phosphonothioic acid, O,O-dimethyl-S-(2-methylthio) ethyl ester
- Phosphorus
- Phosphorus oxychloride
- Phosphorus pentachloride
- Phosphorus trichloride
- Physostigmine
- Physostigmine, salicylate (1:1)
- Picrotoxin
- Piperidine
- Pirimifos-ethyl
- Plutonium
- Polonium-210
- Potassium arsenite
- Potassium cyanide
- Potassium silver cyanide
- Promecarb
- Propargyl bromide
- Propionitrile
- Propionitrile, 3-chloro-
- Propiophenone, 4'-amino-
- Propyleneimine
- Prothoate
- Pyrene
- Pyridine, 4-amino-
- Pyridine, 4-nitro-, 1-oxide
- Pyriminil

== R ==
- Ricin

== S ==
- Salcomine
- Sarin
- Selenious acid
- Semicarbazide hydrochloride
- Silane, (4-aminobutyl)diethoxymethyl-
- Sodium arsenate
- Sodium azide
- Sodium cacodylate
- Sodium cyanide
- Sodium fluoroacetate
- Sodium pentachlorophenate
- Sodium selenate
- Sodium selenite
- Stannane, acetoxytriphenyl-
- Strychnine
- Strychnine sulfate
- Sulfotep
- Sulfoxide, 3-chloropropyl octyl
- Sulfur dioxide
- Sulfur tetrafluoride
- Sulfur trioxide
- Sulfuric acid

== T ==
- Tabun
- Tellurium
- Tellurium hexafluoride
- TEPP
- Terbufos
- Tetraethyllead
- Tetraethyltin
- Tetranitromethane
- Thallium sulfate
- Thallous carbonate
- Thallous chloride
- Thallous malonate
- Thallous sulfate
- Thiocarbazide
- Thiofanox
- Thionazin
- Thiophenol
- Thiosemicarbazide
- Thiourea, (2-chlorophenyl)-
- Thiourea, (2-methylphenyl)-
- Titanium tetrachloride
- Toluene 2,4-diisocyanate
- Toluene 2,6-diisocyanate
- Trans-1,4-dichlorobutene
- Triamiphos
- Triazofos
- Trichloro(chloromethyl)silane
- Trichloro(dichlorophenyl)silane
- Trichloroacetyl chloride
- Trichloroethylsilane
- Trichloronate
- Trichlorophenylsilane
- Triethoxysilane
- Trimethylchlorosilane
- Trimethylolpropane phosphite
- Trimethyltin chloride
- Triphenyltin chloride
- Tris(2-chloroethyl)amine

== V ==
- Valinomycin
- Vinyl acetate monomer

== W ==
- Warfarin
- Warfarin sodium

== X ==
- Xylylene dichloride

== Z ==
- Zinc phosphide

== See also ==
- List of highly toxic gases
