= C8H12O4 =

The molecular formula C_{8}H_{12}O_{4} (molar mass: 172.178 g/mol) may refer to:

- Diethyl maleate
- 1,6-Dioxecane-2,7-dione
- Methacrolein diacetate
- 1,4-Cyclohexanedicarboxylic acid
