= Toxic syndrome =

Toxic syndrome may refer to:

- Toxidrome, a syndrome caused by a dangerous level of toxins in the body
- Toxic shock syndrome (TSS), a condition caused by bacterial toxins
