= C6H11NO2 =

The molecular formula C_{6}H_{11}NO_{2} may refer to:

- 4-Acetamidobutanal
- Cyclohexyl nitrite, an organic nitrite
- Cycloleucine, an unnatural amino acid
- Isonipecotic acid, a GABAA receptor partial agonist
- Nipecotic acid, a GABA uptake inhibitor
- Nitrocyclohexane, a nitro compound
- Pipecolic acid, a small organic molecule which accumulates in pipecolic acidemia
- Vigabatrin, an antiepileptic drug
