= Cyanophos =

Names
- Preferred IUPAC name O-(4-Cyanophenyl) O,O-dimethyl phosphorothioate

Identifiers
CAS Number	2636-26-2
3D model (JSmol)	Interactive image
Beilstein Reference	2695901
ChEBI	CHEBI:38621
ChEMBL	ChEMBL2271089
ChemSpider	16569
ECHA InfoCard	100.018.301
EC Number	220-130-3
KEGG	C18397
PubChem CID	17522
UNII	2AB0Z99OXP
UN number	3018
CompTox Dashboard (EPA)	DTXSID0041806
- InChI: InChI=1S/C9H10NO3PS/c1-11-14(15,12-2)13-9-5-3-8(7-10)4-6-9/h3-6H,1-2H3 Key: SCKHCCSZFPSHGR-UHFFFAOYSA-N; InChI=1/C9H10NO3PS/c1-11-14(15,12-2)13-9-5-3-8(7-10)4-6-9/h3-6H,1-2H3 Key: SCKHCCSZFPSHGR-UHFFFAOYAF
- SMILES: COP(=S)(OC)OC1=CC=C(C=C1)C#N

Properties
Chemical formula	C_{9}H_{10}NO_{3}PS
Molar mass	243.22 g·mol^{−1}
Appearance	Yellow to reddish-yellow transparent liquid
Density	0.932 g/cm^{3}
Melting point	14 to 15 °C; 57 to 59 °F; 287 to 288 K
Boiling point	119 to 120 °C; 246 to 248 °F; 392 to 393 K at 0.09 mmHg

Hazards
- GHS labelling
Pictograms	(GHS06: Toxic) (GHS07: Exclamation mark) (GHS08: Health hazard) (GHS09: Environmental hazard)
Signal word	Danger
Hazard statements	H302, H311, H361, H370, H372, H400
Precautionary statements	P201, P202, P260, P264, P270, P273, P280, P281, P301+P312, P302+P352, P307+P311, P308+P313, P312, P314, P321, P322, P330, P361, P363, P391, P405, P501
NFPA 704 (fire diamond)	2 1 1
- Safety data sheet (SDS)
- Except where otherwise noted, data are given for materials in their standard state (at 25 °C [77 °F], 100 kPa). verify (what is ?) Infobox references

Cyanophos is a cholinesterase inhibitor used as an insecticide and avicide; for example, against rice stem borers and house flies. It is part of the chemical class of organophosphorus compounds, and is a yellow to reddish-yellow transparent liquid.

== Safety ==
Cyanophos can enter the body via inhalation, ingestion, and contact with the skin and eyes. Symptoms of cyanophos poisoning resemble those of the chemical weapon sarin and include dyspnea, vomiting, diarrhea, abdominal pain, bronchorrhea, blurred vision, and opsoclonus.

It is classified as an extremely hazardous substance in the United States as defined in Section 302 of the U.S. Emergency Planning and Community Right-to-Know Act (42 U.S.C. 11002), and is subject to strict reporting requirements by facilities which produce, store, or use it in significant quantities.

== Synonyms ==
- BAY 34727
- Bayer 34727
- Ciafos
- Cyanofos
- Cyanox
- Cyap
- ENT 25,675
- O,O-dimethyl O-(4-cyanophenyl) phosphorothioate
- O,O-dimethyl O-(p-cyanophenyl) phosphorothioate
- O,O-dimethyl O-4-cyanophenyl phosphorothioate
- O,O-dimethyl O-4-cyanophenyl thiophosphate
- O,O-dimethyl-O-p-cyanophenyl phosphorothioate
- O-p-cyanophenyl O,O-dimethyl phosphorothioate
- Phosphorothioic acid O-(4-cyanophenyl) O,O-dimethyl ester
- Phosphorothioic acid, O,O-dimethyl ester, O-ester with p-hydroxybenzonitrile
- Phosphorothioic acid, O-p-cyanophenyl O,O-dimethyl ester
- S 4084
- Sumitomo S 4084
