= Felbinac =

Topical NSAID medication

Clinical data
- AHFS/Drugs.com: International Drug Names
- Routes of administration: Topical
- ATC code: M02AA08 (WHO)

Legal status
- Legal status: UK: P (Pharmacy medicines)

Identifiers
- IUPAC name: biphenyl-4-ylacetic acid
- CAS Number: 5728-52-9
- PubChem CID: 3332
- DrugBank: DB07477
- ChemSpider: 3215
- UNII: 94WNJ5U8L7
- KEGG: D01675
- ChEBI: CHEBI:31597
- ChEMBL: ChEMBL413965
- CompTox Dashboard (EPA): DTXSID0045389
- ECHA InfoCard: 100.024.758

Chemical and physical data
- Formula: C_{14}H_{12}O_{2}
- Molar mass: 212.248 g·mol^{−1}
- 3D model (JSmol): Interactive image
- SMILES: O=C(O)Cc1ccc(cc1)c2ccccc2
- InChI: InChI=1S/C14H12O2/c15-14(16)10-11-6-8-13(9-7-11)12-4-2-1-3-5-12/h1-9H,10H2,(H,15,16); Key:QRZAKQDHEVVFRX-UHFFFAOYSA-N

Felbinac (INN, or biphenylylacetic acid) is a topical medicine, belonging to the family of medicines known as nonsteroidal anti-inflammatory drugs (NSAIDs) of the arylacetic acid (not arylpropionic acid) class, which is used to treat muscle inflammation and arthritis. It is an active metabolite of fenbufen.

== Related compounds ==
The α-methyl acid of felbinac is called biprofen and is used to prepare bifepramide. The α-ethyl acid is called xenbucin which is used to make xenthiorate.

== See also ==
- Fluenetil
