= Khimprom Novocheboksarsk =

- Company type: Public Joint Stock Company
- Traded as: MCX: HIMC, MCX: HIMCP
- Industry: Chemical
- Founded: 1960
- Headquarters: Novocheboksarsk, Russia
- Revenue: ▼761,000,000 rubles (~$50 billions USD, 2021) (Note: June 2022 prices)
- Operating income: 3,891,282,000 Russian ruble (2023)
- Net income: 2,900,750,000 Russian ruble (2023)
- Total assets: 17,909,078,000 Russian ruble (2023)
- Number of employees: 3,326 (2023)
- Parent: Orgsintez Group (Renova)
- Website: www.himprom.com

Khimprom Novocheboksarsk (Russian: ПАО «Химпром») is a chemicals-producing company based in Novocheboksarsk, Russia. It is part of Orgsintez Group (Renova).

The Novocheboksarsk Khimprom Production Association is a giant facility whose Production Facility No. 3 manufactured chemical agents between 1972 and 1987. The plant is now making preparations to destroy chemical weapons and agents while continuing to produce household chemicals and fertilizers.

The company used to manufacture organophosphorus nerve agents, and as of 2013 still produced dual-use chemicals. It produced Soviet V-gas until 1987, and still manufactures phosphorus oxychloride, phosphorus trichloride, and dimethyl phosphite, and phosphorus-based insecticides, herbicides and dyestuffs.

== Products ==
As of June 2022 the company has listed the following chemical compounds that it's been producing at the time:

- Antioxidant С-789 (for rubber industry)
- Acetonanil H (2,2,4-Trimethyl-1,2-dihydroquinoline)
- Benzamine N, (epoxy curing agent)
- Bifurgin (Russian: Бифургин)
- Hydrogen peroxide
- Sodium hydrosulfide
- Calcium hypochlorite
- Sodium hypochlorite
- Diphenylguanidine (vulcanizing agent in rubber industry)
- Hydrophobicity-inducing liquids (probably Bis(trimethylsilyl)amine)
- Calcium hydroxide (CaOH)
- Calcium chloride (CaCl, liquid)
- 2-Ethylhexanoic acid
- Hydrogen chloride (HCl)
- Organic silica gels (used in oil drilling industry to secure borehole stability)
- Silicon tetrachloride:
- Organic silica varnishes
- Dichloromethane
- Sodium hydroxide (NaOH)
- Polyethylene glycol ethers
- Chlorinated paraffins
- Polyamine
- Additives for mineral oils
- Organic silica risings
- Poly(methylphenylsiloxane)-based resins at different dilution levels
- Isopropyl alcohol
- Isopropyl alcohol-based antiseptics in mixtures with paraffins (75%/25%)
- Tetraethyl orthosilicate
- Trichlorosilane
- Carbon tetrachloride
- Trichlorophenylsilane
- Liquid chlorine (Cl)
- Chlorobenzene
- Chloroform
- Silica-based enamels

=== Flotation agents ===
A range of chemical flotation agents for froth flotation processes: (Note: Exact compounds names may be slightly different)

- Dibutyl dithiophosphate
- Disobutyl dithiophosphate
- Sodium dithiophosphate etc.

== Management ==
- General Managing Director - Kolchin Dmitry Vladimirovich
- First Deputy General Director - Kolesnikova Elena Vladimirovna
- Commercial Director - Fedotov Alexey Viktorovich
- Director of Legal Affairs - Vinogradova Lada Evgenievna
- Director of Security - Yakovlev Oleg Nikolaevich
- Chief Engineer - Gorin Vadim Konstantinovich
- Director of Human Resources Management - Rogozin Elena Valeryevna
- Director of Production - Kurmanov Viktor Ivanovich
- Director of the Research Center - Efimov Yuri Timofeevich
