= ATSC (disambiguation) =

ATSC is the Advanced Television Systems Committee standards.

ATSC may also refer to:

- Advanced Television Systems Committee, the committee that wrote the ATSC Standards
- ATSC 3.0, a major version of the ATSC standards
- Acetone thiosemicarbazone, a chemical compound
- Air Technical Service Command, one of the many predecessors of the Air Force Materiel Command
- Army Training Support Center, a United States Army facility at Fort Eustis
- ATSC (UK) Ltd, the manufacturer of the fake ADE 651 bomb detection device
