= C8H10N2S =

The molecular formula C_{8}H_{10}N_{2}S (molar mass: 166.24 g/mol, exact mass: 166.0565 u) may refer to:

- Ethionamide
- o-Tolylthiourea
