= Crimidine =

Names
- Preferred IUPAC name 2-Chloro-N,N,6-trimethylpyrimidin-4-amine

Identifiers
CAS Number	535-89-7
3D model (JSmol)	Interactive image
ChemSpider	10356
ECHA InfoCard	100.007.840
KEGG	C19138
PubChem CID	10813
UNII	W34R2923T3
CompTox Dashboard (EPA)	DTXSID0041800
- InChI: InChI=1S/C7H10ClN3/c1-5-4-6(11(2)3)10-7(8)9-5/h4H,1-3H3 Key: HJIUPFPIEBPYIE-UHFFFAOYSA-N
- SMILES: Cc1cc(N(C)C)nc(Cl)n1

Properties
Chemical formula	C_{7}H_{10}ClN_{3}
Molar mass	171.627

Hazards
- Occupational safety and health (OHS/OSH)
Main hazards	Toxic
- Except where otherwise noted, data are given for materials in their standard state (at 25 °C [77 °F], 100 kPa). verify (what is ?) Infobox references

Crimidine is a convulsant poison used as a rodenticide. Crimidine was originally known by its product name, Castrix. It was originally produced in the 1940s by the conglomerate, IG Farben. It is classified as an extremely hazardous substance in the United States as defined in Section 302 of the U.S. Emergency Planning and Community Right-to-Know Act (42 U.S.C. 11002), and is subject to strict reporting requirements by facilities which produce, store, or use it in significant quantities. It is also no longer used in the United States as a rodenticide, but is still used to this day in other countries.

== Mechanism of action ==
Crimidine is a highly reactive compound. The main mechanism of toxicity with crimidine is that it inhibits vitamin B6, which is used in the metabolism of carbohydrates and amino acids. This is due to the pyrimidine ring that both compounds contain. Although, the exact mechanism of how crimidine antagonizes vitamin B6 is unknown. Another mechanism of toxicity with crimidine is due to its deactivating effect on acetylcholinesterase

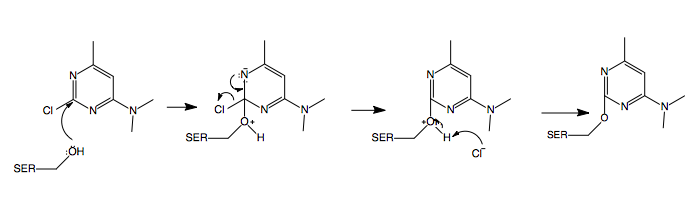

The serine residue, which is part of the acetylcholinesterase, acts a nucleophile and eventually replaces the C-Cl bond that is present in crimidine. Unlike with acetylcholine, the resulting serine-crimidine bond does not hydrolyze, permanently deactivating the enzyme

== Toxicity ==
Crimidine is a fast acting convulsant, with an LD50 of 5 mg/kg. Earliest symptoms can develop within 20–40 minutes. These symptoms can include burning, irritation, and itching at the site of exposure or intake. Following these initial symptoms, convulsions follow and can be fatal. Low dose, long-term exposure can lead to damage in the central nervous system, resulting in muscle stiffness, restlessness, and sensitivity to light and noise. Although crimidine is fast acting, it is also quickly secreted and can pass through the system in less than 24 hours..

intravenous vitamin B6 should be given as soon as poisoning is suspected
