= Lactonitrile =

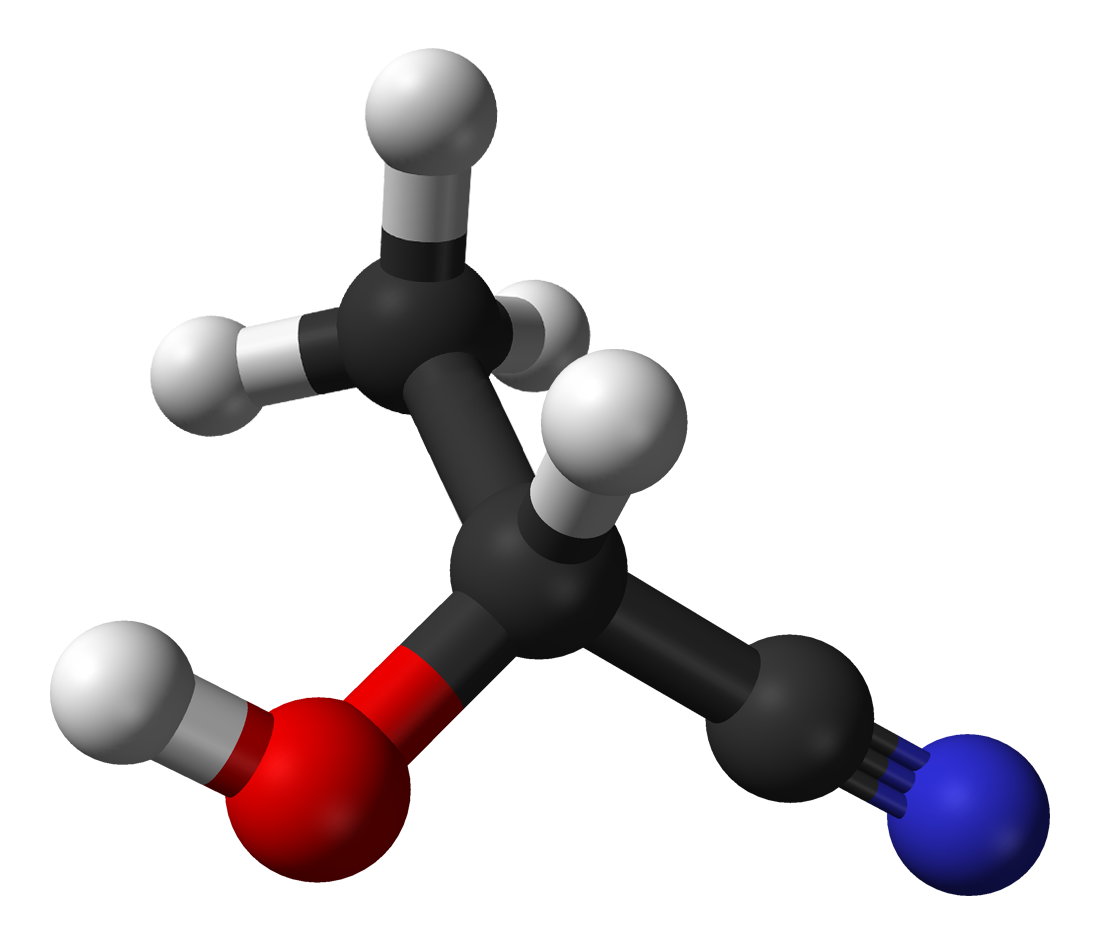

Names
- IUPAC name 2-Hydroxypropanenitrile
- Other names Acetaldehyde cyanohydrin

Identifiers
CAS Number	78-97-7
3D model (JSmol)	Interactive image
ChemSpider	21106532
ECHA InfoCard	100.001.058
PubChem CID	6572
UNII	SJ38QDA188
CompTox Dashboard (EPA)	DTXSID6025432
- InChI: InChI=1S/C3H5NO/c1-3(5)2-4/h3,5H,1H3 Key: WOFDVDFSGLBFAC-UHFFFAOYSA-N; InChI=1/C3H5NO/c1-3(5)2-4/h3,5H,1H3 Key: WOFDVDFSGLBFAC-UHFFFAOYAF
- SMILES: N#CC(C)O

Properties
Chemical formula	C_{3}H_{5}NO
Molar mass	71.079 g·mol^{−1}
Appearance	Yellow
Melting point	−40 °C (−40 °F; 233 K)
- Except where otherwise noted, data are given for materials in their standard state (at 25 °C [77 °F], 100 kPa). Infobox references

Lactonitrile is the organic compound with the formula CH_{3}CH(OH)CN. It is an intermediate in the industrial production of ethyl lactate and lactic acid. It is the cyanohydrin of acetaldehyde. It is a colorless liquid, although degraded samples can appear yellow.

== Synthesis and use ==
Lactonitrile is obtained by the addition of hydrogen cyanide to acetaldehyde.

Lactonitrile is used in making esters of lactic acid.

== Regulations ==
Cyanohydrins are sources of highly toxic hydrogen cyanide. The substance is classified as an extremely hazardous substance in the United States as defined in Section 302 of the U.S. Emergency Planning and Community Right-to-Know Act (42 U.S.C. 11002), and is subject to strict reporting requirements by facilities which produce, store, or use it in significant quantities.
