= Chlorflurazole =

Names
- IUPAC name 4,5-Dichloro-2-(trifluoromethyl)-1H-benzimidazole
- Other names Chloroflurazole

Identifiers
CAS Number	3615-21-2
3D model (JSmol)	Interactive image
ChemSpider	18149
PubChem CID	19232
UNII	ZXH1IGJ511
CompTox Dashboard (EPA)	DTXSID0041773
- InChI: InChI=1S/C8H3Cl2F3N2/c9-3-1-2-4-6(5(3)10)15-7(14-4)8(11,12)13/h1-2H,(H,14,15) Key: KSROTSBULDYPKA-UHFFFAOYSA-N; InChI=1/C8H3Cl2F3N2/c9-3-1-2-4-6(5(3)10)15-7(14-4)8(11,12)13/h1-2H,(H,14,15) Key: KSROTSBULDYPKA-UHFFFAOYAL
- SMILES: FC(F)(F)c2nc1c(Cl)c(Cl)ccc1[nH]2

Properties
Chemical formula	C_{8}H_{3}Cl_{2}F_{3}N_{2}
Molar mass	255.02 g·mol^{−1}
- Except where otherwise noted, data are given for materials in their standard state (at 25 °C [77 °F], 100 kPa). Infobox references

Chlorflurazole is an herbicide. It is classified as an extremely hazardous substance in the United States as defined in Section 302 of the U.S. Emergency Planning and Community Right-to-Know Act (42 U.S.C. 11002), and is subject to strict reporting requirements by facilities which produce, store, or use it in significant quantities.
