= CP-40294 =

Names
- Preferred IUPAC name O-(4-Nitrophenyl) O-phenyl methylphosphonothioate
- Other names Colep; Phosphonothioic acid, methyl-, O-(4-nitrophenyl) O-phenyl ester

Identifiers
CAS Number	2665-30-7
3D model (JSmol)	Interactive image
ChemSpider	16613
PubChem CID	17571
UNII	41J7Z8C9K7
CompTox Dashboard (EPA)	DTXSID7042225
- InChI: InChI=1S/C13H12NO4PS/c1-19(20,17-12-5-3-2-4-6-12)18-13-9-7-11(8-10-13)14(15)16/h2-10H,1H3 Key: VCLYJTVFGQHHHD-UHFFFAOYSA-N; InChI=1/C13H12NO4PS/c1-19(20,17-12-5-3-2-4-6-12)18-13-9-7-11(8-10-13)14(15)16/h2-10H,1H3 Key: VCLYJTVFGQHHHD-UHFFFAOYAP
- SMILES: S=P(Oc1ccc(cc1)[N+]([O-])=O)(Oc2ccccc2)C

Properties
Chemical formula	C_{13}H_{12}NO_{4}PS
Molar mass	309.28 g·mol^{−1}
- Except where otherwise noted, data are given for materials in their standard state (at 25 °C [77 °F], 100 kPa). Infobox references

CP-40294 is a broad spectrum insecticide. It is listed as an extremely hazardous substance according to the U.S. Emergency Planning and Community Right-to-Know Act.
