= Chlorthiophos =

Names
- IUPAC name (2,5-dichloro-4-methylsulfanylphenoxy)-diethoxy-sulfanylidene-λ5-phosphane
- Other names Celathion; Celamerck S-2957; Caswell No. 310A

Identifiers
CAS Number	60238-56-4
3D model (JSmol)	Interactive image
ChemSpider	484552
ECHA InfoCard	100.040.588
PubChem CID	30859
UNII	O256QW5Y0Q
CompTox Dashboard (EPA)	DTXSID9041786
- InChI: InChI=1S/C11H15Cl2O4PS/c1-4-15-18(14,16-5-2)17-10-6-9(13)11(19-3)7-8(10)12/h6-7H,4-5H2,1-3H3 Key: ZYZAICVMEBZORH-UHFFFAOYSA-N; InChI=1/C11H15Cl2O4PS/c1-4-15-18(14,16-5-2)17-10-6-9(13)11(19-3)7-8(10)12/h6-7H,4-5H2,1-3H3 Key: ZYZAICVMEBZORH-UHFFFAOYAM
- SMILES: CCOP(=S)(OCC)OC1=CC(=C(C=C1Cl)SC)Cl

Properties
Chemical formula	C_{11}H_{15}Cl_{2}O_{3}PS_{2}
Molar mass	361.23 g·mol^{−1}
- Except where otherwise noted, data are given for materials in their standard state (at 25 °C [77 °F], 100 kPa). Infobox references

Chlorthiophos is an organophosphorus pesticide. It is a mixture of isomers:

O,O-Diethyl-O-(2,5-dichloro-4-methylthio)phenyl phosphorothioate (ca. 73%)
O,O-Diethyl-O-(4,5-dichloro-2-methylthio)phenyl phosphorothioate (ca. 13%)
O,O-Diethyl-O-(2,4-dichloro-5-methylthio)phenyl phosphorothioate (ca. 14%)

It is extremely poisonous and is classified as an extremely hazardous substance in the United States as defined in Section 302 of the U.S. Emergency Planning and Community Right-to-Know Act (42 U.S.C. 11002), and is subject to strict reporting requirements by facilities which produce, store, or use it in significant quantities.
