= Endothion =

Names
- Preferred IUPAC name S-[(5-Methoxy-4-oxo-4H-pyran-2-yl)methyl] O,O-dimethyl phosphorothioate

Identifiers
CAS Number	2778-04-3
3D model (JSmol)	Interactive image
ChemSpider	16569
ECHA InfoCard	100.018.612
PubChem CID	17717
UNII	V047DQ6B7X
CompTox Dashboard (EPA)	DTXSID2041911
- InChI: InChI=1S/C9H10NO3PS/c1-11-14(15,12-2)13-9-5-3-8(7-10)4-6-9/h3-6H,1-2H3 Key: SCKHCCSZFPSHGR-UHFFFAOYSA-N; InChI=1S/C9H13O6PS/c1-12-9-5-15-7(4-8(9)10)6-17-16(11,13-2)14-3/h4-5H,6H2,1-3H3 Key: YCAGGFXSFQFVQL-UHFFFAOYSA-N
- SMILES: COC1=COC(=CC1=O)CSP(=O)(OC)OC

Properties
Chemical formula	C_{9}H_{13}O_{6}PS
Molar mass	280.23 g·mol^{−1}
Appearance	White Crystals
Density	0.932 g/cm^{3}
Melting point	−7 to 96 °C; 19 to 205 °F; 266 to 369 K
Solubility in water	150 g/100 ml

Hazards
NFPA 704 (fire diamond)	3 0 0
- Safety data sheet (SDS)
- Except where otherwise noted, data are given for materials in their standard state (at 25 °C [77 °F], 100 kPa). verify (what is ?) Infobox references

Endothion is an organic compound used as an insecticide and acaricides. It is part of the chemical class of organophosphorus compounds. It is generally described as white crystals with a slight odor. It is used as an insecticide, but not sold in the United States or Canada.

== Synonyms ==
- *2-(S-DIMETHYLPHOSPHOROTHIO- METHYL)-5-METHOXY-4-PYRONE
- 5-METHOXY-2-(DIMETHOXYPHOSPHINYLTHIOMETHYL) PYRONE-4
- AC-18737
- ENDOCID
- ENDOCIDE
- ENT 24653
- EXOTHION
- FMC 5767
- NIA 5767
- NIAGARA 5767
- O,O-DIMETHYL PHOSPHOROTHIOATE, S-ESTER WITH 2-(MERCAPTOMETHYL)-5-METHOXY-4H-PYRAN-4-ONE
- O,O-DIMETHYL S-(5-METHOXY- 4-OXO-4H-PYRAN-2-YL) PHOSPHOROTHIOATE
- O,O-DIMETHYL S-(5-METHOXYPYRONYL- 2-METHYL) THIOPHOSPHATE
- PHOSPHATE 100
- PHOSPHOPYRON
- PHOSPHOPYRONE
- PHOSPHOROTHIOIC ACID, O,O-DIMETHYL ESTER, S-ESTER WITH 2-(MERCAPTOMETHYL)-5-METHOXY-4H-PYRAN-4-ONE
- PHOSPHOROTHIOIC ACID, S-((5-METHOXY-4-OXO-4H-PYRAN-2-YL)METHYL) O,O-DIMETHYL ESTER
- S-(5-METHOXY-4-PYRON-2-YLMETHYL) DIMETHYL PHOSPHOROTHIOATE
- S-5-METHOXY-4-OXOPYRAN-2-YLMETHYL DIMETHYL PHOSPHOROTHIOATE
- S-5-METHOXY-4-PYRON-2-YLMETHYL O,O-DIMETHYL PHOSPHOROTHIOATE
- S-[(5-METHOXY-4-OXO-4H-PYRAN-2-YL)METHYL] O,O-DIMETHYL PHOSPHOROTHIOATE

== Safety ==
Endothion can enter the body via inhalation, ingestion, and contact with the skin and eyes. Symptoms of endothion poisoning include dyspnea, rales, diarrhea, bronchospasm, bronchorrhea, tachypnea, and opsoclonus, Noncardiacogenic Pulmonary Edema, Salivation.
