= Tirpate =

Names
- Preferred IUPAC name N-[(2,4-Dimethyl-1,3-dithiolan-2-yl)methylidene]-N′-methylhydroxylamine-O-carboxamide

Identifiers
CAS Number	26419-73-8
3D model (JSmol)	Interactive image
ChemSpider	30916
PubChem CID	33507
UNII	8W03WH1E76
CompTox Dashboard (EPA)	DTXSID3042475
- InChI: InChI=1S/C8H14N2O2S2/c1-6-4-13-8(2,14-6)5-10-12-7(11)9-3/h5-6H,4H2,1-3H3,(H,9,11) Key: GHFMMRFMDHDOBP-UHFFFAOYSA-N; InChI=1/C8H14N2O2S2/c1-6-4-13-8(2,14-6)5-10-12-7(11)9-3/h5-6H,4H2,1-3H3,(H,9,11) Key: GHFMMRFMDHDOBP-UHFFFAOYAQ
- SMILES: O=C(ON=CC1(SCC(S1)C)C)NC

Properties
Chemical formula	C_{8}H_{14}N_{2}O_{2}S_{2}
Molar mass	234.33 g·mol^{−1}
- Except where otherwise noted, data are given for materials in their standard state (at 25 °C [77 °F], 100 kPa). Infobox references

Tirpate is a pesticide and nematocide. As of 1998, the United States Environmental Protection Agency listed the substance as discontinued in manufacturing. It is classified as an extremely hazardous substance in the United States as defined in Section 302 of the U.S. Emergency Planning and Community Right-to-Know Act (42 U.S.C. 11002), and is subject to strict reporting requirements by facilities which produce, store, or use it in significant quantities.

Tirpate can also be used as a radiolabel in plant cultures.
