= Dioxathion =

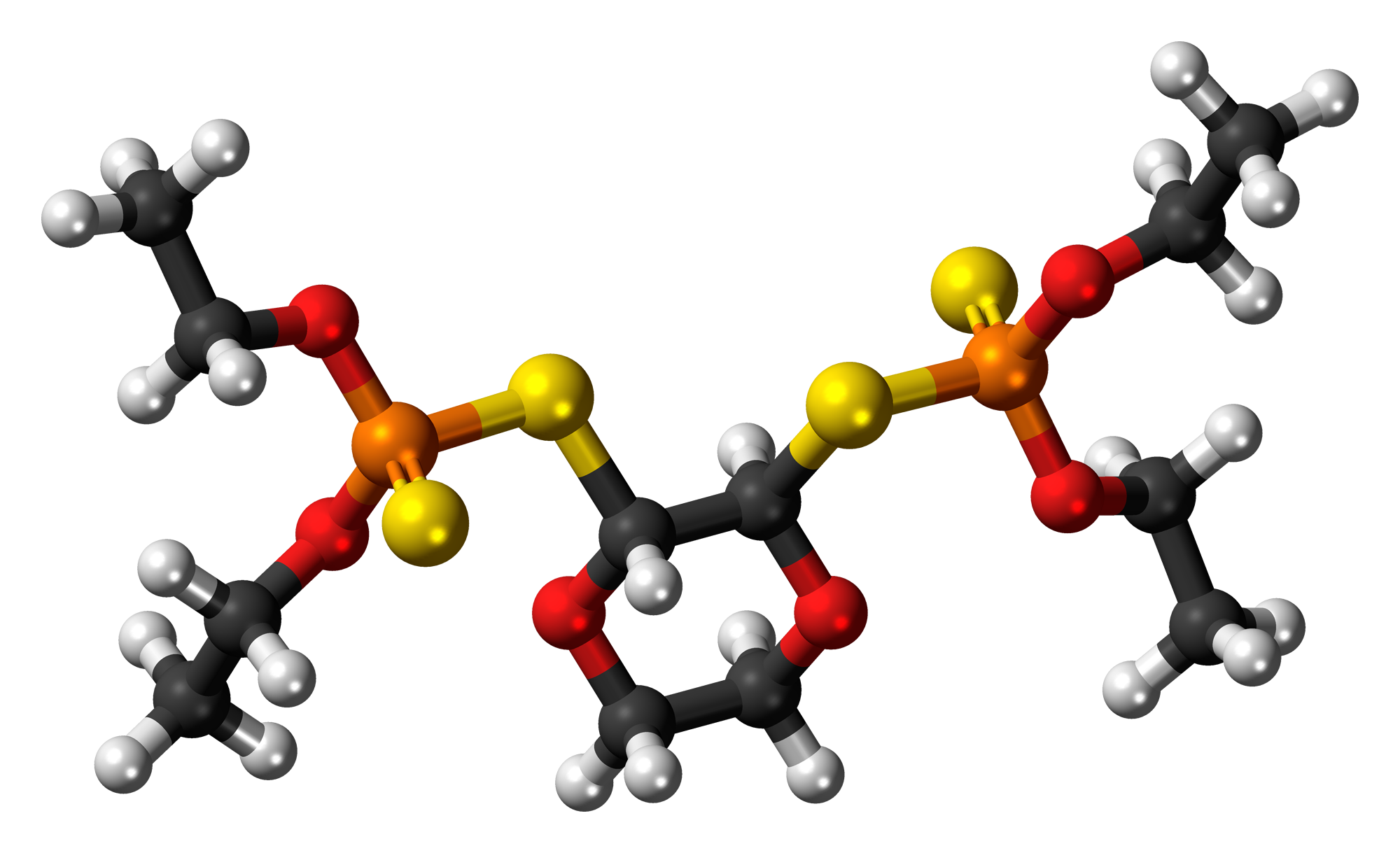

Names
- IUPAC name S,S'-1,4-dioxane-2,3-diyl O,O,O',O'-tetraethyl bis(dithiophosphate)
- Other names phosphorodithoic acid; S,S’-1,4-Dioxane- 2,3-Diyl; 0,0,0’,0’-Tetraethyl Ester; Navadel; Delnatex; Delnav; Deltic; dioxane phosphate p-Dioxane-2,3-diyl ethyl phosphorodithioate 2,3-p-Dioxanethiol-S,S-bis(O,O-diethyl phosphoro-dithioate)

Identifiers
| CAS Number | 78-34-2 |
| 3D model (JSmol) | Interactive image |
| ChemSpider | 6283 |
| ECHA InfoCard | 100.001.007 |
| PubChem CID | 6531 |
| UNII | J2DF82JA7N |
| CompTox Dashboard (EPA) | DTXSID9020534 |
- InChI: InChI=1S/C12H26O6P2S4/c1-5-15-19(21,16-6-2)23-11-12(14-10-9-13-11)24-20(22,17-7-3)18-8-4/h11-12H,5-10H2,1-4H3 Key: VBKKVDGJXVOLNE-UHFFFAOYSA-N; InChI=1/C12H26O6P2S4/c1-5-15-19(21,16-6-2)23-11-12(14-10-9-13-11)24-20(22,17-7-3)18-8-4/h11-12H,5-10H2,1-4H3 Key: VBKKVDGJXVOLNE-UHFFFAOYAS
- SMILES: S=P(SC1OCCOC1SP(=S)(OCC)OCC)(OCC)OCC

Properties
| Chemical formula | C_{12}H_{26}O_{6}P_{2}S_{4} |
| Molar mass | 456.2 g/mol |
| Appearance | Thick reddish-brown liquid/powder |
| Odor | garlicky |
| Density | 1.26 g/cm^{3} |
| Melting point | −20 °C (−4 °F; 253 K) |
| Solubility in water | Insoluble |

Hazards
| Flash point | noncombustible |
- NIOSH (US health exposure limits)
| PEL (Permissible) | none |
| REL (Recommended) | TWA 0.2 mg/m^{3} |
| IDLH (Immediate danger) | N.D. |
- Except where otherwise noted, data are given for materials in their standard state (at 25 °C [77 °F], 100 kPa). verify (what is ?) Infobox references

Dioxathion, systematically known as p-dioxane-2,3-diyl ethyl phosphorodithioate, is an organophosphate pesticide. It is used as an insecticide on livestock and as an acaricide on citrus fruits, deciduous fruits and nuts.

== Uses ==
Under the trade name Delnav, it can be used to control insects and mites on apples, pears, quince, grapes, and walnuts, and finds use in the control of ticks, horn flies, lice and sheep keds in various livestock, either as a spray or as a dip. Under the trade name Deltic, it is a restricted use pesticide for exterior control of fleas, ticks and mites, in kennels, dog houses, yards, and other recreational areas.

== Toxicity ==
Dioxathion is an Extremely Hazardous Substance, as defined by Section 302 of the U.S. Emergency Planning and Community Right-to-Know Act, and is no longer allowed to be sold in the United States. However, it continues to see use in some other countries. It has been known to cause inhibition of the enzyme cholinesterase in rats, and it is recommended that people who have exposure to dioxathion regularly get their plasma and red blood cell cholinesterase levels assessed. Persons exposed to other chemicals which affect cholinesterase levels, e.g. other organophosphates or carbamates, may be at an increased risk. There are no known carcinogenic or reproductive effects, but long term exposure may result in nerve damage, poor motor coordination, and personality changes of anxiety, depression or irritability.

Short-term effects may include irritation to the eyes, pupil constriction and blurring of vision, abdominal cramps, laboured breathing, nausea, vomiting, diarrhoea, muscle cramps and excess salivation. These are mostly classic symptoms of organophosphate poisoning.

Dioxathion must be stored away from alkalis, iron, tin and strong acids. Contact can be avoided by using protective clothing and eyeware. If poisoning occurs, a physician may administer atropine sulfate, or pralidoxime in case of severe poisoning.
