= Fensulfothion =

Names
- Preferred IUPAC name O,O-Diethyl O-[4-(methanesulfinyl)phenyl] phosphorothioate

Identifiers
CAS Number	115-90-2
3D model (JSmol)	Interactive image
ChemSpider	7991
ECHA InfoCard	100.003.741
PubChem CID	8292
UNII	VB39B105PO
CompTox Dashboard (EPA)	DTXSID6021953
- InChI: InChI=1S/C11H17O4PS2/c1-4-13-16(17,14-5-2)15-10-6-8-11(9-7-10)18(3)12/h6-9H,4-5H2,1-3H3 Key: XDNBJTQLKCIJBV-UHFFFAOYSA-N; InChI=1/C11H17O4PS2/c1-4-13-16(17,14-5-2)15-10-6-8-11(9-7-10)18(3)12/h6-9H,4-5H2,1-3H3 Key: XDNBJTQLKCIJBV-UHFFFAOYAH
- SMILES: S=P(Oc1ccc(cc1)S(=O)C)(OCC)OCC

Properties
Chemical formula	C_{11}H_{17}O_{4}PS_{2}
Molar mass	308.35 g·mol^{−1}
Appearance	Brown liquid or yellow oil
Density	1.20 g/mL (20°C)
Solubility in water	0.2% (25°C)

Hazards
- Occupational safety and health (OHS/OSH)
Main hazards	combustible
- NIOSH (US health exposure limits)
PEL (Permissible)	none
REL (Recommended)	TWA 0.1 mg/m^{3}
IDLH (Immediate danger)	N.D.
- Except where otherwise noted, data are given for materials in their standard state (at 25 °C [77 °F], 100 kPa). Infobox references

Fensulfothion is an organophosphorus compound with the formula CH_{2}S(O)C_{6}H_{4}OP(S)(OC_{2}H_{5})_{2}. It is an insecticide and nematicide that acts by inhibiting the enzyme acetylcholinesterase. Chemically, it is classified as a thiophosphate. It is widely used on corn, onions, rutabagas, pineapple, bananas, sugar cane, sugar beets, pea nuts, etc.

== Safety ==
It is highly toxic and listed as an extremely hazardous substance.
