= Bitoscanate =

Names
- Preferred IUPAC name 1,4-Diisothiocyanatobenzene
- Other names Bitoscanat; PDITC; Phenylene-1,4-diisothiocyanate; p-Phenylene bisisothiocyanate; p-Phenylene diisothiocyanate

Identifiers
| CAS Number | 4044-65-9 |
| 3D model (JSmol) | Interactive image |
| ChEMBL | ChEMBL2104676 |
| ChemSpider | 18799 |
| ECHA InfoCard | 100.021.584 |
| PubChem CID | 19958 |
| UNII | 6D1R3P86GX |
| CompTox Dashboard (EPA) | DTXSID3046532 |
- InChI: InChI=1S/C8H4N2S2/c11-5-9-7-1-2-8(4-3-7)10-6-12/h1-4H Key: OMWQUXGVXQELIX-UHFFFAOYSA-N; InChI=1/C8H4N2S2/c11-5-9-7-1-2-8(4-3-7)10-6-12/h1-4H Key: OMWQUXGVXQELIX-UHFFFAOYAS
- SMILES: C1=CC(=CC=C1N=C=S)N=C=S

Properties
| Chemical formula | C_{8}H_{4}N_{2}S_{2} |
| Molar mass | 192.25 g·mol^{−1} |
| Melting point | 132 °C (270 °F; 405 K) |
- Except where otherwise noted, data are given for materials in their standard state (at 25 °C [77 °F], 100 kPa). Infobox references

Bitoscanate is an organic chemical compound used in the treatment of hookworms. It is classified as an extremely hazardous substance in the United States as defined in Section 302 of the U.S. Emergency Planning and Community Right-to-Know Act (42 U.S.C. 11002), and is subject to strict reporting requirements by facilities which produce, store, or use it in significant quantities.
