= Fluomine =

Names
- Other names: Fluomine dust; Cobalt(II), N,N'-ethylenebis-(3-fluorosalicyclideneiminato)-; Cobalt, bis(3-fluorosalicylaldehyde)ethylenediimine-

Identifiers
CAS Number	62207-76-5
3D model (JSmol)	Interactive image
ECHA InfoCard	100.057.672
EC Number	263-458-2
PubChem CID	43957
CompTox Dashboard (EPA)	DTXSID40893079
- InChI: InChI=1S/C16H14F2N2O2.Co/c17-13-3-1-5-15(21)11(13)9-19-7-8-20-10-12-14(18)4-2-6-16(12)22;/h1-6,9-10,21-22H,7-8H2;/q;+2/p-2/b19-9+,20-10+; Key: VUNNDCACJFYYFK-HCURTGQUSA-L
- SMILES: c12c(cccc1[O-][Co+2]13[N](=C2)CC[N]1=Cc1c(cccc1[O-]3)F)F

Properties
Chemical formula	C_{16}H_{12}CoF_{2}N_{2}O_{2}
Molar mass	361.214 g·mol^{−1}
- Except where otherwise noted, data are given for materials in their standard state (at 25 °C [77 °F], 100 kPa). Infobox references

Fluomine is a chemical compound containing a cobalt chelate. It has the ability to form a complex with molecular oxygen (O_{2}) and then release it upon heating. Because of this ability to reversibly sorb and desorb oxygen, it has been used in high-altitude aircraft oxygen-generating systems.

The toxicity of fluomine has been studied and it is classified by the Emergency Planning and Community Right-to-Know Act as an extremely hazardous substance.
