= Oxydisulfoton =

Names
- Preferred IUPAC name S-[2-(Ethanesulfinyl)ethyl] O,O-diethyl phosphorothioate

Identifiers
CAS Number	2497-07-6
3D model (JSmol)	Interactive image
ChemSpider	16321
ECHA InfoCard	100.017.891
PubChem CID	17242
UNII	573PQK81XK
CompTox Dashboard (EPA)	DTXSID4037536
- InChI: InChI=1S/C8H19O3PS3/c1-4-10-12(13,11-5-2)14-7-8-15(9)6-3/h4-8H2,1-3H3 Key: UPUGLJYNCXXUQV-UHFFFAOYSA-N; InChI=1/C8H19O3PS3/c1-4-10-12(13,11-5-2)14-7-8-15(9)6-3/h4-8H2,1-3H3 Key: UPUGLJYNCXXUQV-UHFFFAOYAE
- SMILES: O=S(CCSP(=S)(OCC)OCC)CC

Properties
Chemical formula	C_{8}H_{19}O_{3}PS_{3}
Molar mass	290.39 g·mol^{−1}
- Except where otherwise noted, data are given for materials in their standard state (at 25 °C [77 °F], 100 kPa). Infobox references

Oxydisulfoton is a chemical compound used as an acaricide and insecticide. It is classified as an extremely hazardous substance in the United States as defined in Section 302 of the U.S. Emergency Planning and Community Right-to-Know Act (42 U.S.C. 11002), and is subject to strict reporting requirements by facilities which produce, store, or use it in significant quantities.
