= Toxidrome =

Syndrome caused by a dangerous level of a toxin

Toxidrome
Symptoms	BP	HR	RR	Temp	Pupil size	Bowel sounds	Diaphoresis
anticholinergic	up	up	up	up	up	down	down
cholinergic	~	~	~	~	down	up	up
hallucinogenic	up	up	up	~	up	up	~
sympathomimetic	up	up	up	up	up	up	up
sedative–hypnotic	down	down	down	down	~	down	down

A toxidrome (a portmanteau of toxic and syndrome, coined in 1970 by Mofenson and Greensher) is a syndrome caused by a dangerous level of a toxin in the body. It is often the consequence of a drug overdose. Common symptoms include dizziness, disorientation, nausea, vomiting and oscillopsia. It may indicate a medical emergency requiring treatment at a poison control center. Aside from poisoning, a systemic infection may also lead to one. Classic toxidromes may be variable or obscured by co-ingestion of multiple drugs.

A common tool for assessing for the presence of toxidrome in the United Kingdom is the CRESS tool.

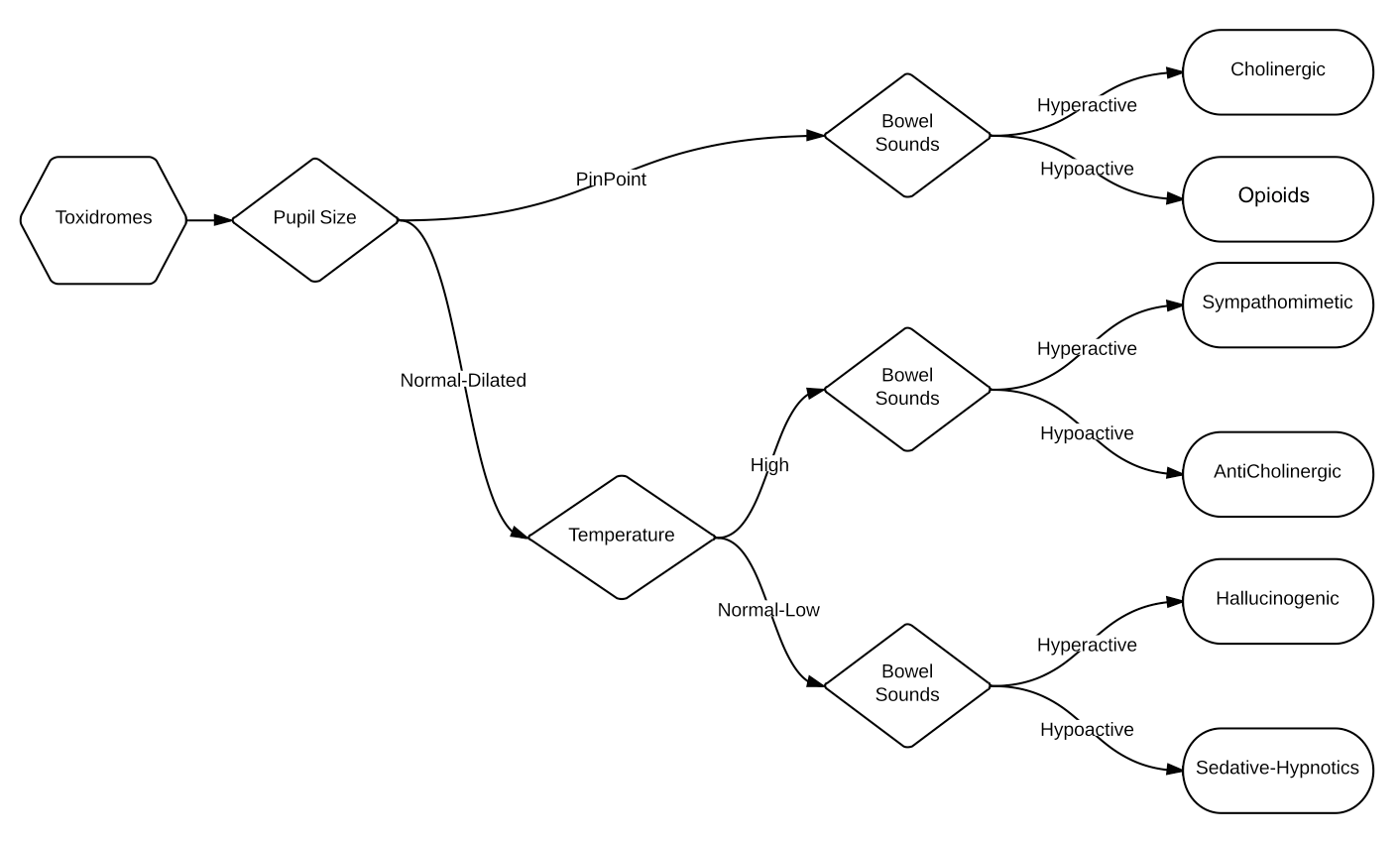
Toxidrome flowchart diagnosis

== Anticholinergic ==
The symptoms of an anticholinergic toxidrome include blurred vision, coma, decreased bowel sounds, delirium, dry skin, fever, flushing, hallucinations, ileus, memory loss, mydriasis (dilated pupils), myoclonus, psychosis, seizures and urinary retention. Complications include hypertension, hyperthermia and tachycardia. Substances that may cause this toxidrome include antihistamines, antipsychotics, antidepressants, antiparkinsonian drugs, atropine, benztropine, datura, diphenhydramine and scopolamine.

== Cholinergic ==
The symptoms of a cholinergic toxidrome include bronchorrhea, confusion, defecation, diaphoresis, diarrhea, emesis, lacrimation, miosis, muscle fasciculations, salivation, seizures, urination and weakness. Complications include bradycardia, hypothermia and tachypnea. Substances that may cause this toxidrome include carbamates, mushrooms and organophosphates.

== Hallucinogenic ==
The symptoms of a hallucinogenic toxidrome include disorientation, hallucinations, hyperactive bowel sounds, panic and seizures. Complications include hypertension, tachycardia and tachypnea. Substances that may cause this toxidrome include substituted amphetamines, cocaine and phencyclidine.

== Opiate ==
The symptoms of an opiate toxidrome include the classic triad of coma, pinpoint pupils and respiratory depression as well as altered mental states, shock, pulmonary edema and unresponsiveness. Complications include bradycardia, hypotension and hypothermia. Substances that may cause this toxidrome are opioids.

== Sedative/hypnotic ==
The symptoms of sedative/hypnotic toxidrome include ataxia, blurred vision, coma, confusion, delirium, deterioration of central nervous system functions, diplopia, dysesthesias, hallucinations, nystagmus, paresthesias, sedation, slurred speech and stupor. Apnea is a potential complication. Substances that may cause it include anticonvulsants, barbiturates, benzodiazepines, gamma-Hydroxybutyric acid, Methaqualone and ethanol. While most sedative-hypnotics are anticonvulsant, some such as GHB and methaqualone instead lower the seizure threshold, so can cause paradoxical seizures in overdose.

== Sympathomimetic ==
The symptoms of a sympathomimetic toxidrome include anxiety, delusions, diaphoresis, hyperreflexia, mydriasis, paranoia, piloerection and seizures. Complications include hypertension and tachycardia. Substances that may cause this toxidrome include cocaine, amphetamine and compounds based upon amphetamine's structure such as ephedrine (Ma Huang), methamphetamine, phenylpropanolamine and pseudoephedrine. The bronchodilator salbutamol may also cause this toxidrome. It may appear very similar to the anticholinergic toxidrome, but is distinguished by hyperactive bowel sounds and sweating.
