= BAY-29952 =

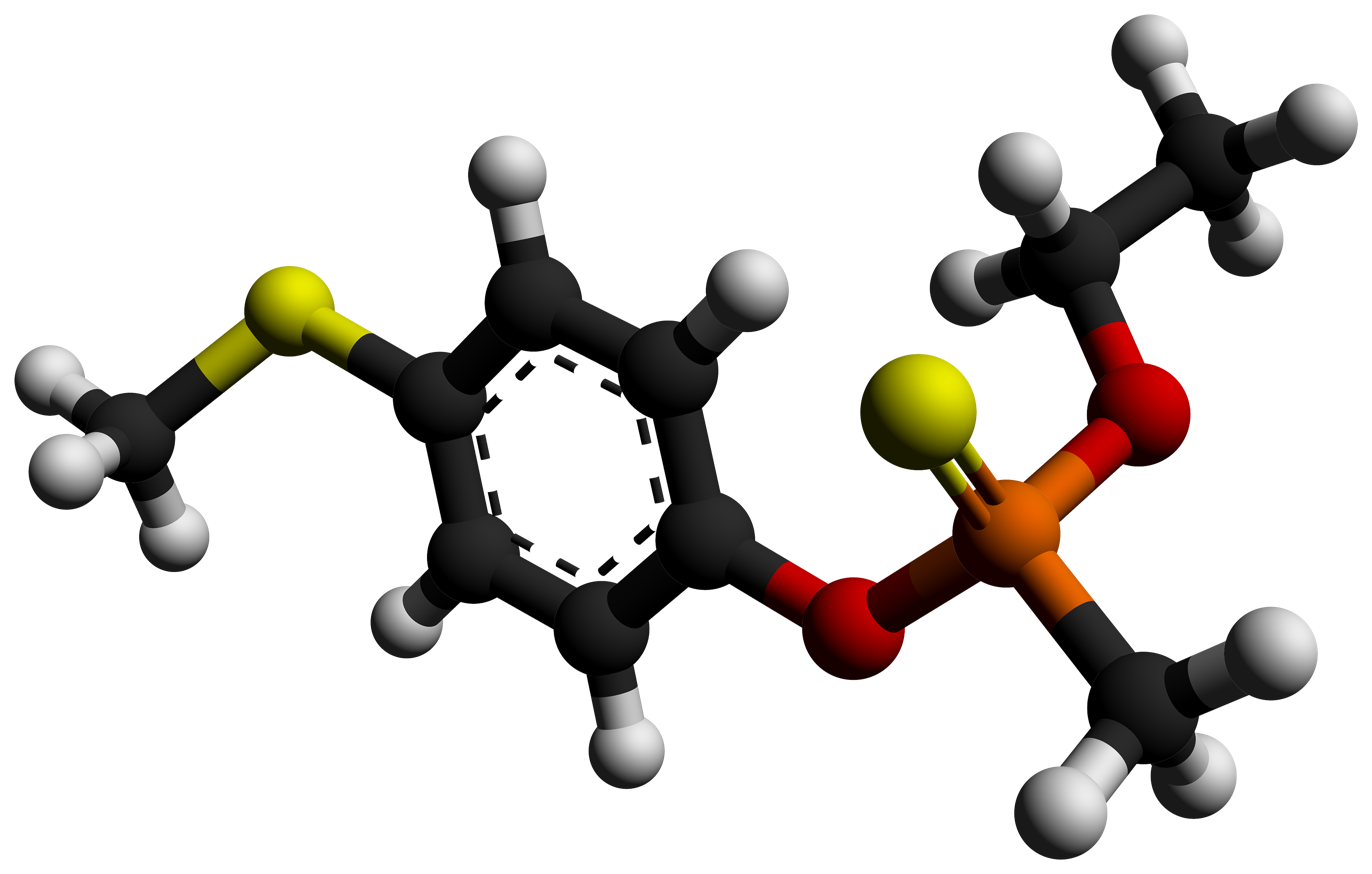

Names
- Preferred IUPAC name O-Ethyl O-[4-(methylsulfanyl)phenyl] methylphosphonothioate
- Other names ENT 25,612; Phosphonothioic acid, methyl-, O-ethyl O-(4-(methylthio)phenyl) ester

Identifiers
| CAS Number | 2703-13-1 |
| 3D model (JSmol) | Interactive image |
| ChemSpider | 16651 |
| PubChem CID | 17612 |
| UNII | 48ZVC11JGJ |
| CompTox Dashboard (EPA) | DTXSID0042240 |
- InChI: InChI=1S/C10H15O2PS2/c1-4-11-13(2,14)12-9-5-7-10(15-3)8-6-9/h5-8H,4H2,1-3H3 Key: LUCDVNXIIQYRLZ-UHFFFAOYSA-N; InChI=1/C10H15O2PS2/c1-4-11-13(2,14)12-9-5-7-10(15-3)8-6-9/h5-8H,4H2,1-3H3 Key: LUCDVNXIIQYRLZ-UHFFFAOYAL
- SMILES: S=P(Oc1ccc(SC)cc1)(OCC)C

Properties
| Chemical formula | C_{10}H_{15}O_{2}PS_{2} |
| Molar mass | 262.32 g·mol^{−1} |
- Except where otherwise noted, data are given for materials in their standard state (at 25 °C [77 °F], 100 kPa). Infobox references

BAY-29952 is a broad spectrum insecticide. It is listed as an extremely hazardous substance according to the U.S. Emergency Planning and Community Right-to-Know Act.
