= Isopropylmethylpyrazolyl dimethylcarbamate =

Names
- Preferred IUPAC name 3-Methyl-1-(propan-2-yl)-1H-pyrazol-5-yl dimethylcarbamate
- Other names 1-Isopropyl-3-methyl-1H-pyrazol-5-yl dimethylcarbamate Isolan; 3-Methyl-1-(1-methylethyl)-1H-pyrazol-5-yl N,N-dimethylcarbamate

Identifiers
CAS Number	119-38-0
3D model (JSmol)	Interactive image
ChemSpider	8087
ECHA InfoCard	100.003.926
PubChem CID	8393
UNII	K7716TIH63
CompTox Dashboard (EPA)	DTXSID2020765
- InChI: InChI=1S/C10H17N3O2/c1-7(2)13-9(6-8(3)11-13)15-10(14)12(4)5/h6-7H,1-5H3 Key: RNNBHZYEKNHLKT-UHFFFAOYSA-N; InChI=1/C10H17N3O2/c1-7(2)13-9(6-8(3)11-13)15-10(14)12(4)5/h6-7H,1-5H3 Key: RNNBHZYEKNHLKT-UHFFFAOYAD
- SMILES: O=C(Oc1cc(nn1C(C)C)C)N(C)C

Properties
Chemical formula	C_{10}H_{17}N_{3}O_{2}
Molar mass	211.265 g·mol^{−1}
- Except where otherwise noted, data are given for materials in their standard state (at 25 °C [77 °F], 100 kPa). Infobox references

Isopropylmethylpyrazolyl dimethylcarbamate is a chemical compound used in Europe in aphicides and insecticides. As of 1998, the United States Environmental Protection Agency listed it as an unregistered pesticide in the United States. In China, it is used under the name isolan.

It is classified as an extremely hazardous substance in the United States as defined in Section 302 of the U.S. Emergency Planning and Community Right-to-Know Act (42 U.S.C. 11002), and is subject to strict reporting requirements by facilities which produce, store, or use it in significant quantities.
