= Norbormide =

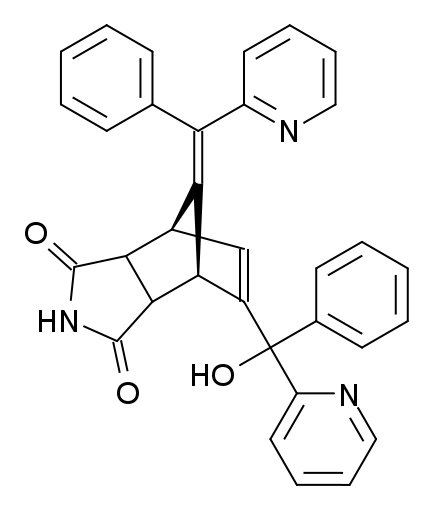

Names
- Preferred IUPAC name 5-(α-Hydroxy-α-2-pyridylbenzyl)-7-(α-2-pyridylbenzylidene)-5-norbornene-2,3-dicarboximide
- Systematic IUPAC name (10E)-8-[hydroxy(phenyl)pyridin-2-ylmethyl]-10-[phenyl(pyridin-2-yl)methylidene]-4-azatricyclo[5.2.1.0^{2,6}]dec-8-ene-3,5-dione

Identifiers
CAS Number	991-42-4
3D model (JSmol)	Interactive image
ChemSpider	10468605
ECHA InfoCard	100.012.354
EC Number	213-589-6
KEGG	C19139
PubChem CID	24744067 (1R,7S); 24840617 (6R,7R); 12399560
UNII	K4085589CZ
CompTox Dashboard (EPA)	DTXSID8042216
- InChI: InChI=1S/C33H25N3O3/c37-31-28-22-19-23(33(39,21-13-5-2-6-14-21)25-16-8-10-18-35-25)29(30(28)32(38)36-31)27(22)26(20-11-3-1-4-12-20)24-15-7-9-17-34-24/h1-19,22,28-30,39H,(H,36,37,38)/b27-26+ Key: DNTHHIVFNQZZRD-CYYJNZCTSA-N
- SMILES: OC(C1=CC2C3C(C1\C2=C(/C1=CC=CC=C1)C1=CC=CC=N1)C(=O)NC3=O)(C1=CC=CC=C1)C1=NC=CC=C1

Properties
Chemical formula	C_{33}H_{25}N_{3}O_{3}
Molar mass	511.570

Hazards
- Occupational safety and health (OHS/OSH)
Main hazards	Toxic
- Except where otherwise noted, data are given for materials in their standard state (at 25 °C [77 °F], 100 kPa). Infobox references

Norbormide (Raticate, Shoxin) is a toxic compound used as a rodenticide. It has several mechanisms of action, acting as a vasoconstrictor and calcium channel blocker, but is selectively toxic to rats and has relatively low toxicity to other species, due to a species specific action of opening the permeability transition pores in rat mitochondria.

It is classified as an extremely hazardous substance in the United States as defined in Section 302 of the U.S. Emergency Planning and Community Right-to-Know Act (42 U.S.C. 11002), and is subject to strict reporting requirements by facilities which produce, store, or use it in significant quantities.

== History ==
In the early 1960s norbormide was developed to serve as a non-anticoagulant rat poison. During the 1970s, however, the utilization of this rodenticide decreased, since anticoagulant toxins seemed to be more effective against a wider range of rodents. NRB only kills rodents of the genus Rattus (R. norvegicus, R. exulans and R. rattus) and happens to be moderately innocent to other rodents and mammals. Although many view its selective feature as a disadvantage, scientists of Landcare Research in New Zealand search for ways to improve this rodenticide and develop several analogues.

== Structure and reactivity ==
Norbormide is an organic compound with the following systematic name: 5-(α-hydroxy-α-2-pyridylbenzyl)-7-(α-2-pyridylbenzylidene)-5-norbornene-2,3-dicarboximide. The structure consists of a norbornene ring, that is merged with an imide ring opposite to the double bond. One of the carbon atoms of this double bond is connected to another carbon atom, that is bound to a hydroxyl, a pyridyl and a phenyl group. The bridging carbon of the norbornene ring is double bonded to a carbon atom to which a pyridyl and a phenyl group are attached. There are eight possible stereoisomers of norbormide. On the exocyclic double bond there is cis/trans-isomerism. The imide ring can have an endo or an exo orientation and for the hydroxyl group erythro and threo isomers are possible. The vasoconstrictor properties of norbormide turn out to be very dependent on stereochemistry. Only the endo isomers are toxic in rats and the threo isomers are ten times as potent as the erythro isomers. The cis-endo-threo isomer has been found to be the isomer with the most potent vasoconstrictor properties. In this structure there is a hydrogen bond between the hydroxyl group and the adjacent pyridine ring. Studies reveal that norbormide toxicity is sensitive to structural changes, in almost all cases the toxicity decreases due to structural changes. Only substitution of the NH proton of the imide with certain groups could give toxic activity comparable to norbormide itself.

== Available forms ==
=== Different stereoisomers ===
During the synthesis of norbormide, five of the eight possible stereoisomers are formed in a significant amount, namely all the endo stereoisomers and the cis-exo-stereoisomer. Most of the potency of norbormide is due to the trans-endo-threo (LD50 = 0.50 mg/kg (rat)) and the cis-endo-threo isomers (LD50 = 0.15 mg/kg (rat)). These two isomers form approximately half of the commercial mixture.

=== Derivatives ===
Studies have been done in which was searched for derivative compounds of norbormide that are more toxic. Addition or substitution of miscellaneous groups never turned out to give considerably more toxic compounds. In most cases compounds were obtained, being significantly less toxic. A problem of using norbormide as a rodenticide is bait shyness, this means that after the rat eats a little bit of it, the rat gets ill and avoids the toxin then, also the taste is supposed to be bad. Recent studies have been looking for prodrugs of norbormide that release the toxicant slowly and thereby delay the toxic effects. Prodrugs have been found that appear to have these properties. Subsequent studies need to be done for refinement before usage eventually might be possible.

== Mechanism of action ==
The mechanism for the vasoconstrictor effect is predicted to be mediated by the modulation of calcium influx. This influx of calcium can leads to contraction in the myocytes. Probably the influx of calcium is mediated by the phospholipase C (PLC)-coupled receptors, in rat peripheral artery myocytes.

Other research of Sergio Bova et al. has shown that in respiratory, urinary and gastrointestinal smooth muscle there was no contraction by norbormide. The symptoms of norbormide were very similar to the better known Ca2+ entry blocker agents. Therefore, norbormide is not only species specific but in addition tissue specific.

Norbormide has a strong effect on the mitochondria in the cell. Therefore, norbormide transfer through the outer mitochondrial membrane (OMM) to the inner mitochondrial space. At this location or at the matrix it induce the permeability transition pore (PTP). This PTP is an inner mitochondrial membrane (IMM) channel, whose opening leads to an increasing permeability for ions with an exclusion size of about 1500 Da. The transport of norborimide comes from a translocation protein (TSPO) also known as peripheral benzodiazepine receptor. The TSPO is selective for the norbormide transport in rats. In figure 6.1 shows the crucial alignment of rat, mouse and guinea pig LPSO. There are a few differences in amino acids, but the position of 113 is very similar in between the species and other species like dogs, humans and chickens. Where the rat have at position 113 a methionine (M) others species have a leucine amino acid. This results probably for the different amount of transport between rat and other species.

== Metabolism ==
A compound's toxicological property has been linked to metabolic pathways, which often differ in various species. For that reason the correlation between toxicity and metabolism has been observed to obtain a clear insight into cellular metabolism, both in vitro and in vivo conditions.

=== In vitro experiment ===
In vitro studies on liver preparations from rats and other rodents revealed that hydroxylation is the major process during the metabolism of NRB. Furthermore, the metabolites between the sexes of the rat seemed to deviate from one another. First and foremost when NRB had been incubated with the liver S9 fraction, a few metabolic products were observed. The S9 fraction has been defined as "Supernatant fraction obtained from an organ (usually liver) homogenate by centrifuging at 9000 g for 20 minutes in a suitable medium; this fraction contains cytosol and microsomes." The S9 fraction consists of two components: the microsomes component which incorporates cytochrome P450 isoforms (phase I metabolism) and the cytosolic component which contains transferases (phase II metabolism). A mixture of four active endo-isomers of NRB (U, V, W en Y) formed four major metabolites in rat liver S9 and cytosolic preparations after incubation. The isomers are separately not pure compounds, but research with pure V isomer and a mixture of U and V isomers pointed out that each isomer undergoes metabolism to be formed into a single product in rat. Mass spectrometry confirmed that all metabolites had a mass consistent with a hydroxylated metabolite of NRB. Because female rats are more sensitive to NRB than the male species, the level of metabolites are higher in females than in males. The same metabolites were found in guinea pigs, although the levels of metabolism in these rodents are considerately lower compared to those in rats. In mice two metabolites were detected: one metabolite of the V isomer (V1) which was also found in the rat preparations and another, new metabolite of the V isomer (V2). (Figure 7.1) These data acknowledge the link between the susceptibility to NRB and the production of different types and different levels of metabolites.

=== In vivo experiment ===
After collecting blood from rats 10 and 30 minutes after oral administration, plasma and red blood cell fractions were analyzed in search for either parent compounds or hydroxylated metabolites. However, neither were found, which either means that the absorption did not take place or the compounds underwent a quick clearance from the body. Whole blood samples certainly showed traces of the parent compound and a metabolite (M3) with molecular mass of 226, in samples from both female and male rats. The level in which this metabolite occurred, appeared to be once again higher in the female rats than in the male species. M3 was not found in any other rat or mouse tissue. This suggests that M3 may be formed by gut microflora in rats. After NRB had orally been administered, an examination of both rat and mouse liver revealed traces of the parent compound. Comparing the metabolite levels in both sexes and species, a significantly higher amount was discovered in the female rats than in the male rats or the mice. HPLC chromatograms liver preparations from female of and male rats, display the detection of four metabolites (U1, V1, M1, M2). (Figure 7.2) Mass spectrometry had been used to identify these and easily so, because the hydroxylated metabolites were +16 amu higher than NRB. These studies confirmed that the metabolites were identical to those found in the in vitro preparations. The metabolites were not found in mouse liver preparations. Moreover, neither NRB parent compound nor its metabolites were discovered in the heart after oral administration in rats as well as mice. This lack of detectable metabolites implies that NRB is able to induce a lethal effect at extremely low levels.

== Adverse effects & effects on animals ==
=== Adverse effects ===
The effects of norbormide are caused by the endo-isomers, but the exo-isomers R, T and X showed no contractile effects on the rat arterio smooth muscle. There was only a relaxing effect on the muscle. In animal studies of Rozkowksi, he showed that the effects that are caused by NRB are irreversible. Another study has shown that there were respiratory depressions after the cardiovascular effects in the rats which were treated with norbormide in vivo.

=== Effects on animals ===
NRB is specifically toxic to rats, but it's relatively harmless to other rodents and mammals. In all animals tested and also in the rat aorta and extravascular smooth muscle tissue, NRB exhibits vasorelaxant properties in the arteries. Another effect of NRB is stimulation of corticosterone and aldosterone production in both rat and mice adrenal gland by enhancing late steps of steroid-hormone synthesis.

== Toxicity ==
The unique toxicity of NRB has been determined by performing animal experiments by using several species of rodents. The toxic dose was orally administered. In the table the defined LD50 data illustrate the compound's specific toxicity. Rats, particularly the female species, experience even after administration of a small amount of NRB the effects of the toxin. NRB is toxic to guinea pigs and mouse either, but to a lesser extent. There is no reliable information available about LD50 values in humans. Although NRB is a rodenticide, and especially toxic for brown rats, human beings could be exposed to NRB through inhalation and dermal contact.

Exposure Acute toxic level Oral LD50 (mg/kg)

- Rat (male) 15
- Rat (female) 5
- Guinea pig 620
- Mouse 2250

=== Acute toxicity studies in rats ===
A lethal dose of NRB to rats causes behavioural changes which look a lot like the signs associated to cyanide toxicity. The first indications of the NRB toxicity present themselves about ten minutes after administration. At first the rats start showing signs of increased motor activity and incoordination. Subsequently, the rats' hind extremities weaken and become ashen. Their breathing begins to be laboured and within a short period of time the rats suffer from series of convulsive movements. The spasm is followed by death, which occurs within 30 minutes in albino laboratory rats and with two hours in wild animals. After examining isolated rat hearts in Langendorff preparations, a frequent in vitro technique, NRB also turned out to cause severe species-selective toxic effects on rat heart. 2-10 μg NRB had been injected into the coronary vessel which resulted in a reduction of blood flow, attended with decreased cardiac contraction and a decreased heart rate. The rat hearts started beating quite irregularly. These irreversible effects weren't marked in the heart muscle (myocardium) as perhaps expected, but straight in the coronary arteries. Additionally, it was confirmed that rats which were subjected to NRB treatment suffered from hyperventilation followed by cardiovascular effects. Recent studies present NRB's ability to activate the mitochondrial permeability transition pore (MPTP) in isolated rat preparations. Cell apoptosis and necrosis are (amongst other things) regulated by MPT pores. It is understandable that such an abnormity in the mitochondrial membranes bring about issues in the cellular metabolism of the poisoned animal.

=== Toxicity studies in mammals and birds ===
The members of the genus Rattus are highly sensitive to NRB, but other animals experience no toxic effects. Upon closer examination a 1000 mg/kg dose of norbormide didn't bring forth any toxic signs when orally administered to cats, chickens, dogs, monkeys, mice, swine or birds. This has been confirmed in the table below. So it is safe to say that NRB is relatively harmless to nonrat species.
