= Thallous malonate =

Names
- IUPAC name Dithallium(I) malonate
- Systematic IUPAC name Dithallium(I) propanedioate
- Other names Dithallium Malonate, (Propanedioic Acid, Dithallium Salt), (Malonic Acid, Thallium Salt (1:2)), Formomalenic Thallium

Identifiers
CAS Number	2757-18-8
3D model (JSmol)	Interactive image
ChemSpider	16719
ECHA InfoCard	100.018.559
EC Number	220-414-7
PubChem CID	16684457
UNII	Y2JPM0IF0R
CompTox Dashboard (EPA)	DTXSID1062627
- InChI: InChI=1S/C3H4O4.2Tl/c4-2(5)1-3(6)7;;/h1H2,(H,4,5)(H,6,7);;/q;2*+1/p-2 Key: UFVDXEXHBVQKGB-UHFFFAOYSA-L; InChI=1S/C3H4O4.2Tl/c4-2(5)1-3(6)7;;/h1H2,(H,4,5)(H,6,7);;/q;2*+1/p-2
- SMILES: [Tl+].[Tl+].[O-]C(=O)CC([O-])=O

Properties
Chemical formula	C_{3}H_{2}O_{4}Tl_{2}
Molar mass	510.812 g/mol

Hazards
- GHS labelling
Pictograms	(GHS06: Toxic) (GHS08: Health hazard) (GHS09: Environmental hazard)
Signal word	Danger
NFPA 704 (fire diamond)	3 0 0
Safety data sheet (SDS)	MSDS
- Except where otherwise noted, data are given for materials in their standard state (at 25 °C [77 °F], 100 kPa). verify (what is ?) Infobox references

Thallous malonate is a chemical compound composed mainly of Thallium. It is an extremely hazardous substance and is on the List of extremely hazardous substances.
