= (2-Chlorophenyl)thiourea =

Names
- Preferred IUPAC name N-(2-Chlorophenyl)thiourea
- Other names 1-(2-Chlorophenyl)thiourea (o-Chlorophenyl)thiourea

Identifiers
CAS Number	5344-82-1
3D model (JSmol)	Interactive image
ChemSpider	644204
ECHA InfoCard	100.023.901
PubChem CID	737139
UNII	NEP40W9Y41
CompTox Dashboard (EPA)	DTXSID4063799
- InChI: InChI=1S/C7H7ClN2S/c8-5-3-1-2-4-6(5)10-7(9)11/h1-4H,(H3,9,10,11) Key: YZUKKTCDYSIWKJ-UHFFFAOYSA-N; InChI=1/C7H7ClN2S/c8-5-3-1-2-4-6(5)10-7(9)11/h1-4H,(H3,9,10,11) Key: YZUKKTCDYSIWKJ-UHFFFAOYAH
- SMILES: Clc1ccccc1NC(=S)N

Properties
Chemical formula	C_{7}H_{7}ClN_{2}S
Molar mass	186.66 g·mol^{−1}
Melting point	146 °C (295 °F; 419 K)
- Except where otherwise noted, data are given for materials in their standard state (at 25 °C [77 °F], 100 kPa). Infobox references

(2-Chlorophenyl)thiourea is a chemical compound used as an herbicide. As of 1998, the Environmental Protection Agency did not have it registered as a pesticide in the United States.
