= Trichloro(dichlorophenyl)silane =

Identifiers
CAS Number	27137-85-5
3D model (JSmol)	3,4: Interactive image
ChemSpider	3,4: 3763800
ECHA InfoCard	100.043.853
EC Number	248-254-3
PubChem CID	3,4: 4570824
UN number	UN2987 (Chlorosilanes)
CompTox Dashboard (EPA)	DTXSID70893082
- InChI: 3,4: InChI=1S/C6H3Cl5Si/c7-5-2-1-4(3-6(5)8)12(9,10)11/h1-3H Key: SUIOPANHTSHMHP-UHFFFAOYSA-N
- SMILES: 3,4: C1=CC(=C(C=C1[Si](Cl)(Cl)Cl)Cl)Cl

Properties
Chemical formula	SiC_{6}H_{3}Cl_{5}
Molar mass	280.4370 g/mol
Density	1.562 g/cm^{3}
Boiling point	260 °C (500 °F; 533 K)

Hazards
- GHS labelling
Pictograms	(GHS05: Corrosive)
Signal word	Danger
- Except where otherwise noted, data are given for materials in their standard state (at 25 °C [77 °F], 100 kPa). verify (what is ?) Infobox references

Trichloro(dichlorophenyl)silane is a family of chemical compounds, all with formula Si(C_{6}H_{3}Cl_{2})Cl_{3}. It is used as an intermediate in the manufacture of silicones.

== See also ==
- Organosilicon#Silyl halides
