= Trichloronate =

Names
- Preferred IUPAC name O-Ethyl O-(2,4,5-trichlorophenyl) ethylphosphonothioate

Identifiers
CAS Number	327-98-0
3D model (JSmol)	Interactive image
ChemSpider	9105
ECHA InfoCard	100.005.752
PubChem CID	9477
UNII	55228MJ5QM
CompTox Dashboard (EPA)	DTXSID9038420
- InChI: InChI=1S/C10H12Cl3O2PS/c1-3-14-16(17,4-2)15-10-6-8(12)7(11)5-9(10)13/h5-6H,3-4H2,1-2H3 Key: ANIAQSUBRGXWLS-UHFFFAOYSA-N; InChI=1/C10H12Cl3O2PS/c1-3-14-16(17,4-2)15-10-6-8(12)7(11)5-9(10)13/h5-6H,3-4H2,1-2H3 Key: ANIAQSUBRGXWLS-UHFFFAOYAG
- SMILES: Clc1cc(OP(=S)(OCC)CC)c(Cl)cc1Cl

Properties
Chemical formula	C_{10}H_{12}Cl_{3}O_{2}PS
Molar mass	333.59 g·mol^{−1}
Appearance	Amber colored odorless liquid
- Except where otherwise noted, data are given for materials in their standard state (at 25 °C [77 °F], 100 kPa). Infobox references

Trichloronate is a highly toxic organophosphate insecticide. It is used against vegetable fly larvae and soil pests.

Case reports indicate exposure to the chemical can cause fatal encephalopathy. Its aquatic toxicity has been measured at significantly higher against Ceriodaphnia dubia and Daphnia magna.
