= Fluoroacetyl chloride =

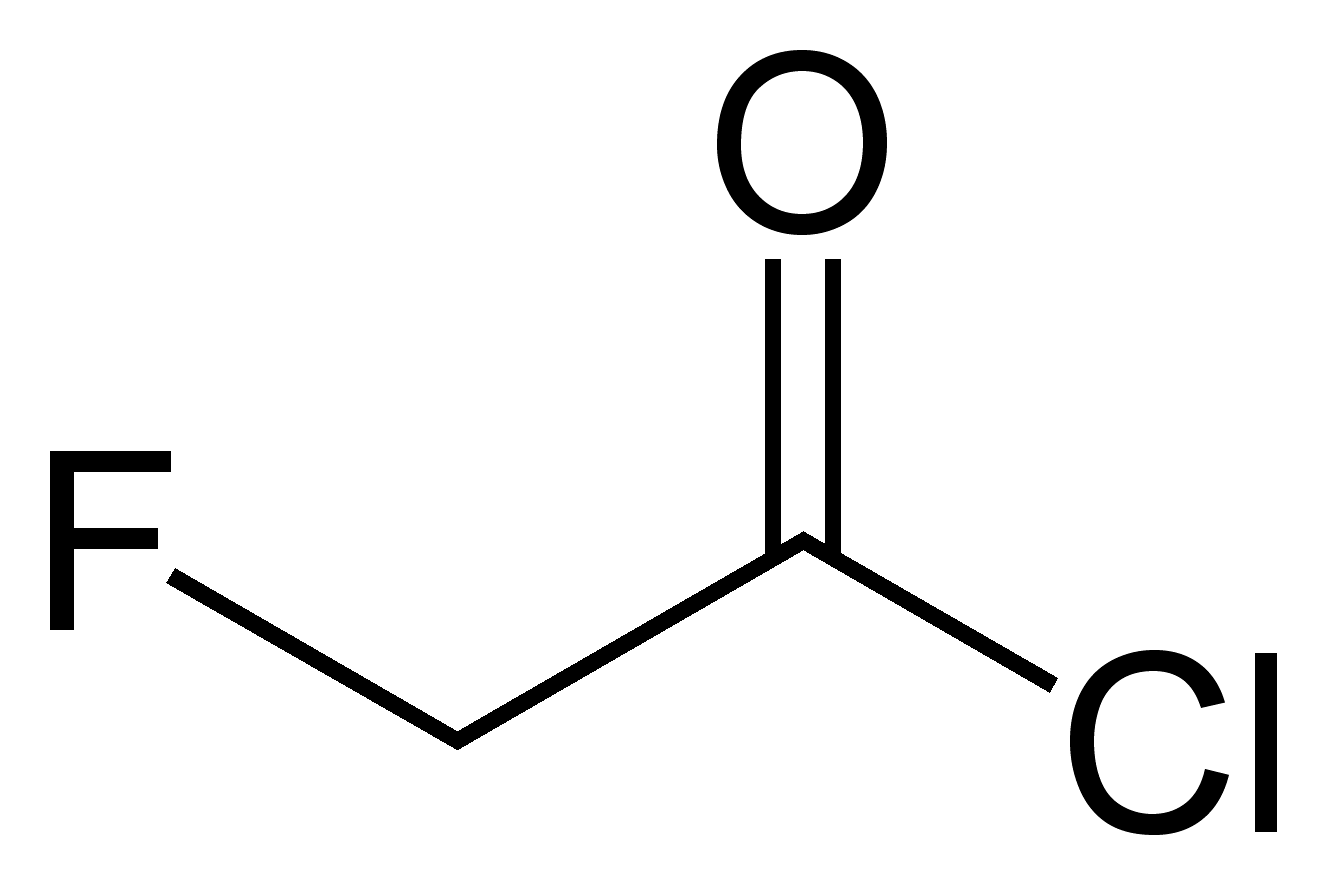
Skeletal formula
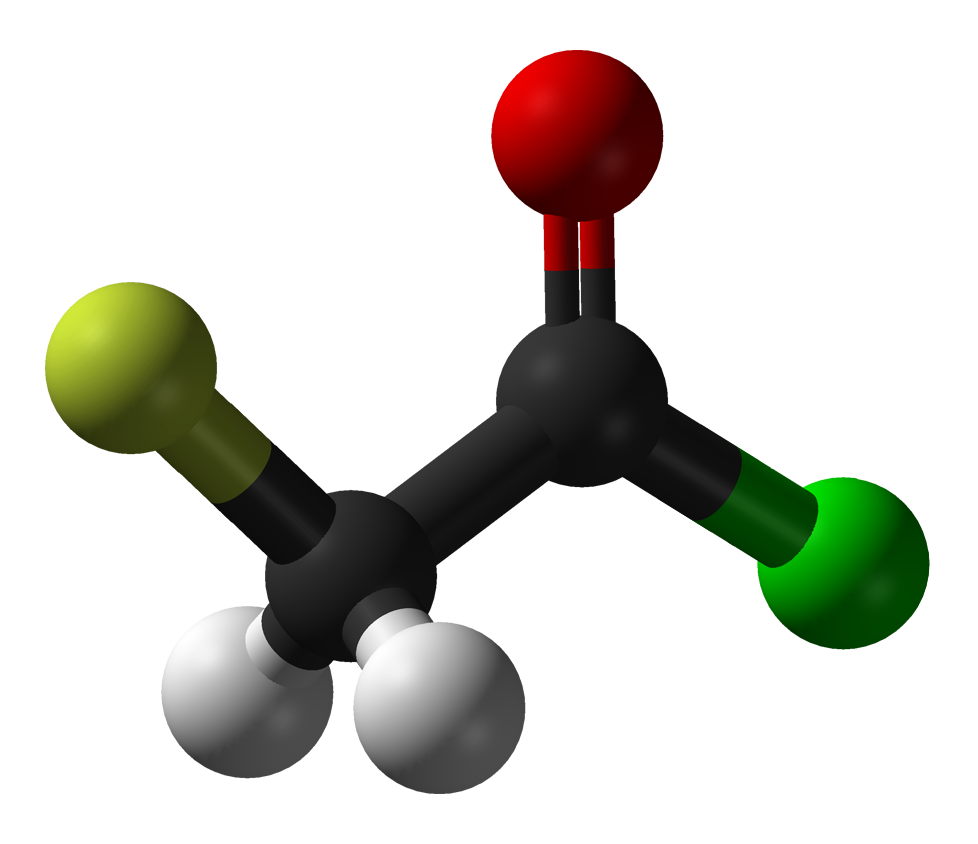
Ball-and-stick model

Names
- Preferred IUPAC name Fluoroacetyl chloride
- Other names 2-Fluoroacetyl chloride Fluoroethanoyl chloride

Identifiers
CAS Number	359-06-8 =
3D model (JSmol)	Interactive image
ChemSpider	9282
ECHA InfoCard	100.006.022
PubChem CID	9663
UNII	0CQX1ANG4H
CompTox Dashboard (EPA)	DTXSID4059885
- InChI: InChI=1S/C2H2ClFO/c3-2(5)1-4/h1H2 Key: ZBHDTYQJAQDBIH-UHFFFAOYSA-N; InChI=1/C2H2ClFO/c3-2(5)1-4/h1H2 Key: ZBHDTYQJAQDBIH-UHFFFAOYAI
- SMILES: FCC(Cl)=O

Properties
Chemical formula	C_{2}H_{2}ClFO
Molar mass	96.49 g·mol^{−1}
Boiling point	70 to 71 °C (158 to 160 °F; 343 to 344 K) at 755 mmHg

Hazards
NFPA 704 (fire diamond)	4 1 2
- Except where otherwise noted, data are given for materials in their standard state (at 25 °C [77 °F], 100 kPa). verify (what is ?) Infobox references

Fluoroacetyl chloride is an acyl chloride.

In 1948, William E. Truce of Purdue University described a synthesis of fluoroacetyl chloride which was undertaken "because of its potential value for introducing the group, —COCH_{2}F, into organic molecules." In this synthesis, he reacted sodium fluoroacetate with phosphorus pentachloride to obtain the desired compound.

== See also ==
- Fluoroacetic acid
- Methyl fluoroacetate
