= Methoxyethylmercuric acetate =

Names
- IUPAC names acetyloxy(2-methoxyethyl)mercury (Acetato-κO)(2-methoxyethyl)mercury
- Systematic IUPAC name (Acetato-kappaO)(2-methoxyethyl)mercury
- Other names 2-methoxyethylmercury acetate Mercury, (acetato-κO)(2-methoxyethyl)- [ACD/Index Name] (2-Methoxyethyl)mercuric acetate (2-METHOXYETHYL)MERCURIO ACETATE (2-METHOXYETHYL)MERCURY ACETATE (Acetato-O)(2-methoxyethyl)mercury 151-38-2 [RN] 205-790-2 [EINECS] Acetato(2-methoxyethyl)mercury ACETOXY(2-METHOXYETHYL)MERCURY Methoxyethelmercuric acetate Methoxyethelmercuric acetic acid Methoxyethyl mercuric acetate METHOXYETHYLMERCURIC ACETATE methoxyethylmercury acetate

Identifiers
CAS Number	151-38-2
3D model (JSmol)	: Interactive image
ChemSpider	10413064
ECHA InfoCard	100.005.265
PubChem CID	16682936
UNII	LS4R39JWSR
UN number	2025, 2777
CompTox Dashboard (EPA)	DTXSID4058314
- InChI: InChI=1S/C3H7O.C2H4O2.Hg/c1-3-4-2;1-2(3)4;/h1,3H2,2H3;1H3,(H,3,4);/q;;+1/p-1 Key: AGJBKFAPBKOEGA-UHFFFAOYSA-M; : InChI=1S/C3H7O.C2H4O2.Hg/c1-3-4-2;1-2(3)4;/h1,3H2,2H3;1H3,(H,3,4);/q;;+1/p-1 Key: AGJBKFAPBKOEGA-UHFFFAOYSA-M
- SMILES: : CC(=O)O[Hg]CCOC

Properties
Chemical formula	C_{5}H_{10}HgO_{3}
Molar mass	318.724 g·mol^{−1}

Hazards
- Occupational safety and health (OHS/OSH)
Main hazards	mercury-containing compound
Threshold limit value (TLV)	0.01 mg/cu m (TWA), 0.03 mg/cu m (STEL)
- Lethal dose or concentration (LD, LC)
LD_{50} (median dose)	25 mg/kg (rat oral), 45 mg/kg (mouse oral)
- Except where otherwise noted, data are given for materials in their standard state (at 25 °C [77 °F], 100 kPa). Infobox references

Methoxyethylmercuric acetate is a chemical compound formerly used as a pesticide for seeds of cotton and small grains. It is highly toxic, and can pose a threat to the brain and central nervous system.
