= Methyl phenkapton =

Names
- Preferred IUPAC name S-{[(2,6-Dichlorophenyl)sulfanyl]methyl} O,O-dimethyl phosphorodithioate

Identifiers
| CAS Number | 3735-23-7 |
| 3D model (JSmol) | Interactive image |
| ChemSpider | 56293 |
| PubChem CID | 62519 |
| UNII | KZQ8324E26 |
| UN number | 2783 |
| CompTox Dashboard (EPA) | DTXSID6042153 |
- InChI: InChI=1S/C9H11Cl2O2PS3/c1-12-14(15,13-2)17-6-16-9-5-7(10)3-4-8(9)11/h3-5H,6H2,1-2H3 Key: IHCHKPCNDMQWGF-UHFFFAOYSA-N; InChI=1/C9H11Cl2O2PS3/c1-12-14(15,13-2)17-6-16-9-5-7(10)3-4-8(9)11/h3-5H,6H2,1-2H3 Key: IHCHKPCNDMQWGF-UHFFFAOYAL
- SMILES: Clc1ccc(Cl)cc1SCSP(=S)(OC)OC

Properties
| Chemical formula | C_{9}H_{11}Cl_{2}O_{2}PS_{3} |
| Molar mass | 349.24 g·mol^{−1} |
- Except where otherwise noted, data are given for materials in their standard state (at 25 °C [77 °F], 100 kPa). Infobox references

Methyl phenkapton is an organophosphorus compound. It is highly toxic.
