= Acetone thiosemicarbazone =

Chemical compound

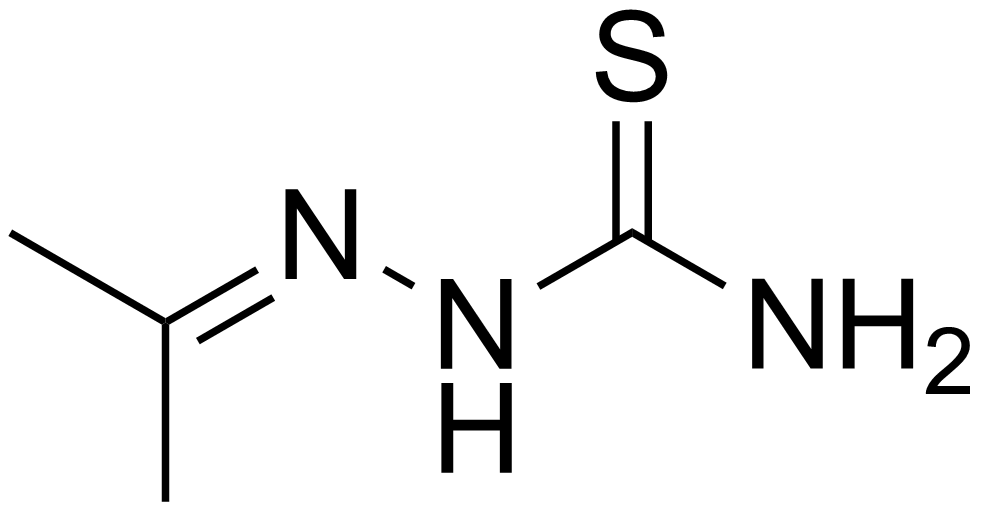

Names
- Preferred IUPAC name 2-(Propan-2-ylidene)hydrazine-1-carbothioamide
- Other names (Propan-2-ylideneamino)thiourea; Acetone thiosemicarbazide Dimethyl ketone thiosemicarbazone Thiosemicarbazone acetone NSC 711; 2-(1-Methylethylidene)hydrazinecarbothioamide

Identifiers
CAS Number	1752-30-3
3D model (JSmol)	Interactive image; Interactive image
Abbreviations	ATSC
ChEMBL	ChEMBL500557
ChemSpider	2050659
ECHA InfoCard	100.015.580
EC Number	217-137-9
PubChem CID	2770166
UNII	C3U604L47F
CompTox Dashboard (EPA)	DTXSID6044480
- InChI: InChI=1S/C4H9N3S/c1-3(2)6-7-4(5)8/h1-2H3,(H3,5,7,8) Key: FQUDPIIGGVBZEQ-UHFFFAOYSA-N; InChI=1/C4H9N3S/c1-3(2)6-7-4(5)8/h1-2H3,(H3,5,7,8) Key: FQUDPIIGGVBZEQ-UHFFFAOYAR
- SMILES: CC(=NNC(=S)N)C; S=C(N)N/N=C(\C)C

Properties
Chemical formula	C_{4}H_{9}N_{3}S
Molar mass	131.20 g·mol^{−1}
Appearance	White crystals
Density	1.19 g/cm^{3}
Melting point	172 to 175 °C (342 to 347 °F; 445 to 448 K)
Vapor pressure	0.161 mmHg at 25 °C

Hazards
- Occupational safety and health (OHS/OSH)
Main hazards	Toxic
- GHS labelling
Pictograms	(GHS06: Toxic) (GHS07: Exclamation mark)
Signal word	Danger
Hazard statements	H300, H312, H330
Precautionary statements	P260, P264, P270, P271, P280, P284, P301+P310, P302+P352, P304+P340, P310, P312, P320, P321, P330, P363, P403+P233, P405, P501
NFPA 704 (fire diamond)	4
Flash point	81.3 °C (178.3 °F; 354.4 K)
Safety data sheet (SDS)	MSDS
- Except where otherwise noted, data are given for materials in their standard state (at 25 °C [77 °F], 100 kPa). verify (what is ?) Infobox references

Acetone thiosemicarbazone is a chemical compound with the molecular formula C_{4}H_{9}N_{3}S. It is used in the plastics industry in the manufacture of polyvinyl chloride (PVC) to terminate the polymerization process.

== Toxicity ==
Acetone thiosemicarbazone is classified as an extremely hazardous substance in the United States as defined in Section 302 of the U.S. Emergency Planning and Community Right-to-Know Act (42 U.S.C. 11002), and is subject to strict reporting requirements by facilities which produce, store, or use it in significant quantities.

=== Symptoms of exposure ===
Symptoms of acute exposure to acetone thiosemicarbazide may include nausea, vomiting, eye and skin irritation, excessive salivation, pulmonary edema, hyperglycemia, and seizures.
