= Chlorbisan =

Names
- Preferred IUPAC name 2,2′-Sulfanediylbis(5-chloro-3-methylphenol)
- Other names 2,2′-Thiobis(5-chloro-3-methylphenol)

Identifiers
CAS Number	4418-66-0
3D model (JSmol)	Interactive image
ChemSpider	19275
ECHA InfoCard	100.022.349
PubChem CID	20468
UNII	Q9R857FD35
CompTox Dashboard (EPA)	DTXSID1041768
- InChI: InChI=1S/C14H12Cl2O2S/c1-7-3-9(15)5-11(17)13(7)19-14-8(2)4-10(16)6-12(14)18/h3-6,17-18H,1-2H3 Key: HQRDNJVKXWYKAR-UHFFFAOYSA-N; InChI=1/C14H12Cl2O2S/c1-7-3-9(15)5-11(17)13(7)19-14-8(2)4-10(16)6-12(14)18/h3-6,17-18H,1-2H3 Key: HQRDNJVKXWYKAR-UHFFFAOYAD
- SMILES: Clc2cc(c(Sc1c(cc(Cl)cc1O)C)c(O)c2)C

Properties
Chemical formula	C_{14}H_{12}Cl_{2}O_{2}S
Molar mass	315.21 g·mol^{−1}

Hazards
NFPA 704 (fire diamond)	4 1 0
- Except where otherwise noted, data are given for materials in their standard state (at 25 °C [77 °F], 100 kPa). Infobox references

Chlorbisan is a toxic halogenated organosulfide. It is used as a microbicide.
