= Formothion =

Names
- Preferred IUPAC name O,O-Dimethyl S-[2-(N-methylformamido)-2-oxoethyl] phosphorodithioate

Identifiers
CAS Number	2540-82-1
3D model (JSmol)	Interactive image
ChemSpider	16412
ECHA InfoCard	100.018.017
PubChem CID	17345
UNII	7O9EWV477R
CompTox Dashboard (EPA)	DTXSID4041991
- InChI: InChI=1S/C6H12NO4PS2/c1-7(5-8)6(9)4-14-12(13,10-2)11-3/h5H,4H2,1-3H3 Key: AIKKULXCBHRFOS-UHFFFAOYSA-N; InChI=1/C6H12NO4PS2/c1-7(5-8)6(9)4-14-12(13,10-2)11-3/h5H,4H2,1-3H3 Key: AIKKULXCBHRFOS-UHFFFAOYAD
- SMILES: O=C(N(C=O)C)CSP(=S)(OC)OC

Properties
Chemical formula	C_{6}H_{12}NO_{4}PS_{2}
Molar mass	257.26 g·mol^{−1}

Pharmacology
Legal status	AU: S6 (Poison)
- Except where otherwise noted, data are given for materials in their standard state (at 25 °C [77 °F], 100 kPa). Infobox references

Formothion (chemical formula: C_{6}H_{12}NO_{4}PS_{2}) is a chemical compound with obsolete uses in acaricides and insecticides.
