= Dithiazanine iodide =

Names
- IUPAC name 3-Ethyl-2-[5-(3-ethyl-2-benzothiazolinylidene)-1,3-pentadienyl]-benzothiazolium iodide
- Systematic IUPAC name 3-Ethyl-2-[(1E,3E,5Z)-5-(3-ethyl-1,3-benzothiazol-2(3H)-ylidene)penta-1,3-dien-1-yl]-1,3-benzothiazol-3-ium iodide

Identifiers
CAS Number	514-73-8
3D model (JSmol)	Interactive image
Beilstein Reference	3838938
ChEBI	CHEBI:228275
ChEMBL	ChEMBL421701
ChemSpider	4642986
ECHA InfoCard	100.007.443
EC Number	208-186-7
KEGG	C18391
PubChem CID	5702697
UNII	8OEC3RA07X
UN number	2811
CompTox Dashboard (EPA)	DTXSID8022955
- InChI: InChI=1S/C23H23N2S2.HI/c1-3-24-18-12-8-10-14-20(18)26-22(24)16-6-5-7-17-23-25(4-2)19-13-9-11-15-21(19)27-23;/h5-17H,3-4H2,1-2H3;1H/q+1;/p-1 Key: MNQDKWZEUULFPX-UHFFFAOYSA-M
- SMILES: [I-].S\1c4ccccc4N(C/1=C\C=C\C=C\c3sc2ccccc2[n+]3CC)CC

Properties
Chemical formula	C_{23}H_{23}IN_{2}S_{2}
Molar mass	518.48 g·mol^{−1}
Appearance	Green crystals
Melting point	Decomposes at 478.4 °F (248.0 °C)

Hazards
- GHS labelling
Pictograms	(GHS06: Toxic) (GHS07: Exclamation mark)
Signal word	Danger
Hazard statements	H300, H315, H319, H335
Precautionary statements	P261, P264, P270, P271, P280, P301+P310, P302+P352, P304+P340, P305+P351+P338, P312, P321, P330, P332+P313, P337+P313, P362, P403+P233, P405, P501
- Except where otherwise noted, data are given for materials in their standard state (at 25 °C [77 °F], 100 kPa). Infobox references

Dithiazanine iodide is a chemical compound belonging to the group of polymethine dyes. It is used as a veterinary anthelmintic for dogs. It is a highly toxic chemical, with a lethal dose for humans of about 4–16 mg/kg by oral ingestion. The mechanism of toxicity is not well known but it is believed that this chemical interferes with cells' absorption of glucose, which is essential to obtain energy through cell respiration.
