= Trichloro(chloromethyl)silane =

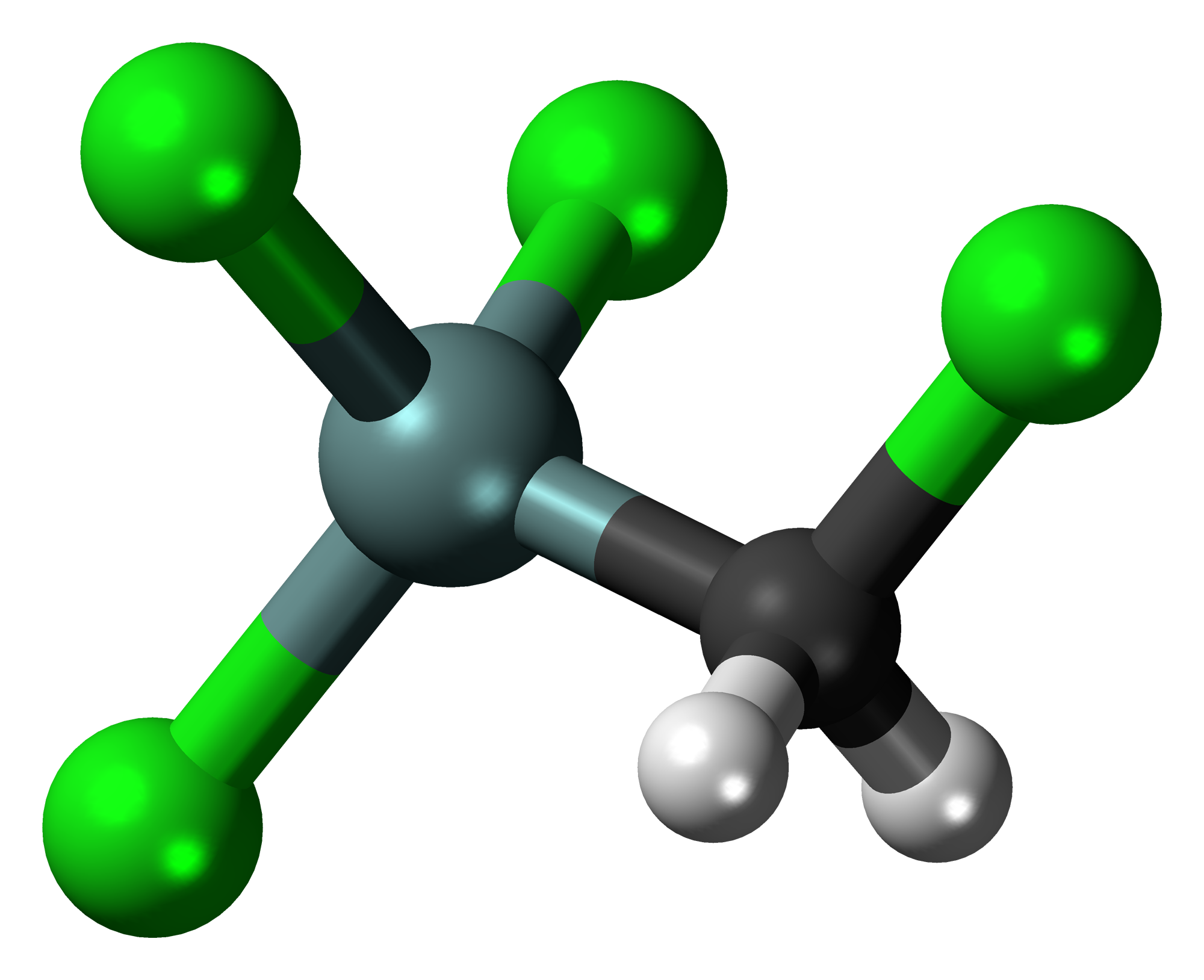

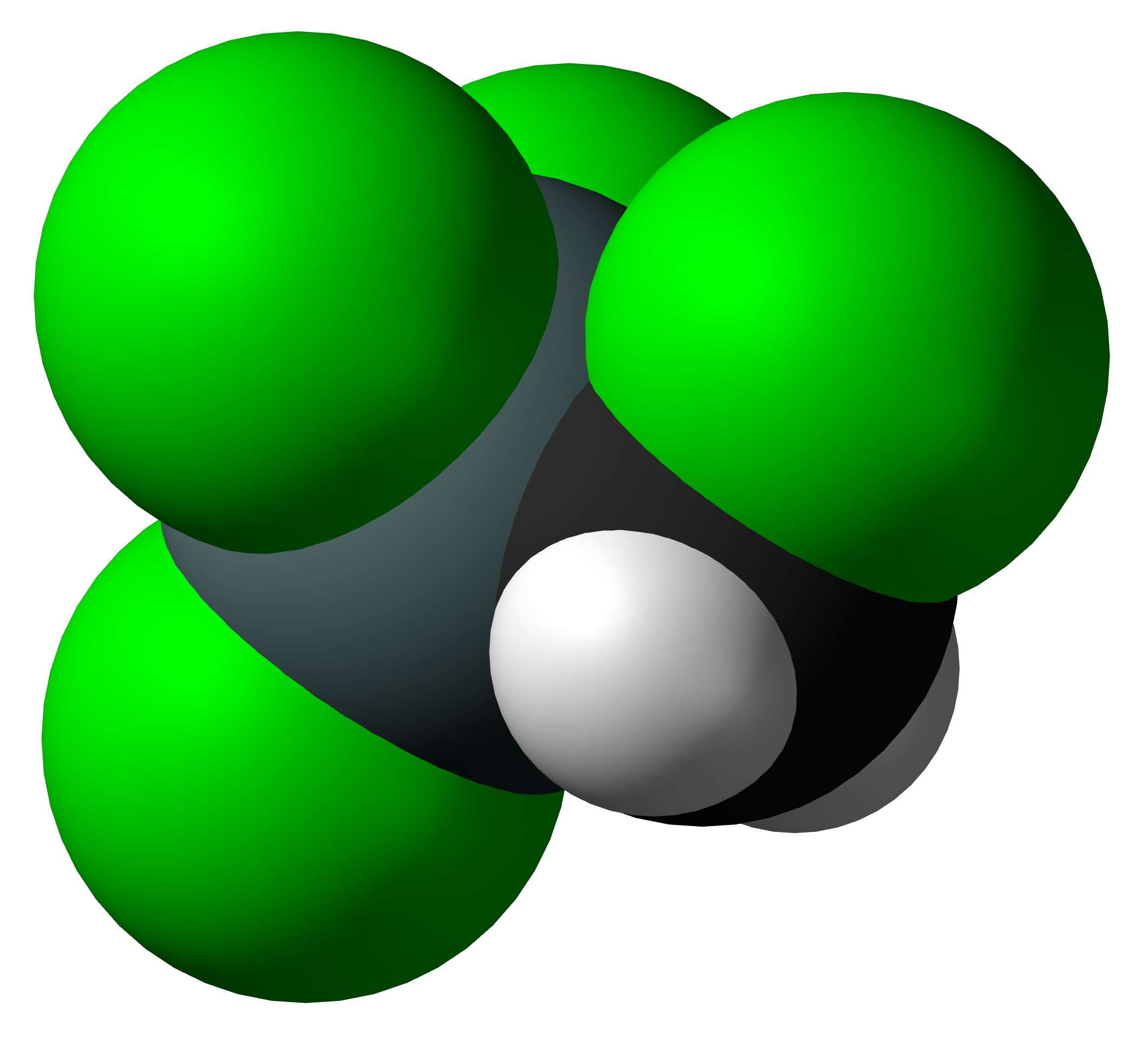

Names
- Preferred IUPAC name Trichloro(chloromethyl)silane
- Other names (Chloromethyl)trichlorosilane

Identifiers
CAS Number	1558-25-4
3D model (JSmol)	Interactive image
Beilstein Reference	1811640
ChemSpider	14523
ECHA InfoCard	100.014.834
EC Number	216-316-9
PubChem CID	15258
RTECS number	VV2200000
UNII	03TZM169KH
UN number	3389
CompTox Dashboard (EPA)	DTXSID2061779
- InChI: InChI=1S/CH2Cl4Si/c2-1-6(3,4)5/h1H2 Key: FYTPGBJPTDQJCG-UHFFFAOYSA-N
- SMILES: ClC[Si](Cl)(Cl)Cl

Properties
Chemical formula	CH_{2}Cl_{4}Si
Molar mass	183.91 g·mol^{−1}
Appearance	colorless liquid
Boiling point	118 °C (244 °F; 391 K)
Solubility in water	Reacts with water
Solubility	Reacts with alcohols Soluble in chloroform, benzene, THF

Hazards
- Occupational safety and health (OHS/OSH)
Main hazards	Highly flammable, hydrolyzes to release HCl
- Except where otherwise noted, data are given for materials in their standard state (at 25 °C [77 °F], 100 kPa). Infobox references

Trichloro(chloromethyl)silane is a compound with formula Si(CH_{2}Cl)Cl_{3}.

== See also ==
- Organosilicon#Silyl_halides
