= 1,4-Cyclohexanedicarboxylic acid =

Names
- Preferred IUPAC name Cyclohexane-1,4-dicarboxylic acid

Identifiers
CAS Number	cis: 619-81-8; trans: 619-82-9; mix: 1076-97-7
3D model (JSmol)	Interactive image; cis: Interactive image; trans: Interactive image
ChEBI	CHEBI:145052
ChEMBL	ChEMBL3187151
ChemSpider	13484
ECHA InfoCard	100.012.790
EC Number	214-068-6; trans: 210-614-2
PubChem CID	14106
UNII	cis: 68QED0R44U; trans: 18W55738KH
CompTox Dashboard (EPA)	DTXSID2038788; cis: DTXSID001290604; trans: DTXSID901031536
- InChI: InChI=1S/C8H12O4/c9-7(10)5-1-2-6(4-3-5)8(11)12/h5-6H,1-4H2,(H,9,10)(H,11,12) Key: PXGZQGDTEZPERC-UHFFFAOYSA-N; cis: InChI=1S/C8H12O4/c9-7(10)5-1-2-6(4-3-5)8(11)12/h5-6H,1-4H2,(H,9,10)(H,11,12)/t5-,6+ Key: PXGZQGDTEZPERC-OLQVQODUSA-N; trans: InChI=1S/C8H12O4/c9-7(10)5-1-2-6(4-3-5)8(11)12/h5-6H,1-4H2,(H,9,10)(H,11,12)/t5-,6- Key: PXGZQGDTEZPERC-IZLXSQMJSA-N
- SMILES: C1CC(CCC1C(=O)O)C(=O)O; cis: OC(=O)[C@H]1CC[C@H](CC1)C(O)=O; trans: OC(=O)[C@H]1CC[C@@H](CC1)C(O)=O

Properties
Chemical formula	C_{8}H_{12}O_{4}
Molar mass	172.180 g·mol^{−1}
Appearance	white solid
Density	1.36 g/cm^{3}
Melting point	312.5 °C (594.5 °F; 585.6 K) 168-170°C for cis isomer
- Except where otherwise noted, data are given for materials in their standard state (at 25 °C [77 °F], 100 kPa). Infobox references

1,4-Cyclohexanedicarboxylic acid describes a pair of organic compounds with the formula C_{6}H_{10}(CO_{2}H)_{2}. The CO_{2}H groups are attached to the opposite carbon centers of the cyclohexane ring. These groups can be cis or trans. Other isomers of cyclohexanedicarboxylic acid are known, but the 1,4- isomers are of greatest interest, perhaps because they are obtainable from a commodity chemical. Specifically, hydrogenation of terephthalic acid affords the title compound:

C_{6}H_{4}(CO_{2}H)_{2} + 3 H_{2} → C_{6}H_{10}(CO_{2}H)_{2}.

The trans isomer has been more heavily studied. It has been examined as a precursor to polycarbonates and as a building block for metal-organic frameworks.
