= Cadmium stearate =

Names
- IUPAC name Cadmium dioctadecanoate
- Other names Cadmium distearate; Cadmium(II) stearate; Cadmium(II) dioctadecanoate

Identifiers
CAS Number	2223-93-0
3D model (JSmol)	Interactive image
ChemSpider	15818
ECHA InfoCard	100.017.040
EC Number	218-743-6
PubChem CID	16681
UNII	GBI2ILV46J
CompTox Dashboard (EPA)	DTXSID30890557
- InChI: InChI=1S/2C18H36O2.Cd/c2*1-2-3-4-5-6-7-8-9-10-11-12-13-14-15-16-17-18(19)20;/h2*2-17H2,1H3,(H,19,20);/q;;+2/p-2
- SMILES: [Cd+2].[O-]C(=O)CCCCCCCCCCCCCCCCC.[O-]C(=O)CCCCCCCCCCCCCCCCC

Properties
Chemical formula	C_{36}H_{70}CdO_{4}
Molar mass	679.366 g·mol^{−1}
Appearance	White powder
Density	1.80 g/cm^{3}
Melting point	134 °C (273 °F; 407 K)

Hazards
NFPA 704 (fire diamond)	4 0 0
- NIOSH (US health exposure limits)
PEL (Permissible)	[1910.1027] TWA 0.005 mg/m^{3} (as Cd)
REL (Recommended)	Ca
IDLH (Immediate danger)	Ca [9 mg/m^{3} (as Cd)]
- Except where otherwise noted, data are given for materials in their standard state (at 25 °C [77 °F], 100 kPa). Infobox references

Cadmium stearate is a salt with the formula Cd(O_{2}CC_{17}H_{35})_{2}. Classified as a metallic soap, this a white solid is used as a lubricant and as a heat- and light-stabilizer in polyvinyl chloride. The use of cadmium stearate is being phased out because of its toxicity.

== Synthesis ==
The compound is produced by the reaction of cadmium chloride with sodium stearate or heating stearic acid and cadmium oxide or hydroxide. Also, an exchange reaction between cadmium sulfate and sodium stearate:

CdSO_{4} + 2 NaC_{18}H_{35}O_{2} → Cd(C_{18}H_{35}O_{2})_{2}↓ + Na_{2}SO_{4}

== Safety ==
Like other cadmium compounds, cadmium stearate is toxic. Cadmium stearate is also a carcinogen.
