= 2-Chloroethanesulfonyl chloride =

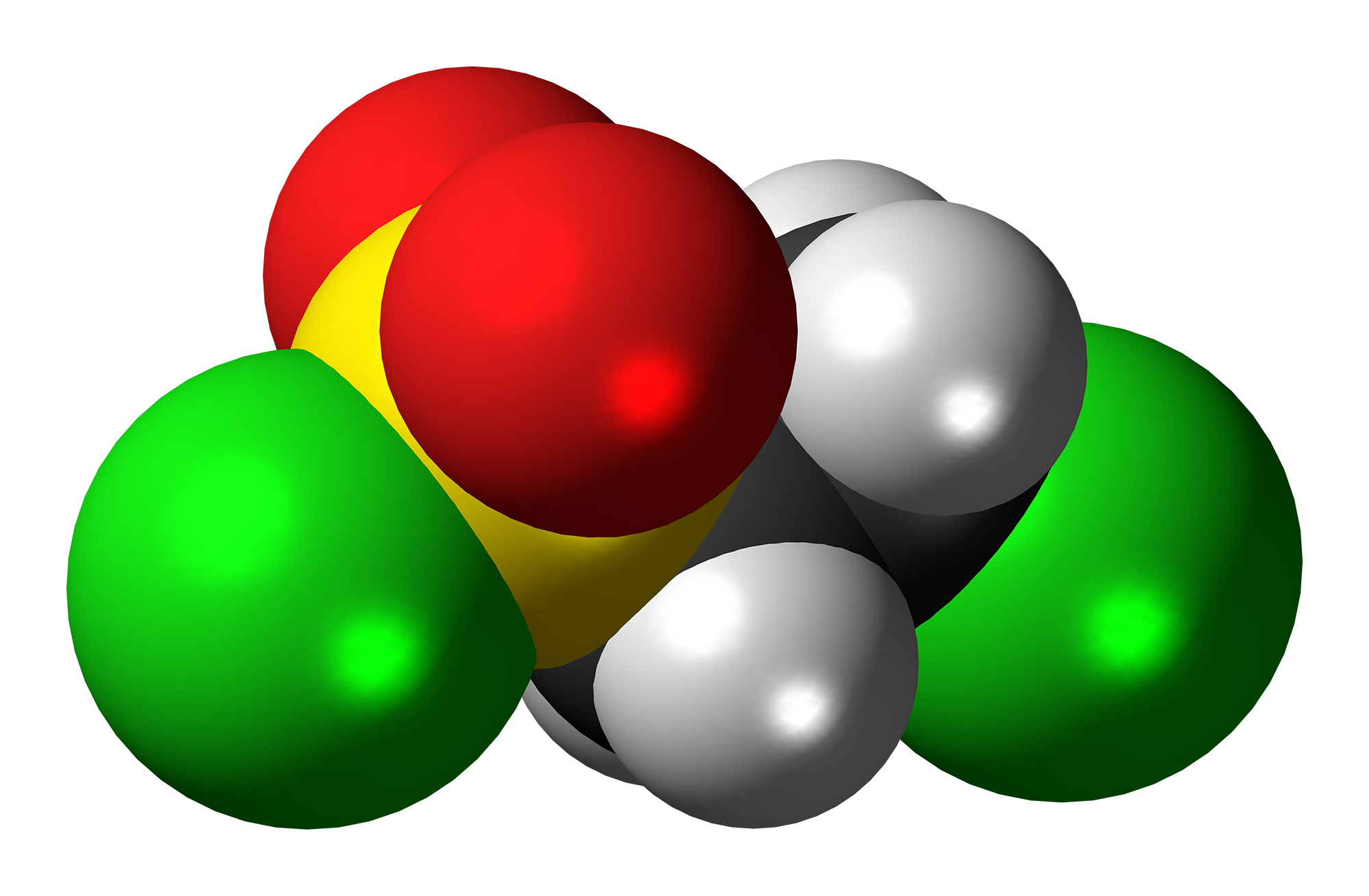

Names
- Preferred IUPAC name 2-Chloroethane-1-sulfonyl chloride
- Other names Ethanesulfonyl chloride, 2-chloro-; 2-Chloroethane sulfochloride

Identifiers
CAS Number	1622-32-8
3D model (JSmol)	Interactive image
ChemSpider	14644
ECHA InfoCard	100.015.086
PubChem CID	15385
UNII	AET6VQ5A3Q
CompTox Dashboard (EPA)	DTXSID5061825
- InChI: InChI=1S/C2H4Cl2O2S/c3-1-2-7(4,5)6/h1-2H2 Key: VHCSBTPOPKFYIU-UHFFFAOYSA-N; InChI=1/C2H4Cl2O2S/c3-1-2-7(4,5)6/h1-2H2 Key: VHCSBTPOPKFYIU-UHFFFAOYAU
- SMILES: C(CCl)S(=O)(=O)Cl

Properties
Chemical formula	C_{2}H_{4}Cl_{2}O_{2}S
Molar mass	163.03 g/mol
- Except where otherwise noted, data are given for materials in their standard state (at 25 °C [77 °F], 100 kPa). Infobox references

2-Chloroethanesulfonyl chloride is a chemical compound used in the making of other chemicals. It is a severe skin and eye irritant, and can also cause irritation to the nose, throat and lungs when inhaled.
