= Trichloroethylsilane =

Names
- Preferred IUPAC name Trichloro(ethyl)silane

Identifiers
CAS Number	115–21–9
3D model (JSmol)	Interactive image
ChemSpider	7962
ECHA InfoCard	100.003.702
PubChem CID	8260
UNII	6Q81CH0W5Z
CompTox Dashboard (EPA)	DTXSID7026940
- InChI: InChI=1S/C2H5Cl3Si/c1-2-6(3,4)5/h2H2,1H3 Key: ZOYFEXPFPVDYIS-UHFFFAOYSA-N
- SMILES: CC[Si](Cl)(Cl)Cl

Properties
Chemical formula	C_{2}H_{5}Cl_{3}Si
Molar mass	163.50 g·mol^{−1}
- Except where otherwise noted, data are given for materials in their standard state (at 25 °C [77 °F], 100 kPa). verify (what is ?) Infobox references

Trichloroethylsilane is a compound with formula Si(C_{2}H_{5})Cl_{3}.

Trichloroethylsilane appears as a colorless fuming liquid with a pungent odor. The compound is highly flammable, corrosive, acutely toxic, and acts as an irritant. It is denser than water, with its vapors being denser than air. The compound has a flash point of 57 °F (14 °C); and a boiling point of 211.1 °F (99.5 °C).

It is used as a specialized reagent in industrial and academic laboratories. It is also used as a predecessor to synthesize other organosilicon compounds and silicon-based polymers.
