= Dialifor =

Names
- IUPAC name 2-(2-chloro-1-diethoxyphosphinothioylsulfanylethyl)isoindole-1,3-dione
- Other names Dialifos; Dialiphor; Dialiphos; Torak; Hercules 14503; Caswell No. 280A

Identifiers
CAS Number	10311-84-9
3D model (JSmol)	Interactive image; Interactive image
ChemSpider	23490
ECHA InfoCard	100.030.614
PubChem CID	25146
UNII	8480K0VB4E
CompTox Dashboard (EPA)	DTXSID0037522
- InChI: InChI=1S/C14H17ClNO4PS2/c1-3-19-21(22,20-4-2)23-12(9-15)16-13(17)10-7-5-6-8-11(10)14(16)18/h5-8,12H,3-4,9H2,1-2H3 Key: MUMQYXACQUZOFP-UHFFFAOYSA-N; InChI=1/C14H17ClNO4PS2/c1-3-19-21(22,20-4-2)23-12(9-15)16-13(17)10-7-5-6-8-11(10)14(16)18/h5-8,12H,3-4,9H2,1-2H3 Key: MUMQYXACQUZOFP-UHFFFAOYAR
- SMILES: ClCC(SP(=S)(OCC)OCC)N2C(=O)c1ccccc1C2=O; CCOP(=S)(OCC)SC(CCl)N1C(=O)C2=CC=CC=C2C1=O

Properties
Chemical formula	C_{14}H_{17}ClNO_{4}PS_{2}
Molar mass	393.85 g/mol
- Except where otherwise noted, data are given for materials in their standard state (at 25 °C [77 °F], 100 kPa). Infobox references

Dialifor (Torak) is an organophosphate pesticide. It is extremely poisonous.

Dialifor (2 stereoisomers)
(S)-configuration	(R)-configuration
