= 3-Chloropropyl octyl sulfoxide =

Names
- Preferred IUPAC name 1-(3-Chloropropane-1-sulfinyl)octane
- Other names Sulfoxide, 3-chloropropyl octyl Repellent 1207

Identifiers
| CAS Number | 3569-57-1 |
| 3D model (JSmol) | Interactive image |
| ChemSpider | 18045 |
| PubChem CID | 19124 |
| UNII | 010IDO6ICK |
| CompTox Dashboard (EPA) | DTXSID5041483 |
- InChI: InChI=1S/C11H23ClOS/c1-2-3-4-5-6-7-10-14(13)11-8-9-12/h2-11H2,1H3 Key: WQZLBRKHBCTDOZ-UHFFFAOYSA-N
- SMILES: ClCCCS(=O)CCCCCCCC

Properties
| Chemical formula | C_{11}H_{23}ClOS |
| Molar mass | 238.81 g·mol^{−1} |
- Except where otherwise noted, data are given for materials in their standard state (at 25 °C [77 °F], 100 kPa). Infobox references

3-Chloropropyl octyl sulfoxide is a chemical compound. It is highly toxic and can cause injury or death upon inhalation, ingestion, or skin exposure.
