= Phosfolan =

Names
- IUPAC name Diethyl 1,3-dithiolan-2-ylidenephosphoramidate
- Other names Cyclan; N-diethoxyphosphoryl-1,3-dithiolan-2-imine

Identifiers
CAS Number	947-02-4
3D model (JSmol)	Interactive image
ChEBI	CHEBI:82145
ChemSpider	13098
ECHA InfoCard	100.012.203
EC Number	213-423-2
KEGG	C19011
PubChem CID	13689
UNII	CHJ98J84AY
UN number	2783
CompTox Dashboard (EPA)	DTXSID1042285
- InChI: InChI=1S/C7H14NO3PS2/c1-3-10-12(9,11-4-2)8-7-13-5-6-14-7/h3-6H2,1-2H3 Key: ILBONRFSLATCRE-UHFFFAOYSA-N; InChI=1/C7H14NO3PS2/c1-3-10-12(9,11-4-2)8-7-13-5-6-14-7/h3-6H2,1-2H3 Key: ILBONRFSLATCRE-UHFFFAOYAJ
- SMILES: O=P(OCC)(/N=C1\SCCS1)OCC

Properties
Chemical formula	C_{7}H_{14}NO_{3}PS_{2}
Molar mass	255.29 g·mol^{−1}

Hazards
- GHS labelling
Pictograms	(GHS06: Toxic)
Signal word	Danger
Hazard statements	H300, H310
Precautionary statements	P262, P264, P270, P280, P301+P310, P302+P350, P310, P321, P322, P330, P361, P363, P405, P501
- Except where otherwise noted, data are given for materials in their standard state (at 25 °C [77 °F], 100 kPa). Infobox references

Phosfolan (chemical formula: C_{7}H_{14}NO_{3}PS_{2}) is a chemical compound used as an insecticide.
