= Nitrocyclohexane =

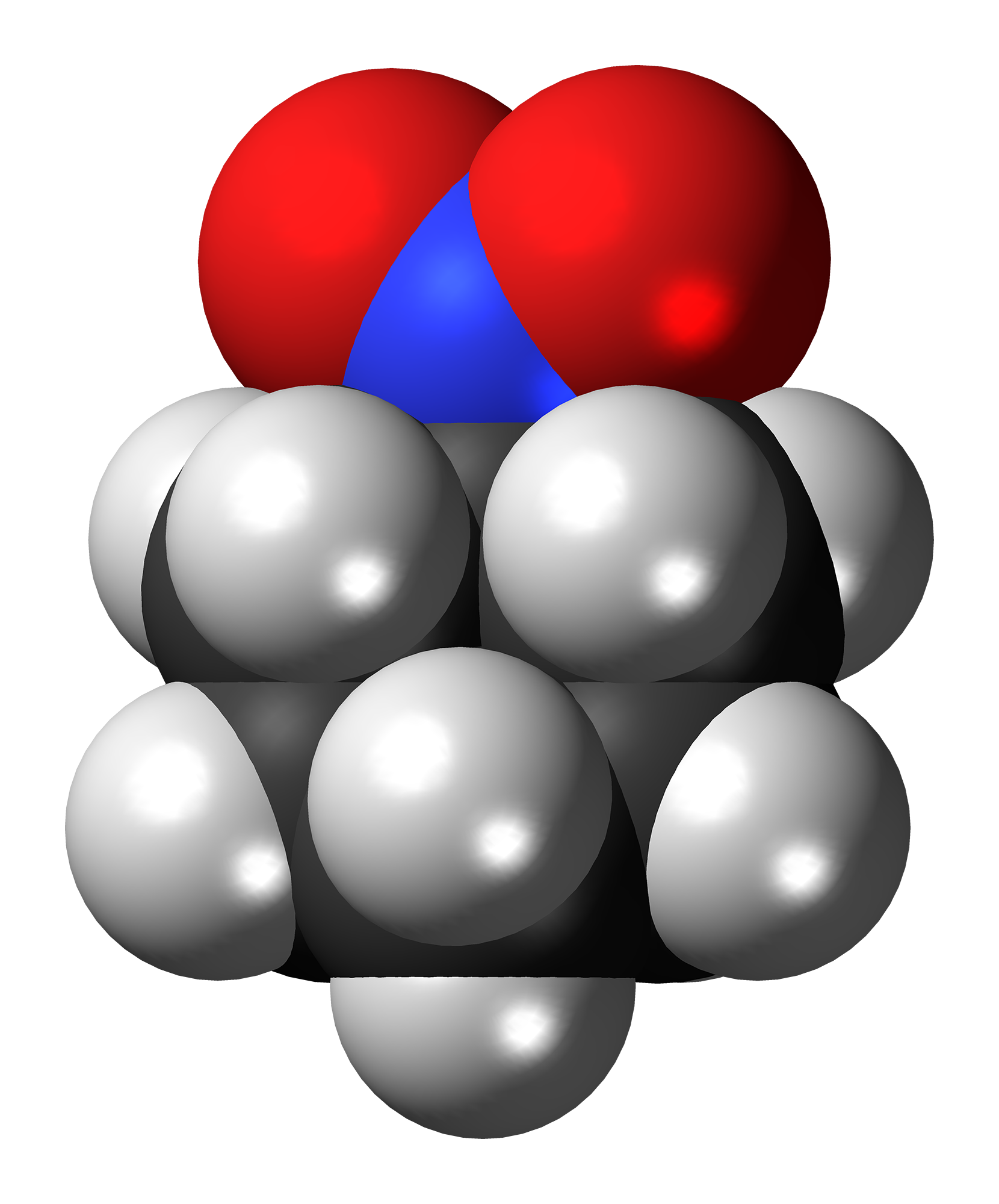

Names
- IUPAC name Nitrocyclohexane

Identifiers
CAS Number	1122-60-7
3D model (JSmol)	Interactive image
Abbreviations	CyNO_{2}
ChemSpider	13647
ECHA InfoCard	100.013.050
PubChem CID	14285
UNII	LL1X024M73
CompTox Dashboard (EPA)	DTXSID6061529
- InChI: InChI=1S/C6H11NO2/c8-7(9)6-4-2-1-3-5-6/h6H,1-5H2 Key: NJNQUTDUIPVROZ-UHFFFAOYSA-N; InChI=1/C6H11NO2/c8-7(9)6-4-2-1-3-5-6/h6H,1-5H2 Key: NJNQUTDUIPVROZ-UHFFFAOYAA
- SMILES: [O-][N+](=O)C1CCCCC1

Properties
Chemical formula	C_{6}H_{11}NO_{2}
Molar mass	129.159 g·mol^{−1}
Density	1.061 g/cm^{3}
Melting point	−34 °C (−29 °F; 239 K)
Boiling point	205.8 °C (402.4 °F; 478.9 K)
- Except where otherwise noted, data are given for materials in their standard state (at 25 °C [77 °F], 100 kPa). Infobox references

Nitrocyclohexane is an organic compound with the molecular formula C_{6}H_{11}NO_{2} or (CH_{2})_{5}CHNO_{2}. It is a colorless liquid, but degraded samples appear pale yellow. It once was produced commercially as a precursor to caprolactam.

== Preparation ==
It is prepared by reaction of nitrogen dioxide with cyclohexane, the so-called Nixian process. Cyclohexane is a convenient substrate because all twelve C-H bonds are equivalent, so mononitration does not give isomers (unlike the case of n-hexane).

== Hazards ==
Nitrocyclohexane is highly flammable and a strong oxidizing agent. It is listed as an extremely hazardous substance by the Emergency Planning and Community Right-to-Know Act, and the NOAA warns that it can be explosive.
