= Methacrolein diacetate =

Names
- Preferred IUPAC name 2-Methylprop-2-ene-1,1-diyl diacetate
- Other names 2-Methyl-2-propene-1,1-diol diacetate; 2-Methylallylidene diacetate; 3,3-Diacetoxy-2-methyl-1-propene

Identifiers
CAS Number	10476-95-6
3D model (JSmol)	Interactive image
ChemSpider	23638
ECHA InfoCard	100.030.873
PubChem CID	25305
UNII	VQ6QDI298V
CompTox Dashboard (EPA)	DTXSID70864277
- InChI: InChI=1S/C8H12O4/c1-5(2)8(11-6(3)9)12-7(4)10/h8H,1H2,2-4H3 Key: QFXJBPCTHSTOPE-UHFFFAOYSA-N; InChI=1/C8H12O4/c1-5(2)8(11-6(3)9)12-7(4)10/h8H,1H2,2-4H3 Key: QFXJBPCTHSTOPE-UHFFFAOYAW
- SMILES: O=C(OC(OC(=O)C)/C(=C)C)C

Properties
Chemical formula	C_{8}H_{12}O_{4}
Molar mass	172.180 g·mol^{−1}
- Except where otherwise noted, data are given for materials in their standard state (at 25 °C [77 °F], 100 kPa). Infobox references

Methacrolein diacetate is a chemical compound with the molecular formula C_{8}H_{12}O_{4} and a molecular weight of 172.17848. It is a colorless liquid. It is listed as an extremely hazardous substance by the Emergency Planning and Community Right-to-Know Act, and the National Institute of Health identifies it as "an irritant of the eyes, skin, and respiratory tract."

== Toxicity ==
Methacrolein diacetate is extremely toxic, capable of causing severe eye injuries, burns on the skin, and hazards when inhaled. According to the NCBI, "Rabbit eye studies showed the material to cause severe irritation & corneal injury, being rated 9 on a scale of 10. It is markedly irritating to the skin & can cause a burn, but greater hazard is that of skin absorption ... It is hazardous from inhalation also. All rats exposed for 1 hr to essentially saturated vapors died, & five of six rats exposed to 63.5 ppm for 4 hr died."
