= Thiofanox =

Names
- IUPAC name [(3,3-dimethyl-1-methylsulfanylbutan-2-ylidene)amino] N-methylcarbamate

Identifiers
CAS Number	39196-18-4
3D model (JSmol)	Interactive image
ChemSpider	35048
ECHA InfoCard	100.049.388
PubChem CID	38235
UNII	9ZE4QF28IN
CompTox Dashboard (EPA)	DTXSID4042468
- InChI: InChI=1S/C9H18N2O2S/c1-9(2,3)7(6-14-5)11-13-8(12)10-4/h6H2,1-5H3,(H,10,12) Key: FZSVSABTBYGOQH-UHFFFAOYSA-N; InChI=1/C9H18N2O2S/c1-9(2,3)7(6-14-5)11-13-8(12)10-4/h6H2,1-5H3,(H,10,12) Key: FZSVSABTBYGOQH-UHFFFAOYAI
- SMILES: O=C(ON=C(C(C)(C)C)CSC)NC

Properties
Chemical formula	C_{9}H_{18}N_{2}O_{2}S
Molar mass	218.32 g·mol^{−1}
- Except where otherwise noted, data are given for materials in their standard state (at 25 °C [77 °F], 100 kPa). Infobox references

Thiofanox is an organic chemical compound used as an acaricide and insecticide. It is a carbamate pesticide, more specifically an oxime carbamate.

Thiofanox is a colourless solid with a pungent odour at room temperature.

== Regulation ==
In the Great Britain, Thiofanox is not approved for use as an active substance in plant protection products.

Thiofanox is also listed on the UK government as reportable poison, identified by CAS number 39196-18-4.
