= Dimethyl 4-(methylthio)phenyl phosphate =

Names
- Preferred IUPAC name Dimethyl 4-(methylsulfanyl)phenyl phosphate
- Other names Phosphoric acid, dimethyl 4-(methylthio)phenyl ester

Identifiers
CAS Number	3254-63-5
3D model (JSmol)	Interactive image
ChemSpider	17587
ECHA InfoCard	100.149.174
PubChem CID	18621
UNII	2W78A2FD6N
CompTox Dashboard (EPA)	DTXSID00863137
- InChI: InChI=1S/C9H13O4PS/c1-11-14(10,12-2)13-8-4-6-9(15-3)7-5-8/h4-7H,1-3H3 Key: BUDNNLHZOCBLAU-UHFFFAOYSA-N; InChI=1/C9H13O4PS/c1-11-14(10,12-2)13-8-4-6-9(15-3)7-5-8/h4-7H,1-3H3 Key: BUDNNLHZOCBLAU-UHFFFAOYAE
- SMILES: O=P(Oc1ccc(SC)cc1)(OC)OC

Properties
Chemical formula	C_{9}H_{13}O_{4}PS
Molar mass	248.23 g·mol^{−1}
- Except where otherwise noted, data are given for materials in their standard state (at 25 °C [77 °F], 100 kPa). Infobox references

Dimethyl 4-(methylthio)phenyl phosphate is a chemical compound used as an insecticide and an acaricide.
