= 1,2-Dichloroethyl acetate =

Names
- Preferred IUPAC name 1,2-Dichloroethyl acetate
- Other names Acetic acid 1,2-dichloroethyl ester; Ethanol,1,2-dichloro-, acetate

Identifiers
CAS Number	10140-87-1
3D model (JSmol)	Interactive image
ChemSpider	23367
ECHA InfoCard	100.030.349
PubChem CID	24998
UNII	U3T2U068BB
CompTox Dashboard (EPA)	DTXSID80893073
- InChI: InChI=1S/C4H6Cl2O2/c1-3(7)8-4(6)2-5/h4H,2H2,1H3 Key: QRNBACUXNLBSDC-UHFFFAOYSA-N; InChI=1/C4H6Cl2O2/c1-3(7)8-4(6)2-5/h4H,2H2,1H3 Key: QRNBACUXNLBSDC-UHFFFAOYAH
- SMILES: CC(=O)OC(CCl)Cl

Properties
Chemical formula	C_{4}H_{6}Cl_{2}O_{2}
Molar mass	157.0 g/mol
- Except where otherwise noted, data are given for materials in their standard state (at 25 °C [77 °F], 100 kPa). Infobox references

1,2-Dichloroethyl acetate is a chemical compound used in the making of other organic chemicals. It is a liquid which is either white or resembles water.
