= O-Tolylthiourea =

o-Tolylthiourea

Names
- IUPAC name 1-(2-Methylphenyl)thiourea
- Other names (2-Methylphenyl)thiourea; N-(o-Tolyl)thiourea; N-(2-Methylphenyl)thiourea; 1-o-Tolyl-2-thiourea; 2-Tolylthiourea

Identifiers
CAS Number	614-78-8
3D model (JSmol)	Interactive image
ChemSpider	2067367
ECHA InfoCard	100.009.452
PubChem CID	2787703
UNII	4K71RZN35H
CompTox Dashboard (EPA)	DTXSID6060634
- InChI: InChI=1S/C8H10N2S/c1-6-4-2-3-5-7(6)10-8(9)11/h2-5H,1H3,(H3,9,10,11) Key: ACLZYRNSDLQOIA-UHFFFAOYSA-N; InChI=1/C8H10N2S/c1-6-4-2-3-5-7(6)10-8(9)11/h2-5H,1H3,(H3,9,10,11) Key: ACLZYRNSDLQOIA-UHFFFAOYAL
- SMILES: S=C(Nc1ccccc1C)N

Properties
Chemical formula	C_{8}H_{10}N_{2}S
Molar mass	166.24 g·mol^{−1}
- Except where otherwise noted, data are given for materials in their standard state (at 25 °C [77 °F], 100 kPa). Infobox references

o-Tolylthiourea is a highly toxic chemical compound.
