= Trichlorophenylsilane =

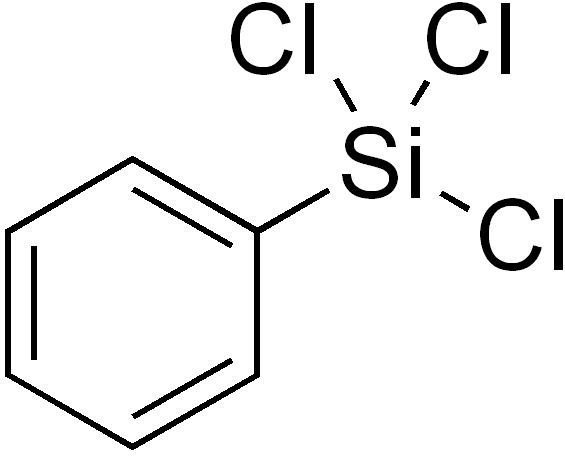

Names
- Preferred IUPAC name Trichloro(phenyl)silane

Identifiers
CAS Number	98-13-5
3D model (JSmol)	Interactive image
ChemSpider	7094
ECHA InfoCard	100.002.401
PubChem CID	7372
UNII	M7199JL06M
CompTox Dashboard (EPA)	DTXSID5026621
- InChI: InChI=1S/C6H5Cl3Si/c7-10(8,9)6-4-2-1-3-5-6/h1-5H Key: ORVMIVQULIKXCP-UHFFFAOYSA-N
- SMILES: c1ccc(cc1)[Si](Cl)(Cl)Cl

Properties
Chemical formula	C_{6}H_{5}Cl_{3}Si
Molar mass	211.54 g·mol^{−1}
- Except where otherwise noted, data are given for materials in their standard state (at 25 °C [77 °F], 100 kPa). verify (what is ?) Infobox references

Trichlorophenylsilane is a compound with formula Si(C_{6}H_{5})Cl_{3}.

Similarly to other alkylchlorosilanes, trichlorophenylsilane is a possible precursor to silicone. It hydrolyses in water to give HCl and phenylsilantriol, with the latter condensating to a polymeric substance.

== See also ==
- Methyltrichlorosilane
