= Fluenetil =

Names
- Preferred IUPAC name 2-Fluoroethyl ([1,1′-biphenyl]-4-yl)acetate
- Other names Lambrol

Identifiers
CAS Number	4301-50-2
3D model (JSmol)	Interactive image
ChemSpider	19113
ECHA InfoCard	100.149.202
PubChem CID	20288
UNII	S8K34P1L02
CompTox Dashboard (EPA)	DTXSID9058103
- InChI: InChI=1S/C16H15FO2/c17-10-11-19-16(18)12-13-6-8-15(9-7-13)14-4-2-1-3-5-14/h1-9H,10-12H2 Key: XAERLJMOUYEBAB-UHFFFAOYSA-N; InChI=1/C16H15FO2/c17-10-11-19-16(18)12-13-6-8-15(9-7-13)14-4-2-1-3-5-14/h1-9H,10-12H2 Key: XAERLJMOUYEBAB-UHFFFAOYAD
- SMILES: O=C(OCCF)Cc1ccc(cc1)c2ccccc2

Properties
Chemical formula	C_{16}H_{15}FO_{2}
Molar mass	258.292 g·mol^{−1}
- Except where otherwise noted, data are given for materials in their standard state (at 25 °C [77 °F], 100 kPa). Infobox references

Fluenetil (chemical formula: C_{16}H_{15}FO_{2}) is a chemical compound used in acaricides.
