= Bronchorrhea =

Bronchorrhea is the production of more than 100 mL per day of watery sputum. Chronic bronchitis is a common cause, but it may also be caused by asthma, pulmonary contusion, bronchiectasis, tuberculosis, cancer, scorpion stings, severe hypothermia and poisoning by organophosphates and other poisons. Massive bronchorrhea may occur in either bronchioloalveolar carcinoma, or in metastatic cancer that is growing in a bronchioloalveolar pattern. It commonly occurs in the setting of chest wall trauma, in which setting it can cause lobar atelectasis.

== Treatment ==
Treatment options for bronchorrhea vary depending on the inciting cause; they include:

- gefitinib - epidermal growth factor receptor tyrosine kinase inhibitor
- indomethacin
- corticosteroids
- octreotide
- radiation therapy
- bronchoscopy as is often done in the post traumatic setting.
