= Itaconic acid =

- Skeletal formula

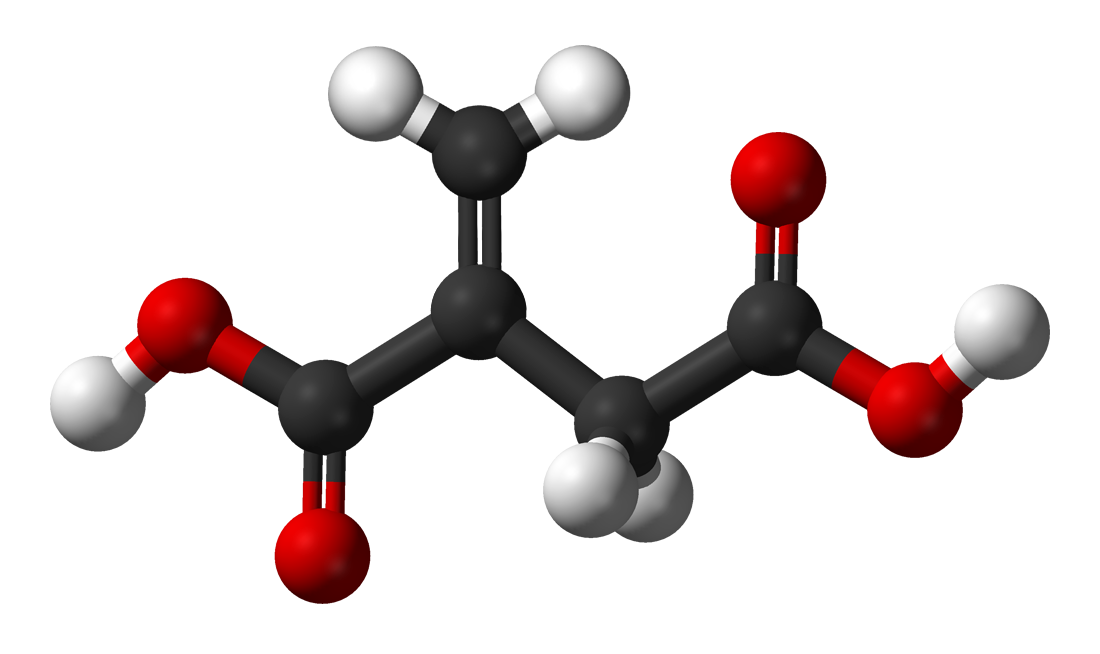
- Ball-and-stick model

Names
- Preferred IUPAC name Methylidenebutanedioic acid
- Other names 2-Methylenesuccinic acid Methylenesuccinic acid 1-Propene-2,3-dicarboxylic acid methylidenesuccinic acid 2-methylidenebutanedioic acid

Identifiers
| CAS Number | 97-65-4 |
| 3D model (JSmol) | Interactive image |
| ChEBI | CHEBI:30838 |
| ChEMBL | ChEMBL359159 |
| ChemSpider | 789 |
| ECHA InfoCard | 100.002.364 |
| KEGG | C00490 |
| PubChem CID | 811 |
| UNII | Q4516562YH |
| CompTox Dashboard (EPA) | DTXSID2026608 |
- InChI: InChI=1S/C5H6O4/c1-3(5(8)9)2-4(6)7/h1-2H2,(H,6,7)(H,8,9) Key: LVHBHZANLOWSRM-UHFFFAOYSA-N; InChI=1/C5H6O4/c1-3(5(8)9)2-4(6)7/h1-2H2,(H,6,7)(H,8,9) Key: LVHBHZANLOWSRM-UHFFFAOYAS
- SMILES: O=C(O)C(=C)CC(=O)O

Properties
| Chemical formula | C_{5}H_{6}O_{4} |
| Molar mass | 130.099 g·mol^{−1} |
| Appearance | White solid |
| Density | 1.63 g/cm^{3} |
| Melting point | 162 to 164 °C (324 to 327 °F; 435 to 437 K) (decomposes) |
| Solubility in water | 1 g/12 mL |
| Solubility in ethanol | 1 g/5 mL |
| Magnetic susceptibility (χ) | −57.57·10^{−6} cm^{3}/mol |
- Except where otherwise noted, data are given for materials in their standard state (at 25 °C [77 °F], 100 kPa). verify (what is ?) Infobox references

Itaconic acid is an organic compound with the formula CH_{2}=C(CO_{2}H)CH_{2}CO_{2}H. With two carboxyl groups, it is classified as a dicarboxylic acid. It is a non-toxic white solid that is soluble in water and several organic solvents. It plays several roles in biology.

== Reactions ==
Upon heating, itaconic acid converts to its anhydride.

As a dicarboxylic acid, itaconic acid has two pK_{a} values. At pH levels above 7, itaconic acid exists as its double negatively charged form, termed itaconate.

As an α,β-unsaturated carbonyl compound, itaconic acid is a good electrophile for Michael reactions. Thus, nucleophiles add across the C=C bond.

CH_{2}=C(CO_{2}H)CH_{2}CO_{2}H + R_{2}P(O)H → R_{2}P(O)CH_{2}−CHCH_{2}(CO_{2}H)_{2} (R = organic group).

This reaction is the means by which the fire retarding chemical 9,10-dihydro-9-oxa-10-phosphaphenanthrene-10-oxide can be incorporated into polymers.

== Production ==
In 1836, Samuel Baup discovered itaconic acid as a by-product in a dry distillation of citric acid. In the late 1920s, itaconic acid was isolated from a fungus in the Aspergillus genus of fungi The dry distillation forms itaconic anhydride, which then is hydrolyzed. Since the 1960s, however, it has been produced commercially by fermenting glucose, molasses, or another abundant carbon sources by a fungus such as Aspergillus itaconicus, Aspergillus terreus, or Ustilago maydis have also been investigated. One generally accepted route by which fungi make itaconate is through the tricarboxylic acid cycle pathway. This pathway forms cis-aconitate which is converted to itaconate by cis-aconitate-decarboxylase. Animal cells also make itaconate by an enzyme-catalyzed reaction from cis-aconitate, an intermediate metabolite in the tricarboxylic acid cycle, (i.e., TCA cycle). The itaconate-producing reaction is stimulated when the TCA cycle is suppressed.

Ustilago maydis makes itaconic acid from trans-aconitate, catalyzed by aconitate delta-isomerase. The trans-aconitate product is decarboxylated to itaconate by trans-aconitate decarboxylase (i.e., TAD1, an enzyme found in Ustilago maydis) Itaconate has also been obtained by fermenting the fungi Yarrowia lipolytica with glucose, various species of Candida fungi with glucose, Ustilago vetiveriae fungus with glycerol, and various species of Aspergillus niger fungi with glucose, sorbitol, or sorbitol plus xylose mixture. Fermenting Escherichia coli bacteria with glucose, xylose, glycerol, or starch and Corynebacterium glutamicum bacteria with glucose or urea also affords itaconic acid. Ustilago maydis has, however, been genetically engineered to increase its itaconic acid production,

== History ==
In the 1930s itaconate was shown to have bactericidal actions. In 2011, Strelko et al. reported that itaconate was produced by two mammalian immortalized cell lines, cultured mouse VM-M3 brain tumor cells and RAW 264.7 mouse macrophages, and by macrophages isolated from mice. This group also showed that stimulation of mouse macrophages with the bacterial toxin, lipopolysaccharide (i.e., LPS, also termed endotoxin), increased their production and secretion of itaconate. In 2013, Michelucci et al. revealed the biosynthesis pathway that makes itaconate in mammals. These publications were followed by numerous others focused on the biology of itaconate and certain itaconate-like compounds as regulars of various cellular responses in animals and possibly humans.

== Biology of Itaconate ==
Biological studies focus on itaconate's physiological and pathological functions.

=== Cellular sources of itaconate ===
The major cell types that normally make itaconate in response to stressful conditions or inflammatory stimuli are phagocytes of the myeloid lineage. This includes macrophages, monocytes, dendritic cells, and neutrophils. Itaconate is also produced by certain myeloid-derived suppressor cells (MDSCs). In the absence of inflammatory stimuli (i.e., under homeostatic conditions) itaconate production is low. Phagocyte stimulation leads to upregulation of IRG1 (immune-responsive gene 1), which encodes the enzyme required to synthesize itaconate.

=== Itaconate-forming metabolic pathway ===
Itaconate is a by-product of the tricarboxylic acid cycle, consisting of eight successive enzyme-catalyzed biochemical reactions that occur in the cell's mitochondria. When cis-aconitate, accumulates, aconitate decarboxylase (also termed ACOD1, cis-aconitate decarboxylase) metabolizes cis-aconitate to itaconate and carbon dioxide (CO_{2}) in the following decarboxylation reaction:

cis-aconitate → itaconate + CO_{2}

This itaconate is transported across the mitochondrial membrane into the cell's cytosol by the mitochondrial dicarboxylate carrier protein, mitochondrial 2-oxoglutarate/malate carrier protein, and citrate–malate shuttle. The cytosolic itaconate may then move form the cytosol through the patients' cells' surface membranes to the extracellular space (this trans-membrane movement may involve a specific transport protein such as the major facilitator superfamily transport protein (i.e., MfsA) in fungi.) This itaconate has mostly anti-inflammatory actions. It acts on its parent cell, other cells, and certain microorganism by stimulating or inhibiting the activity of various response-regulating pathways in its parent cell, other cells, and bacteria. Itaconate's actions on its parent and other cells were considered as entirely independent of any receptor. Itaconate stimulates certain mammalian cells by activating the OXGR1 receptor.

=== OXGR1 receptor ===
OXGR1 (also known as GPR99) is a G protein-coupled receptor that was identified in 2004 as a receptor for the tricarboxylic cycle intermediate, α-ketoglutarate. In 2013, it was found to also be a receptor for leukotriene E4 and to lesser extents leukotriene C4 and D4. Among a set of cultured human embryonic kidney HEK 293 cells made to express any one of 351 different human G protein-coupled receptors, only cells expressing OXGR1 responded to itaconate by raising their cytosolic Ca^{2+} levels. HEK 293 cells expressing any of the other 350 receptors did not consistently alter their cytosolic Ca^{2+} levels in response to itaconate. Respiratory epithelium cells isolated from control mice (i.e., these cells naturally express OXGR1) but not from Oxgr1 gene knockout mice (i.e., these cells lacked OXRG1) responded to itaconic acid by raising their cytosolic Ca^{2+} levels and stimulating their mucociliary clearance (equivalent to stimulating the secretion of mucus). Application of itaconate in the noses of control mice but not Oxgr1 gene knockout mice stimulated nasal secretion of mucus. Oxgr1 gene knockout mice and Irg1 gene knockout mice (mice lacking the itaconate-producing protein, IRG1) that were intranasally infected with Pseudomonas aeruginosa had increased numbers of these bacteria in their lung tissue and bronchoalveolar lavage fluid (i.e., airway washing) than control mice that respectively expressed OXGR1 and IRG1. α-ketoglutarate and itaconate, which have similar structures, activate OXGR1-expressing HEK293 cells at similar concentrations, i.e., between 200 and 300 μM/liter. These findings indicate that itaconate stimulates human HEK 293 and mouse respiratory epithelial cells by activating their OXGR1 receptors. Since OXGP1 is expressed in a wide range of tissues and mediates the allergic and inflammatory responses to the cited leukotrienes, it may be involved in the inflammatory responses detailed in the following "Actions of itaconate and its analogs" section. That is, itaconate, like succinate (see previous paragraph), may stimulate cells by receptor-dependent and receptor independent mechanisms. Future studies need to determine the extent to which OXGR1 contributes to the various actions of itaconate and itaconate-like compounds (see next section) as well as the potencies of each of these agents in activating OXGR1.

=== Itaconate and itaconate-like compounds ===
4-Octyl itaconate, dimethyl itaconate, and 4-ethyl itaconate have been used to mimic the biological effects of itaconate. These functional analogs of itaconate are often used in place of itaconate because of their presumed greater ability to pass through the surface membranes of, and thereby enter, cells. Many studies have examined the actions of itaconate analogs rather than itaconate itself and that itaconate and these analogs have on occasion shown significantly different biological activities.

The anionic forms of mesaconic and citraconic acids, i.e., mesaconate and citraconate, are isomers of itaconate that differ from itaconate by the location of their internal carbon to carbon double bonds (i.e., C=C). The two isomers have some but not all of the biological activities of itaconate. (Meconate is a natural product made by mouse macrophages.) Other compounds have been synthesized that enter cells and then breakdown into itaconate plus a second inflammation-inhibiting agent, carbon monoxide. These compounds, termed itaCORMs, activate some of the anti-inflammatory pathways activated by itaconate but also to have the anti-inflammatory activity of carbon monoxide in suppressing production of the pro-inflammatory cytokine, interleukin-23. The itaCORMs require further study. Analyses of itaconate as well as each of the itaconate analogs, itaconate isomers, and itaCORM may be useful for selecting the agent(s) best suited to treat the human disorders which preclinical studies suggest are improved by itaconate or an itaconate-like compound(s).

=== Dietary sources of itaconate and its isomers ===
Itaconic acid and its two isomers, mesaconic and citraconic acids, were found in rye and wheat breads with appreciably higher concentrations of itaconic and citraconic acids in their crusts (i.e., outer bread layer) than crumbs (i.e., soft inner part of the bread). Based on the average consumption of bread and bread-related baked goods in Germany, the daily intake of itaconate plus its two isomers was estimated to be from 7 to 20 micrograms. Rats have been shown to absorb the itaconic acid that was added to their diet.

=== Actions of itaconate and its analogs ===
Itaconate and its analogs can operate concurrently through multiple pathways to induce their effects. Relevant to this, future studies must determine the role of the newly defined receptor for itaconate, OXGR1, in contributing to the mediation of the following actions of itaconate and itaconate-like compounds.

==== Inhibit succinate dehydrogenase ====
Succinate dehydrogenase (i.e., SDH) is an enzyme complex of six proteins in the mitochondrial tricarboxylic acid cycle that metabolizes succinate to fumarate. (Although bacteria generally lack mitochondria, their surface membranes have a similar SDH system.) Itaconate inhibits SDH's activity thereby blocking succinate's oxidation to fumarate and causing succinate levels to increase. Itaconate has been reported to increase succinate levels in a wide variety of cells including cultured mouse RAW264.7 macrophages, macrophages differentiated from human monocytes, Huh7 human liver carcinoma cells, human MCF-7 breast cancer cells, human A549 lung adenocarcinoma cells, and the brain neurons and astrocytes generated from rat embryo brain tissue. This succinate stimulates various responses in its parent and other cells as detailed elsewhere (see SUCNR1 and succinic acid).

==== Inactivate KEAP1 ====
KEAP1 (i.e., Kelch-like ECH-associated protein 1) resides in the cytoplasm of cells. It binds the transcription factor nuclear factor erythroid 2-related factor 2 (i.e., NFE2L2 or Nrf2) thereby holding it in the cytosol and unable to enter the cell nucleus where it would inhibit the expression of certain genes. Retention of Nrf2 in the cell's cytosol also promotes its degradation by E3 ubiquitin ligase. Nrf2: a) inhibits its target genes from expressing their pro-inflammatory cytokines, Interleukin 1 beta, i.e., IL-1β (which is enzymatically cleaved to its active form by caspase 1) and tumor necrosis factor; b) inhibits its target genes expression of hypoxia-inducible factor 1-alpha which is converted enzymatically to an active form that stimulates the pro-inflammatory actions of macrophages (i.e., by inducing them to assume the MI macrophage subtype), dendritic cells, T cells, and neutrophils; and c) increases the cellular and tissue levels of pro-inflammatory reactive oxygen species. 4-Octyl itaconate, dimethyl itaconate, and itaconate inactivate KEAP1 thereby increasing Nrf2's entry into the cell nucleus and inhibiting production of the cited pro-inflammatory cytokines and various reactive oxygen species.

In a model of intracellular inflammation, LPS stimulated mouse bone marrow-derived macrophages to increase their levels of IL-1β, tumor necrosis factor, hypoxia-inducible factor 1-alpha, and reactive oxygen species. 4-Octyl itaconate suppressed all of these LPS-induced responses. It also reduced the production of IL-1β and tumor necrosis factor in LPS-stimulated human peripheral blood monocytes. And, in a model of LPS-induced septic shock, mice injected intraperitoneally with LPS plus 4-octyl itaconate had fewer physical symptoms of shock, lower serum levels of the pro-inflammatory cytokines, IL-1β and tumor necrosis factor, unchanged levels of the anti-inflammatory cytokine interleukin 10, and longer survival times compared to mice treated with LPS but not 4-octyl itaconate. Thus, the inhibitory effects of 4-octyl itaconate, dimethyl itaconate, and itaconate on cells appear due to their inactivation of KEAP1 and resulting movement of cytosolic Nrf2 into the cell nucleus where it inhibits its target genes from producing reactive oxygen species and the cited inflammation-promoting proteins. This mechanism may also underlie 4-octyl itaconate's ability to reduce the severity of LPS-induced shock in mice.

==== Inhibit NLRP3 ====
The NLRP3-containing inflammasome, like the other types of inflammasomes, is a cytosolic multiprotein complex that when activated promotes inflammatory reactions. The NLRP3-containing inflammasome forms in response to danger signals (e.g., LPS, pathogens, etc.). These signals cause cytosolic NLRP3 (i.e., NLR family pyrin domain containing 3) to bind PYCARD (i.e., apoptosis-associated speck-like protein containing a CARD) which in turn binds and activates the enzyme caspase 1 to form the functional NLRP3-containing inflammasome. This inflammasome's activated caspase 1 cleaves a) the protein precursors of IL-1β and interleukin 18 into their active pro-inflammatory cytokine forms and b) gasdermin D (also termed GSDMD) into its active form that triggers its parent cell's pyroptosis response. Pyroptosis is a form of programmed cell death which causes parent cell swelling, Lysis (i.e., the breakdown of their surface membranes), and the release of IL-1β and interleukin 18 into the extracellular space where they stimulate other cells to mount inflammatory responses.

In one study, cultured bone marrow-derived mouse macrophages were treated with LPS for 3 hours, 4-octyl itaconate or buffer for the next 45 minutes, nigericin or adenosine triphosphate (both agents activate NLRP3) for the next 45 minutes, and then assayed for extracellular IL-1β, interleukin 18, gasdermin D, and a protein not released by cells unless they had died, lactate dehydrogenase. Compared to cells not treated with 4-octyl itaconate, 4-octyl itaconate-treated cells released less IL-1β, interleukin 18, gasdermin D, and lactate dehydrogenase. Thus, 4-octyl itaconate suppressed the release of the two pro-inflammatory cytokines by, and reduced the death rate of, these cells. Dimethyl itaconate and itaconate likewise inhibited these cells from releasing IL-1β (release of the other proteins not reported). Similar results occurred in studies on mononuclear cells isolated from the blood of persons who did or did not have the cryopyrin-associated periodic syndrome, i.e., CAPS. CAPS is an autoinflammatory disease due to any one of several mutations in the NLRP3 gene; these mutations cause cells to release excessive amounts of IL-1β. 4-Octyl itaconate inhibited the release of IL-1β from LPS- or Pam3CSK4-stimulated (Pam3CSK4a mimics LPS's actions), nigericin-activated mononuclear cells isolated from the blood of persons who did or did not have CAPS. Finally, the injection of monosodium urate crystals (a form of uric acid that activates the NLRP3 inflammasome) into the peritoneum of mice caused peritonitis (i.e., inflammation of the serous membrane that lines the abdominal cavity and the cavity's organs (e.g., intestines, liver, etc.). Injection of 4-octyl itaconate along with the uric acid crystals significantly reduced this inflammation response as indicated by the lower levels of IL-1β and another pro-inflammatory cytokine, interleukin 6 (i.e., IL-6), and fewer inflammation-inducing neutrophils in the peritoneum compared to 4-octyl itaconate-untreated mice. These studies indicate that itaconate, dimethyl itaconate, and 4-octyl itaconate inhibit NLRP3 and thereby the formation of the active NLRP3 inflammasome. This inhibition appears responsible for the ability of itaconate, dimethyl itaconate, and 4-octyl itaconate to suppress the pro-inflammatory responses of mouse macrophages and human mononuclear cells to LPS as well as the ability of 4-octyl itaconate to suppress the peritoneal inflammatory response of mice to urate crystals.

==== Increase ATF3 levels ====
ATF3 (i.e., cyclic AMP-dependent transcription factor ATF-3) is a transcription factor that inhibits the NFKBIZ gene's expression of NF-kappa-B inhibitor zeta (i.e., IκBζ), a protein located in the cell nucleus that promotes the production of certain pro-inflammatory cytokines such as IL-6, interferon gamma, and granulocyte-macrophage colony-stimulating factor. Itaconate and dimethyl itaconate stimulate the production of ATF3 thereby suppressing the cellular levels of IκBζ and IL-6 as well as IL-6-promoted inflammatory responses.

Studies have shown that: a) Atf3 gene knockout embryonic mouse fibroblasts and bone marrow-derived mouse macrophages (these cells lack ATF3 protein) had higher levels of IκBζ and pro-inflammatory cytokines (including IL-6 in the macrophage study) than control (i.e., ATF3 protein-expressing) fibroblasts and macrophages; b) Irg1 gene knockout peritoneal macrophages (i.e., macrophages lacking the itaconate-forming enzyme, IRK1) had lower levels of ATF3 than control mice but 4-oleyl itaconate treatment increased their ATF3 levels; c) dimethyl itaconate inhibited the ability of LPS to increase the levels of IκBζ protein and IL-6 in mouse bone marrow-derived macrophages; d) Atf3 gene knockout mice with experimentally-induced inflammation of their hearts caused by either myocardial infarction due to the ligation of their left anterior descending coronary artery or by intraperitoneal injections of the heart-injuring drug, doxorubicin, developed greater levels of cardiac tissue inflammation, larger cardiac infarction (i.e., dead tissue) sizes, more cardiac fibrosis, poorer cardiac function, and higher blood serum levels of IL-6 than ATF3-expressing control mice; and e) 4-octyl itaconate reduced the IL-6 serum levels, cardiac inflammation, cardiac fibrosis, infarction size, and cardiac dysfunction caused by myocardial infarction or doxorubicin in Atf3 gene knockout mice. These findings suggest that 4-octyl itaconate and dimethyl itaconate have anti-inflammatory actions in these cited models of inflammation and do so by increasing ATF3 and/or decreasing IκBζ levels which in turn reduces the levels of inflammation-promoting cytokines.

==== Inhibit Tet methylcytosine dioxygenase 2 ====
Tet methylcytosine dioxygenase 2 (i.e., TET2) is an enzyme that is activated by the tricarboxylic acid cycle intermediate metabolite, α-ketoglutarate. Itaconate blocks this activation. Activated TET2 hydroxylates, i.e. adds a hydride group (notated as OH^{−}), to the methyl group (notated as -CH_{3}) of 5-methylcytosine on the cytosine (i.e., C) in the CpG sites of the DNA in its target genes. The 5-hydroxymethylcytosine DNA formed by this hydroxylation may inhibit or stimulate some of these target genes' production of the proteins they direct to be made (see Gene expression). In addition, TET2 binds to two histone deacetylases, HDAC1 and HDAC2, which are thereby activated. The gene expression-regulating and HDAC1/2 activation effects of itaconate have anti-inflammatory actions. For example, they suppress the levels of the proinflammatory cytokines, IL-6 and IL-1β, in dendritic cells and macrophages.

Studies have shown that: a) itaconate blocked α-ketoglutarate from binding to and thereby activating the isolated TET2 protein in a cell-free system; b) TET2 gene knockout bone marrow-derived macrophages (i.e., BMDMs) had far lower levels of hydroxymethylcytosine in their DNA than control macrophages; c) itaconate and 4-octyl itaconate lowered the amount of hydroxymethylcytosine in the DNA of control but not in TET2 gene knockout BMDMs; d) LPS stimulation of mouse macrophage RAW264.7 cells (these cells express TET2) caused increases in their levels of the messenger RNA (and presumably therefore the protein levels) of three proinflammatory chemokines (i.e., proteins that among other functions mobilize inflammation-promoting leukocytes), CXCL9, CXCL10, and CXCL11, but did not do so in Tet2 gene knockout RAW264.7 cells; e) itaconate reduced the ability of LPS to stimulate rises in the messenger RNA levels for IL-6 and IL-1β in RAW264.7 cells; f) 4-octyl itaconate reduced the ability of LPS to raise the messenger RNA levels of IκBζ, Il-6, CXCL9, CXCL10, and CXCL11 in the RAW264 cells; g) in a model of LPS-induced septic shock, LPS-treated Irg1 gene knockout mice (i.e., mice lacking the itaconate-forming protein, IRG1), had higher serum levels of IL-6, greater lung damage, and poorer survival times than control (i.e. IRG1-expressing) LPS-treated mice; h) compared to LPS-treated control mice, LPS-treated mice that were made to express an inactive TET2 protein (termed Tet2^{HxD}) in place of active TET2 protein had lower serum levels of pro-inflammatory cytokines IL-6 and tumor necrosis factor, lower serum levels of the proinflammatory chemokine CXCL9, lower serum levels of alanine transaminase and aspartate transaminase (i.e., liver proteins that are released in the circulation by damaged livers), less severe pulmonary edema and lung tissue injury, and longer survival times; and i) the intraperitoneal injection of itaconate 12 hours before LPS treatment of in mice expressing active TET2 likewise had lower serum levels of IL-6, tumor necrosis factor, CXCL9, alanine transaminase, and aspartate transaminase, less severe pulmonary edema and lung tissue injury, and longer survival times. These findings indicate that 4-octyl itaconate and itaconate inhibit the activation of TET2 and thereby the production of various proinflammatory cytokines and chemokines. At least some of these itaconate and 4-octyl itaconate actions appear to suppress the sepsis shock-like actions of LPS in mice. Further studies are needed to determine in itaconate and/or itaconate-like compounds suppress other inflammatory conditions. (Since TET2 inactivating gene mutations in humans have been associated the development of various cancers such as acute myeloid leukemia, the possibility that itaconate's inhibition of TET2's catalytic activity may lead to these cancers requires investigation.)

==== Inhibit interleukin 17A ====
Interleukin 17 (i.e., IL-17) refers to any one of 6 closely related subtypes, IL-17A to IL17F. IL-17A is a pro-inflammatory cytokine that is commonly elevated in cells undergoing inflammatory responses. (Some studies used the term IL-17 when referring to IL-17A or when the subtype of IL-17 measured was undefined.) Excessive IL-17A production appears to contribute to the development of various autoimmune diseases by stabilizing the messenger RNA for IκBζ and thereby increasing cellular levels of IκBζ protein and IL-6.

A study focusing on models of the skin autoimmune disease psoriasis reported that: a) cultured mouse and human keratinocytes, i.e., skin cells, treated with IL-17A increased their levels of IκBζ; b) pretreatment of these skin cells with dimethyl itaconate inhibited this increase; c) the application of imiquimod to the skin of mouse ears daily for 7 days caused psoriasis-like ear skin scaling (i.e., thickening of the skin's stratum corneum due to dry or greasy laminated masses of keratin) and edema in control mice but not do so in mice treated injected intraperitoneally with dimethyl itaconate 24 hours before application of imiquimod; and d) analysis of the ear skin of these mice found significant stimulation of various IκBζ-targeted genes in control mice but not in dimethyl itaconate-treated mice. These results suggest that dimethyl itaconate inhibited IL-17A's ability to increase IκBζ levels and thereby reduced the levels of IL-6 in mouse and human keratinocytes; this mechanism may have been responsible for the ability of dimethyl itaconate to block the psoriasis-like skin response of mice to imiquimod. Elevated levels of IL-17 (assumed to be IL-17A unless future studies define it as another IL-17 subtype) occur in the cells involved in other human autoimmune inflammatory disorders besides psoriasis. These other disorders include ankylosing spondylitis; rheumatoid arthritis; spondyloarthritis diseases (i.e., rheumatoid factor-antibody negative ankylosing spondylitis, psoriatic spondylitis, certain forms of reactive arthritis, inflammatory bowel disease-associated spondylitis, and unclassifiable spondylitis); Crohn's disease; ulcerative colitis, and Sjögren's syndrome. The effects of itaconate or one of its analogs in animal models of these autoimmune diseases should be examined in a manner similar to the studies in psoriasis.

==== Antibacterial actions ====
Itaconate can act directly on certain types of bacteria to limit their growth and disease-causing abilities. The enzyme isocitrate lyase is required for the glyoxylate cycle to operate in many bacteria. This cycle is a vital metabolic pathway that uses compounds containing 2 carbon atoms such as acetate to meet bacterial carbon needs when simple sugars, e.g., glucose, are unavailable. Itaconate inhibits isocitrate lyase, and thereby the functioning of the glycolate cycle and the growth of cultured and/or phagocytosed Staphylococcus aureus (including multiple drug resistant Staphyoocccus aureus), Vogesella indigofera (also termed Pseudomonas indigofera), Legionella pneumophila, Mycobacterium avium, Salmonella enterica, Coxiella burnetii, Francisella tularensis, and Acinetobacter baumannii.

Studies examining the effects of itaconate and itaconate-like compounds on phagocytosed bacterial have reported that: a) mouse bone marrow-derived macrophages exposed to live or heat-killed Staphylococcus aureus rapidly (i.e., within 1 hour) developed increases in their levels of IRG1 and IRG1's metabolite, itaconate; b ) human Müller retinal glia IO-M1 cells exposed to these live or heat-killed bacterial likewise showed rapid increases in their IRG1 levels (itaconate not measured); c) 4-octyl itaconate and dimethyl itaconate suppressed the growth of Staphylococcus aureus in mouse bone marrow-derived macrophages and Müller retinal glial IO-M1 cells by inhibiting these cells formation of the NLRP3 inflammasome and thereby the production of pro-inflammatory cytokines such as IL-1β; and d) itaconate suppressed the growth of Salmonella typhimurium in mouse macrophage-like RAW264.7 cells by stimulating these cells to produce reactive oxygen species. In a study of bacteria-induced endophthalmitis (i.e., eye inflammation): a) mice injected with live Staphylococcus aureus into their eye's aqueous humor developed increased retina tissue levels of the itaconate-forming enzyme, IRG1, as well as itaconate; b) Irg1 gene knockout mice (i.e., mice lacking IRG1 protein) that had interocular injections of these bacteria developed severer disease than control (i.e., IRG1-expressing) mice receiving these bacteria injections; c) Mice intraocularly injected with these bacteria plus itaconate, 4-octyl itaconate, or dimethyl itaconate developed less severe eye damage and fewer interocular bacteria than mice injected with these bacteria without getting injected with itaconate or the itaconate analogs; d) adding antibiotics to the itaconate treatment further reduced the severity of these eye infections; and e) analysis of the aqueous humor in the eyes of 22 patients with bacterial eye infections (i.e., 12 gram-positive and 10 gram-negative bacteria) found significantly higher levels of itaconate than those in the eyes of 10 patients with non-infectious eye problems (e.g., retinal detachment). These findings suggest that itaconate functions to suppress the growth of the cited bacteria in mice and may also do so in humans. They also support studies to determine if itaconate or itaconate-like compounds are useful for treating human Staphylococcus aureus eye infections, other types of bacterial eye infections in animals and humans, and animal and human infections in other tissue sites besides the eye. It should be noted, however, that Staphylococcus aureus and at least one other bacterial species, Pseudomonas aeruginosa, can use host cell-derived itaconate to form a biofilm that covers their surfaces and thereby increases their survival and pathogenicity.

==== Antiviral actions ====
Itaconate suppresses the growth of certain disease-causing viruses. Zika virus causes the mosquito-transmitted human disease, Zika fever. The virus produces symptomatic disease in only 20% of infected humans. These symptoms, which are usually mild, include rashes, fevers, conjunctivitis, muscle pains, joint pains, malaise, and headaches lasting for 2–7 days. However, the virus can cause severe nervous system birth defects in babies when it is transmitted from infected mothers to their embryos. These "congenital zika syndrome" defects include microcephaly, craniosynostosis (i.e., premature closure of the skull's fontanels), cerebellar hypoplasia, ventriculomegaly, and various other nervous system malformations. Zika virus also causes severe non-congenital nervous system inflammatory disorders such as the Guillain-Barré syndrome, encephalitis, disseminated encephalomyelitis, and transverse myelitis; in rare cases, it also causes cerebrovascular strokes. As of 2023, there were no vaccines or antiviral medications available to treat Zika fever. In cell culture studies, human A549 lung adenocarcinoma cells and Huh7 human hepatocyte-derived cancer cells were treated with buffer or 4-octyl itaconate for 2 days and then infected with Zika virus for 4 days. 4-Octyl itaconate suppressed the growth of this virus in both cancer cell types. In a model of neurological Zika disease, mice were injected intracranially with Zika virus plus or minus 4-octyl itaconate. 4-Ocyl itaconate significantly reduced the number of brain tissue Zika viruses. This study also indicated that the antiviral action of 4-octyl itaconate was associated with its inhibition of the succinate dehydrogenase enzyme and the resulting rises in brain tissue levels of succinate. Further studies are needed to determine if itaconate and/or its analogs will prove useful for treating Zika fever in humans.

4-Octyl itaconate also suppresses the proliferation of COVID-19. Treating cultured Vero cells (i.e., cells originally isolated from an African green monkey) with 4-octyl itaconate before infecting them with SARS-CoV-2 (strain #291.3 FR-4286) greatly reduced their content of this virus's RNA, the number of viral particles released by the Vero cells, and the number of Vero cells killed by the virus. 4-Octyl itaconate had similar anti-viral effects on cultured SARS-CoV-2-infected human lung cancer Calu-3 cells, human epithelial NuLi cells, and human airway epithelial cells. Further studies strongly suggested that these anti-viral actions of 4-octyl itaconate were due to its stimulating increases in the activity of the Nrf2 transcription factor (see the above section termed "Inhibit KEAP1"). Studies have also been conducted on cultured cells challenged with other disease-causing viruses. One or more of the itaconate analogs was shown to inhibit the growth of: a) Herpes simplex viruses types 1 and 2 in cultured human HaCaT keratinocyte skin cells; b) Vaccinia virus in human HaCaT T keratinocyte skin cells and mouse bone marrow-derived macrophages; and c) Zika virus in A549 and Huh-7 cells (see previous paragraph). Notably, however, 4-octyl itaconate enhanced rather than inhibited the growth of vesicular stomatitis virus in cultured 4T1 mouse breast cancer and 786-O human kidney carcinoma cells; it also reduced the inflammatory response to, and improved the survival of, influenza A virus but did not inhibit this virus's growth in mice.

==== Anti-cancer actions ====
Individuals with inflammatory bowel diseases, i.e., ulcerative colitis and Crohn's disease, have an increased risk of developing cancer in the afflicted areas of their colons and other parts of their gastrointestinal tracts. In a murine model of inflammatory bowel disease leading to colon cancer, mice were given an intraperitoneal injection of the cancer-causing agent azomethane on day 0, on day 5 were given an intraperitoneal injection of dimethyl itaconate or the vehicle used to dissolve dimethyl itaconate, on days 5 through 9 were given drinking water containing the colitis-causing agent dextran sodium sulfate, and on days 10 through 25 were given normal drinking water. After repeating this cycle three times, the mice were euthanized. Compared to mice treated with the vehicle, mice treated with dimethyl itaconate showed; a) less thickened and hyperplastic colons; b) fewer inflammatory cells in their colons; c) lower colon tissue levels of the proinflammatory cytokines, IL-1β and IL-6 as well as the proinflammatory chemokines, CCL2, CCL17, and Interleukin 8; and d) far fewer colon tumors. These findings indicate that dimethyl itaconate inhibited colon inflammatory responses to dextran sodium sulfate and presumably thereby colon cancer responses to azomethane in mice. They also support further preclinical studies to determine if itaconate-like compounds suppress human inflammation-related colon cancers.

Retinoblastoma is a cancer that develops in the retinas. The retinoblastomas of patients often become resistant to carboplatin as well as other chemotherapy drugs such as etoposide and vincristine, i.e., they are multiple drug resistant retinoblastomas. 4-Octyl itaconate induces Y79-CR cells to die, apparently by ferroptosis, i.e., it increased these cells ferrous and lipid peroxidation levels. Nude mice (i.e., immunodefient mice) were implanted with Y79-CR or Y79 cells in the subcutaneously issue of their flanks; one week later were interperitoneally injected with 4-octyl itaconate or the vehicle used to dissolve 4-octyl itaconate once every other day for 2 weeks; and were euthanized 21 days later. Tumor masses in mice given Y79-CL cells were far less in 4-octyl itaconate-treated than vehicle-treated mice. Also, the differences in tumor masses between 4-octyl itaconate-treated and vehicle-treated mice transplanted with Y79 cells were much less than that in mice transplanted with Y19-CR cells. These results indicate that 4-octyl itaconate selectively kills multiple drug resistant Y79-CR cells that are cultured or implanted in mice and does so by triggering ferroptosis. They also support studies to learn if itaconate and itaconate-like compounds would be useful for treating humans with carboplatin-resistant or other forms of multiple drug resistant retinoblastomas and perhaps other multiple drug resistant cancers.

Thymic carcinoma is a form of thymus gland cancer. In more advanced cases, it is commonly treated with platinum-based antineoplastic drugs and lenvatinib, an inhibitor of vascular endothelial growth factor receptors. However, patients often are or develop resistant to these drugs. Consequently, other agents are being evaluated as treatments for thymic carcinomas. Dimethyl itaconate decreases the proliferation of cultured Ty82 human thymic carcinoma cells but had relatively little effect on the proliferation of cultured non-cancerous human fibroblasts. Dimethyl itaconate treatment of the Ty82 cells decreased the activity of their mTOR protein as well as PI3K/AKT/mTOR pathway (This pathway promotes the development and/or progression of many cancers including some thymus gland cancers.) Temsirolimus, a specific inhibitor of mTOR, mimicked the action of dimethyl itaconate in suppressing the proliferation of Ty82 cells. These findings suggest that dimethyl itaconate inhibits the proliferation of Ty82 mouse cells by suppressing the activity of their mTOR protein and I3K/AKT/mTOR pathway. Further studies are needed to determine the effects of dimethyl itaconate, other itaconate-like compounds, and/or itaconate treating animals models of thymic carcinomas.

==== Varying actions of itaconate and its analogs ====
One study reported that dimethyl itaconate and 4-octyl itaconate stimulated mouse bone marrow-derived macrophages to produce pro-interferon-β (i.e., the precursor to the proinflammatory cytokine IFN-β as well as to secrete IL-6, interleukin 10, and IFN-β whereas itaconate and 4-ethyl itaconate had far less ability to or did not stimulate these responses. This result suggests that future studies should examine the actions of itaconate along with those of each of its analogs.

Itaconic acid's chemical structure consists of one unsaturated double bond and two carboxyl groups (see carboxylic acid}. This structure renders it readily converted to many valuable bio-based materials (i.e., materials derived from a living or once-living organism). For many years, these materials were commonly produced in the large amounts needed for industrial purposes from various types of carbohydrates. Itaconic acid has also been used to make these materials. In doing so, it is a comonomer, i.e., a precursor monomer, that is readily polymerized to various desired polymers that are further altered to form some of the same or similar products made from the polymerization of carbohydrates. The products made from itaconate include synthetic styrene-butadiene-based rubber, synthetic latexes, various plastics, superabsorbent polymers that absorb large amounts of liquids (for use in, e.g., baby diapers), unsaturated polyester resins that are used to make glass fiber-reinforced plastics (e.g., fiberglass), detergents, and biofuels (i.e., fuels made from organic materials such as itaconic acid). It is also converted to methyl methacrylate, a product that has many commercial and some medical applications (see uses of methyl methacrylate). Fields using the products of itaconate include those that manufacture paint, lacquers (i.e., coatings for covering the surfaces of various objects), plasticizers, plastics, chemical fibers, hygienic materials, construction materials, and environmentally-friendly fuels that can be substituted for pollution-causing, non-renewable fuels such as coal, oil, and natural gas. Itaconic acid itself may be mass-produced if it or any of the analogs synthesized from it are found to be useful for treating medical disorders.

The demand for itaconic acid has grown to such an extent that it is projected to reach a market value of 177 million dollars per year in United States of American currency by 2028. Consequently, alternate methods for making products with properties similar or identical to those made from itaconic acid by using less costly substitutes for itaconic acid and/or methods that are more productive, less expensive, and/or more environmental-friendly than those used for itaconic acid are being evaluated. Betulin, for example, is an abundant, naturally occurring diol triterpene that is readily isolated from the bark of birch trees. Betulin forms polymers that have some of the biochemical properties found in itaconate polymers. Consequently, betulin is being studied to determine if it can be used in place of itaconic acid to form products with properties similar to those made from itaconic acid but doing so in economically and/or environmentally more favorable ways.
