= C5H6O4 =

The molecular formula C_{5}H_{6}O_{4} (molar mass: 130.10 g/mol) may refer to:

- Citraconic acid
- Glutaconic acid
- Itaconic acid, or methylidenesuccinic acid
- Mesaconic acid
- Monomethyl fumarate
