= Aconitate decarboxylase =

Class of enzymes

Identifiers
- EC no.: 4.1.1.6
- CAS no.: 9025-01-8

Databases
- BRENDA: enzyme data
- ExPASy: NiceZyme view
- KEGG: enzyme entry
- MetaCyc: metabolic pathway
- Rhea: reactions
- PDB structures: RCSB PDB PDBe PDBsum
- Gene Ontology: AmiGO / QuickGO
Search
- PMC: articles
- PubMed: articles
- NCBI: proteins

Aconitate decarboxylase (EC 4.1.1.6) (ACOD1, also called cis-aconitate decarboxylase, immune-responsive gene 1, immune response gene 1, and IRK1) is an enzyme that in humans is encoded by the aconitate decarboxylase 1 gene located at position 22.3 on the long arm (i.e., p-arm) of chromosome 13. It catalyzes the decarboxylation of (cis)-aconitic acid, giving itaconic acid:

(cis)-aconitic acid
CO_{2}
itaconic acid

(cis)-aconitic acid is a compound in the citric acid cycle and its decarboxylation is promoted by histidine residues at the active site.

ACOD1 is a lyase, specifically a carboxy-lyases, which cleave carbon-carbon bonds. The systematic name of this enzyme class is cis-aconitate carboxy-lyase (itaconate-forming). Other names in use for this enzyme class include CAD and cis-aconitate carboxy-lyase.

Ustilago maydis (a species of Ustilago fungi) converts cis-aconitate to its thermodynamically favored product, trans-aconitate, by the enzyme aconitate delta-isomerase (i.e., Adi1). The trans-aconitate product is decarboxylated to itaconate by trans-aconitate decarboxylase (i.e., Tad1). This Adi followed by Tad 1 enzymatic metabolic pathway is:

cis-aconitate $\rightleftharpoons$ trans-itaconate → itaconate + CO_{2}

Trans-aconitate decarboxylase does not metabolize cis-aconitate to itaconate. (The genes for aconitate delta-isomerase and trans-aconitate decarboxylase have been reported in several types of fungi hut not in other organisms, including humand, and are classified as provisional, i.e., accepted provisional to further studies.)
