= Trans-aconitate 3-methyltransferase =

Identifiers
- EC no.: 2.1.1.145

Databases
- IntEnz: IntEnz view
- BRENDA: BRENDA entry
- ExPASy: NiceZyme view
- KEGG: KEGG entry
- MetaCyc: metabolic pathway
- PRIAM: profile
- PDB structures: RCSB PDB PDBe PDBsum
- Gene Ontology: AmiGO / QuickGO
Search
- PMC: articles
- PubMed: articles
- NCBI: proteins

Trans-aconitate 3-methyltransferase (EC 2.1.1.145) is an enzyme that catalyzes the chemical reaction

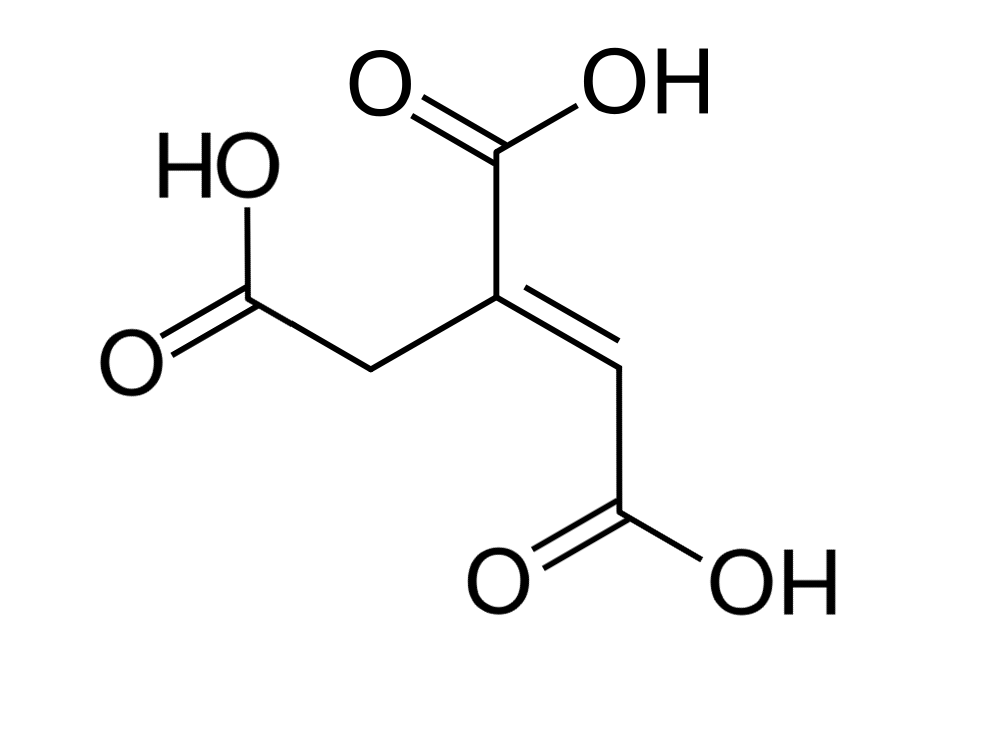
trans-aconitic acid
+ SAM
2-(methoxycarbonylmethyl)but-2-enedioic acid
+ SAH

This is a methylation reaction in which trans-aconitic acid is converted to a mono-ester, trans-2-(methoxycarbonylmethyl)but-2-enedioic acid. The methyl group comes from the cofactor, S-adenosyl methionine (SAM), which becomes S-adenosyl-L-homocysteine (SAH). The enzyme was characterised from Saccharomyces cerevisiae.

This enzyme belongs to the family of transferases, specifically those transferring one-carbon group methyltransferases. The systematic name of this enzyme class is S-adenosyl-L-methionine:(E)-prop-1-ene-1,2,3-tricarboxylate 3'-O-methyltransferase.

== See also ==
- Trans-aconitate 2-methyltransferase which converts the starting material into an alternative product.
