= C5H4O3 =

The molecular formula C_{5}H_{4}O_{3} (molar mass: 112.08 g/mol, exact mass: 112.0160 u) may refer to:

- 2-Furoic acid
- Itaconic anhydride
