= Henri Marie Peschier =

Genevan merchant and plantation owner

- Born: 24 November 1741; Geneva, Old Swiss Confederacy
- Died: 1791; Port of Spain, Trinidad
- Occupations: Merchant, plantation owner
- Spouse: Céleste Rose de Beltgens
- Relatives: Jacques Peschier (nephew)

Henri Marie Peschier (24 November 1741 – 1791) was a Genevan merchant and slaveholding plantation owner in the Caribbean. He established plantations in Grenada and Trinidad during the 18th century.

== Early life and family ==
Henri Marie Peschier was born into a Huguenot family originally from Languedoc. He was the son of Pierre Peschier, a master apothecary born in Bagnols-sur-Cèze, who was granted bourgeoisie of Geneva in 1718, and Anne Marguerite Blisson, born in Bern to Protestant refugees from Languedoc and Grenoble. He belonged to a family of 18 children and was the uncle of Jacques Peschier. One of his brothers, Pierre Peschier, became an important merchant in Copenhagen.

== Career in the Caribbean ==
In the 1760s, Henri Marie Peschier traveled to Grenada to join his older brother Jean Peschier, who had been established as a merchant on the island since 1762, at the time when it became a British possession. In 1770 or 1771, he married Céleste Rose de Beltgens, born in Grenada and descended from a noble family from the Spanish Netherlands, one of whose ancestors had been a militia colonel on the island as early as 1715. Jean Peschier married Rose Elisabeth de Beltgens, sister of Céleste Rose, in 1770.

The two brothers acquired several slaveholding plantations in Grenada, though the exact number, types of crops cultivated, and revenues generated are unknown. For one of these plantations, called Good Chance, Henri Marie and Jean Peschier requested a loan in 1774 from one of their brothers residing in Geneva, Charles-Antoine Peschier, a master apothecary. The loan and its repayment were documented in notarial acts. The loan amounted to 12,600 livres courantes and was secured by a mortgage on the plantation. These records indicate that, compared to most Caribbean plantations of the 18th century, Good Chance was a relatively modest operation.

== Trinidad ==
For unknown reasons, Henri Marie Peschier left Grenada to settle in Trinidad. He arrived in 1781 in Port of Spain, the capital of this British possession in the Caribbean, with his family and eight enslaved people. His brother Jean Peschier also moved to the island with his family. The year after his arrival, Henri Marie Peschier obtained, with the approval of colonial authorities, a 72-hectare estate near Port of Spain called Paradise Estate. The estate was dedicated to sugarcane production, cultivated through the forced labor of enslaved people. Upon Peschier's death, his widow inherited the plantation. The property subsequently passed to their children, who sold it in 1815 to the municipality of Port of Spain for 6,000 pounds sterling.

A family cemetery of the Peschiers is located in what is now Queen's Park Savannah in Port of Spain.
