= Itaconic anhydride =

Names
- Preferred IUPAC name 3-Methylideneoxolane-2,5-dione
- Other names Methylenesuccinic anhydride

Identifiers
CAS Number	2170-03-8
3D model (JSmol)	Interactive image
ChEMBL	ChEMBL87967
ChemSpider	67661
ECHA InfoCard	100.016.835
EC Number	218-518-2
PubChem CID	75110
UNII	Y455KS1U7Q
CompTox Dashboard (EPA)	DTXSID8062230
- InChI: InChI=1S/C5H4O3/c1-3-2-4(6)8-5(3)7/h1-2H2 Key: OFNISBHGPNMTMS-UHFFFAOYSA-N
- SMILES: C=C1CC(=O)OC1=O

Properties
Chemical formula	C_{5}H_{4}O_{3}
Molar mass	112,09 g·[mol^{−1}
Appearance	colorless crystalline solid
Melting point	70–72 °C (158–162 °F; 343–345 K)
Solubility in water	soluble in acetone and chloroform, only slightly soluble in Diethylether, reacts with water

Hazards
- GHS labelling
Pictograms	(GHS07: Exclamation mark)
Signal word	Warning
Hazard statements	H302, H315, H319, H335
Precautionary statements	P261, P264, P270, P271, P280, P301+P312, P302+P352, P304+P340, P305+P351+P338, P312, P321, P330, P332+P313, P337+P313, P362, P403+P233, P405, P501
- Except where otherwise noted, data are given for materials in their standard state (at 25 °C [77 °F], 100 kPa). Infobox references

Itaconic anhydride is the cyclic anhydride of itaconic acid (an unsaturated, dicarboxylic acid) and is obtained by the pyrolysis of citric acid. It is a colourless, crystalline solid, which dissolves in many polar organic solvents and hydrolyzes forming itaconic acid. Itaconic anhydride and its derivative itaconic acid have been promoted as biobased "platform chemicals" and bio- building blocks.) These expectations, however, have not been fulfilled.

== Production ==
As discovered as early as 1836, attempted distillation of citric acid gives the so-called "pyrocitric acid" ("Brenzcitronensäure"), now known as itaconic anhydride.

Synthese von Itaconsäureanhydrid aus Citronensäure

According to an organic synthesis protocol, itaconic anhydride is obtained from the rapid heating of citric acid monohydrate in a modest yield (37-47 %). The by-product is the thermodynamically more stable citraconic anhydride.

Also when heating anhydrous citric acid to 260 °C in a vacuum, a mixture of itaconic and citraconic anhydride is achieved "in good yield".

More productive are processes based on the biotechnologically accessible itaconic acid, which produces exclusively itaconic anhydride in yields of up to 98% at temperatures of 165-180 °C and pressures of 10-30 mmHg in the presence of catalytic quantities of strong acids, such as concentrated sulphuric acid.

Synthese von Itaconsäureanhydrid aus Itaconsäure

In order to avoid overheating and thus higher proportions of citraconic anhydride, the dehydration reaction can also be carried out in higher boiling aromatic solvents such as toluene or xylene in the presence of acidic montmorillonite or in cumene in the presence of methanesulfonic acid. In both variants yields of 95-97 % of itaconic anhydride are achieved.

Another process of cyclizing dicarboxylic acids with diethyl carbonate in the presence of a chromium-salen complex with μ-nitrido-bis(triphenylphosphane) chloride as cocatalyst quantitatively provides itaconic anhydride contaminated with citraconic anhydride already at 40 °C in 1 millimolar preparations. However, the reaction is technically uninteresting because of its expensive catalysts.

== Reactions ==
At temperatures above its melting point, itaconic anhydride converts to citraconic anhydride. Even at significantly lower temperatures, such as in boiling chloroform, isomerization can take place in the presence of tertiary amines.

Umlagerung von Itaconsäureanhydrid in Citraconsäureanhydrid

By treating itaconic anhydride with phosphorus pentachloride (PCl_{5}), itaconic acid dichloride (itaconyl chloride) is obtained:

Synthese von Itaconylchlorid

from which polyamides with reactive vinylidene groups can be formed with diamines.

Bromination of itaconic anhydride at – 20 °C and subsequent dehydrobromination produces 2-bromomethylmaleic anhydride in 70% yield by shifting the double bond into the five-membered ring.

Bromierung-Dehydrobromierung von Itaconsäureanhydrid

Otto Diels and Kurt Alder already described the addition (Diels-Alder reaction) of the dienophile itaconic anhydride to the diene cyclopentadiene in 1928. Also furfuryl alcohol, which is accessible from renewable raw materials, reacts as a diene to form the Diels-Alder adduct, in which the reaction of the alcohol group with the cyclic anhydride structure forms a lactone and a carboxylic acid group, i.e. the cyclic half ester of itaconic acid.

Diels-Alder-Reaktionen mit Itaconsäureanhydrid

Itaconic anhydride can react with aromatics such as benzene via Friedel-Crafts acylation. This always happens in such a way that the ring opening occurs at the carbonyl group, which is further away from the methylene group (3-position).

Friedel-Crafts-Acylierung mit Itaconsäureanhydrid

Nucleophiles such as thiols can easily be added to the methylene group. With other nucleophiles, such as alcohols, ammonia, amines and hydroxylamine, itaconic anhydride reacts regioselectively in position 3 to the corresponding esters, amides and hydroxamic acids.

Reaktionen von Itaconsäureanhydrid mit Nukleophilen

The hydroxamic acid formed with O-benzylhydroxylamine can be cyclized in high yields with dicyclohexylcarbodiimide (DCC) to five-membered isoimides (iminofuranones) or with acetanhydride (Ac_{2}O) to imides.

ildung von Itaconimiden und Iminofuranonen

A number of five-, six- and seven-membered heterocycles (such as benzothiazepines) are obtainable from itaconic anhydride in useful yields.

Bildung von Benzothiazepinessigsäure aus Itaconsäureanhydrid

=== Polymers of itaconic anhydride ===
As an unsaturated cyclic anhydride, itaconic anhydride undergoes radical polymerization and via polycondensation with diols or diamines. The two reactions can also be carried out sequentially – first radical polymerization, then polycondensation or vice versa.

Radically produced itaconic anhydride polymers and copolymers can be alkaline hydrolyzed to polyitaconic acids under ring opening or converted into polymeric acid amides or esters subsequent to polymerization.

Copolymere von Itaconsäureanhydrid mit Stearylmethacrylat + Hydrolyse

The resulting copolymers show properties that suggest a potential use as biomaterials for therapeutic systems and prostheses.

Functional polymers exclusively from biogenic monomers involves the ring-opening metathesis polymerisation of an oxanorbornene ester produced from itaconic anhydride and furfuryl alcohol by Diels-Alder lactonisation using a Grubbs II catalyst.

ROMP-Reaktion mit Itaconsäureanhydrid-Cyclopentadien/Furfurylalkohol-Diels-Alder-Addukt
