= Dicarboxylic acid =

Organic compound with two –COOH groups

In organic chemistry, a dicarboxylic acid is an organic compound containing two carboxyl groups (−COOH). The general molecular formula for dicarboxylic acids can be written as HO_{2}C−R−CO_{2}H, where R can be aliphatic or aromatic. In general, dicarboxylic acids show similar chemical behavior and reactivity to monocarboxylic acids. Dicarboxylic acids are usually colorless solids. A wide variety of dicarboxylic acids are used in industry. Adipic acid, for example, is a precursor to certain kinds of nylon. A wide variety of dicarboxylic acids are found in nature. Aspartic acid and glutamic acid are two amino acids found in all life. Succinic and fumaric acids are essential for metabolism. A large inventory of derivatives are known including many mono- and diesters, amides, etc.

== Partial list of saturated dicarboxylic acids ==
Some common or illustrative examples

C	n	Common name	Systematic IUPAC name	Structure	pK_{a}1	pK_{a}2	PubChem
C2	0	Oxalic acid	ethanedioic acid		1.27	4.27	971
C3	1	Malonic acid	propanedioic acid		2.85	5.05	867
C4	2	Succinic acid	butanedioic acid		4.21	5.41	1110
C5	3	Glutaric acid	pentanedioic acid		4.34	5.41	743
C6	4	Adipic acid	hexanedioic acid		4.41	5.41	196
C7	5	Pimelic acid	heptanedioic acid		4.50	5.43	385
C8	6	Suberic acid	octanedioic acid		4.526	5.498	10457
C8	6		1,4-Cyclohexanedicarboxylic acid				14106
C9	7	Azelaic acid	nonanedioic acid		4.550	5.498	2266
C10	8	Sebacic acid	decanedioic acid		4.720	5.450	5192
C11	9		undecanedioic acid				15816
C12	10		dodecanedioic acid				12736
C13	11	Brassylic acid	tridecanedioic acid				10458
C14	12	Tetradecanedioic acid	Tetradecanedioic acid]				
C16	14	Thapsic acid	hexadecanedioic acid				10459
C21	19	Japanic acid	heneicosanedioic acid				9543668
C22	20	Phellogenic acid	docosanedioic acid				244872
C30	28	Equisetolic acid	triacontanedioic acid				5322010

== Unsaturated dicarboxylic acids ==
Type	Common name	IUPAC name	Isomer	Structural formula	PubChem
Monounsaturated	Maleic acid	(Z)-Butenedioic acid	cis		444266
Monounsaturated	Fumaric acid	(E)-Butenedioic acid	trans		444972
Monounsaturated	Glutaconic acid	(Z)-Pent-2-enedioic acid	cis		5370328
Monounsaturated	Glutaconic acid	(E)-Pent-2-enedioic acid	trans		5280498
Monounsaturated		2-Decenedioic acid	trans		6442613
Monounsaturated	Traumatic acid	Dodec-2-enedioic acid	trans		5283028
Diunsaturated	Muconic acid	(2E,4E)-Hexa-2,4-dienedioic acid	trans,trans		5356793
Diunsaturated	Muconic acid	(2Z,4E)-Hexa-2,4-dienedioic acid	cis,trans		280518
Diunsaturated	Muconic acid	(2Z,4Z)-Hexa-2,4-dienedioic acid	cis,cis		5280518
Diunsaturated	Glutinic acid (Allene-1,3-dicarboxylic acid)	(RS)-Penta-2,3-dienedioic acid		HO_{2}CCH=C=CHCO_{2}H	5242834
Branched	Citraconic acid	(2Z)-2-Methylbut-2-enedioic acid	cis	HO2CCH=C(CH3)CO2H	643798
Branched	Mesaconic acid	(2E)-2-Methyl-2-butenedioic acid	trans	HO2CCH=C(CH3)CO2H	638129
Branched	Itaconic acid	2-Methylidenebutanedioic acid	–		811
Acetylenic	Acetylenedicarboxylic acid	But-2-ynedioic acid	not applicable		371

== Substituted dicarboxylic acids ==
Common name	IUPAC name	Structural formula	PubChem
Tartronic acid	2-Hydroxypropanedioic acid		45
Mesoxalic acid	Oxopropanedioic acid		10132
Malic acid	Hydroxybutanedioic acid		525
Tartaric acid	2,3-Dihydroxybutanedioic acid		875
Oxaloacetic acid	Oxobutanedioic acid		970
Aspartic acid	2-Aminobutanedioic acid		5960
dioxosuccinic acid	dioxobutanedioic acid		82062
α-hydroxyGlutaric acid	2-hydroxypentanedioic acid		43
Arabinaric acid	2,3,4-Trihydroxypentanedioic acid		109475
Acetonedicarboxylic acid	3-Oxopentanedioic acid		68328
α-Ketoglutaric acid	2-Oxopentanedioic acid		51
Glutamic acid	2-Aminopentanedioic acid		611
Diaminopimelic acid	(2R,6S)-2,6-Diaminoheptanedioic acid		865
Saccharic acid	(2S,3S,4S,5R)-2,3,4,5-Tetrahydroxyhexanedioic acid		33037

== Aromatic dicarboxylic acids ==
Common names	IUPAC name	Structure	PubChem
Phthalic acid o-phthalic acid	Benzene-1,2-dicarboxylic acid		1017
Isophthalic acid m-phthalic acid	Benzene-1,3-dicarboxylic acid		8496
Terephthalic acid p-phthalic acid	Benzene-1,4-dicarboxylic acid		7489
Diphenic acid Biphenyl-2,2′-dicarboxylic acid	2-(2-Carboxyphenyl)benzoic acid		10210
2,6-Naphthalenedicarboxylic acid	2,6-Naphthalenedicarboxylic acid		14357

Terephthalic acid is a commodity chemical used in the manufacture of the polyester known by brand names such as PET, Terylene, Dacron and Lavsan.

== See also ==
- Branched-chain dicarboxylic acids
- Tricarboxylic acid
