= C5H8O5 =

The molecular formula C_{5}H_{8}O_{5} (molar mass: 148.12 g/mol, exact mass: 148.0372 u) may refer to:

- Citramalic acid
- α-Hydroxyglutaric acid
