= Pyrocitric =

Pyrocitric is a group of organic chemical compounds pertaining to, or designating, any one of three acids obtained by the distillation of citric acid, and called respectively citraconic, itaconic, and mesaconic acid.
