= C22H42O4 =

The molecular formula C_{22}H_{42}O_{4} (molar mass: 370.56 g/mol) may refer to:

- Bis(2-ethylhexyl) adipate
- Dioctyl adipate
- Docosanedioic acid
