= Suberoyl chloride =

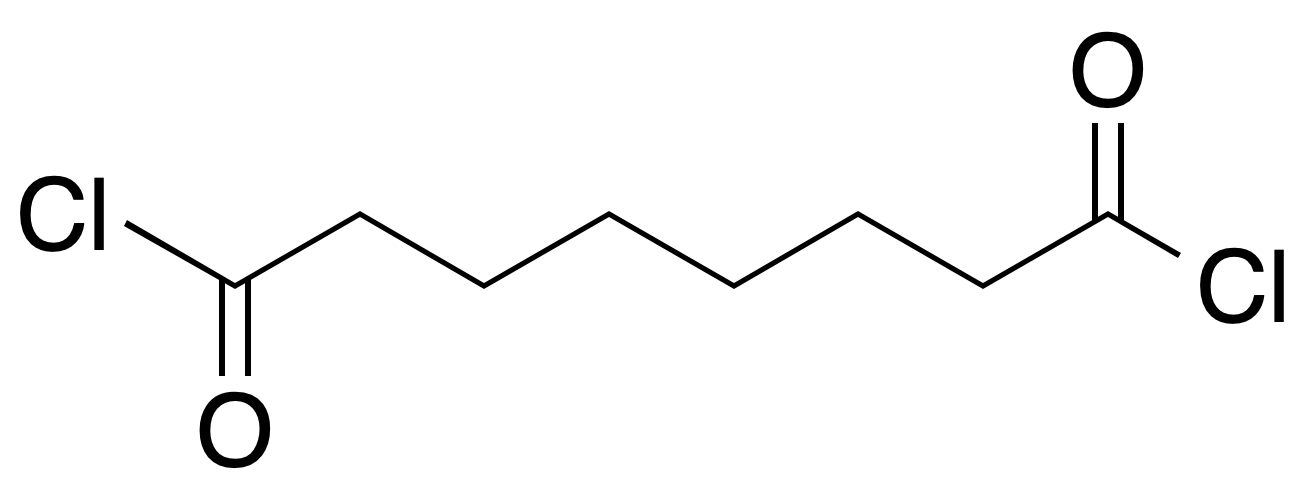

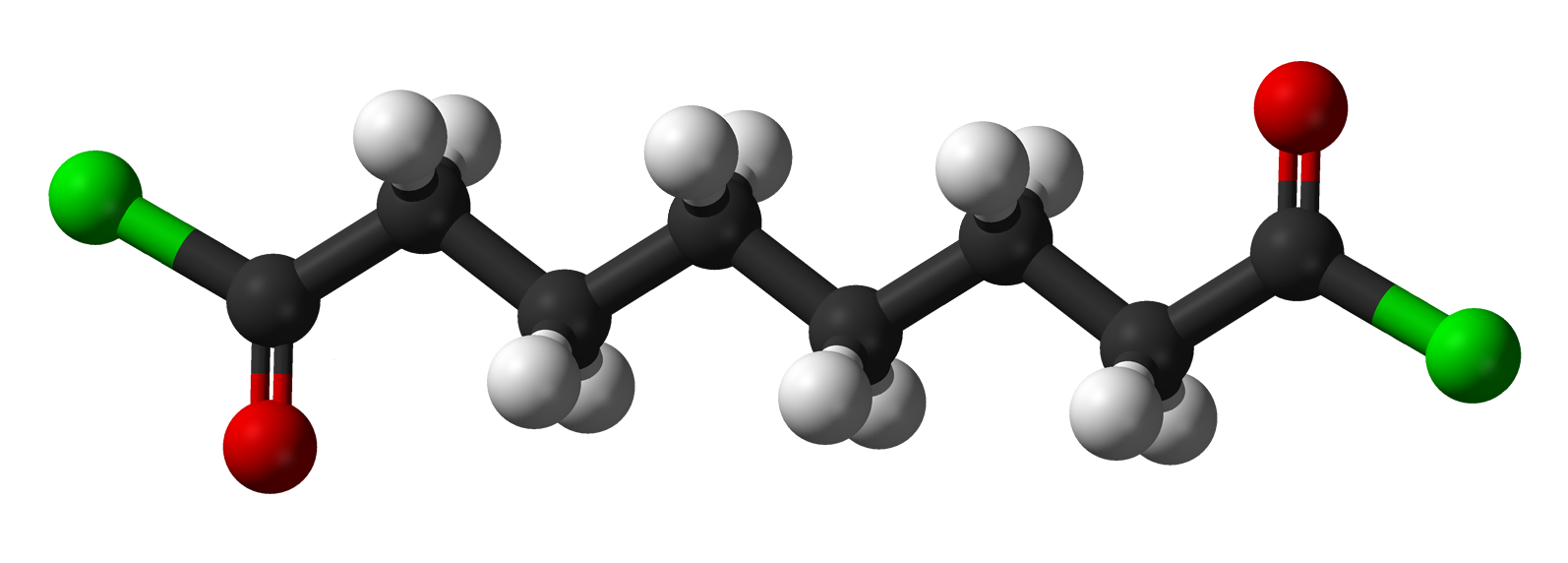

Names
- Preferred IUPAC name Octanedioyl dichloride
- Other names Suberoyl dichloride; Suberic acid chloride

Identifiers
| CAS Number | 10027-07-3 |
| 3D model (JSmol) | Interactive image |
| ChemSpider | 465767 |
| ECHA InfoCard | 100.156.463 |
| PubChem CID | 534653 |
| UNII | TG5X3247UL |
| CompTox Dashboard (EPA) | DTXSID10143078 |
- InChI: InChI=1S/C8H12Cl2O2/c9-7(11)5-3-1-2-4-6-8(10)12/h1-6H2 Key: PUIBKAHUQOOLSW-UHFFFAOYSA-N
- SMILES: C(CCCC(=O)Cl)CCC(=O)Cl

Properties
| Chemical formula | C_{8}H_{12}Cl_{2}O_{2} |
| Molar mass | 211.08 g·mol^{−1} |
| Density | 1.172 g/cm^{3} |
| Boiling point | 162–163 °C (324–325 °F; 435–436 K) |
| Solubility in water | Reacts with water |

Hazards
- GHS labelling
| Pictograms | (GHS05: Corrosive) |
| Signal word | Danger |
| Hazard statements | H314 |
| Precautionary statements | P260, P264, P280, P301+P330+P331, P303+P361+P353, P304+P340, P305+P351+P338, P310, P321, P363, P405, P501 |
| Flash point | 110 °C (230 °F; 383 K) |
- Except where otherwise noted, data are given for materials in their standard state (at 25 °C [77 °F], 100 kPa). Infobox references

Suberoyl chloride is an organic compound with the formula (CH_{2})_{6}(COCl)_{2}. It is the diacid chloride derivative of suberic acid. It is a colorless liquid although aged samples appear yellow or even brown.

== Uses ==
Suberoyl chloride is used as a reagent to synthesize hydroxyferrocifen hybrid compounds that have antiproliferative activity against triple negative breast cancer cells. It is also used as a cross-linking agent to cross-link chitosan membranes, and also improves the membrane's integrity.
