= Indigoidine =

Names
- Systematic IUPAC name (5E)-3-amino-5-(5-amino-2,6-dioxopyridin-3-ylidene)pyridine-2,6-dione

Identifiers
CAS Number	2435-59-8
3D model (JSmol)	Interactive image
ChEBI	CHEBI:79296
ChemSpider	4590923
PubChem CID	193349
- InChI: InChI=1S/C10H8N4O4/c11-5-1-3(7(15)13-9(5)17)4-2-6(12)10(18)14-8(4)16/h1-2,11H,12H2,(H,13,15,17)(H2,14,16,18) Key: YCZATMZTIWSFLZ-UHFFFAOYSA-N
- SMILES: C1=C(C(=O)NC(=O)C1=N)C2=C(NC(=O)C(=C2)N)O

Properties
Chemical formula	C_{10}H_{8}N_{4}O_{4}
Molar mass	248,19 g·mol^{−1}
Appearance	blue powder
- Except where otherwise noted, data are given for materials in their standard state (at 25 °C [77 °F], 100 kPa). Infobox references

Indigoidine is an organic compound of the azaquinone group. It is a blue pigment produced by some bacterial species that excrete it into the surrounding medium.

== History ==
An early report on indigo-blue pigment-producing bacteria was published by Heinr Claessen in 1890, describing a Bacillus isolated from water that produced an indigo-blue dye.

Otto Voges researched and described the bacterial species Bacillus indigoferus in 1893, renamed after him to Vogesella indigofera, in Kiel, which continuously discolored the surrounding medium (water) from slightly bluish (24 hours) to royal blue (48 hours).

In 1964 and 1965, Nobel laureate Richard Kuhn and his colleagues published several articles in the scientific press on the occurrence, structure and synthesis of indigoidine.

In 1979, Carl-Gerd Dieris and H.-D. Scharf described another synthesis of the compound.

== Occurrence ==
Indigoidine occurs in the following species of bacteria:

- Arthrobacter atrocyaneus
- Arthrobacter crystallopoietes
- Arthrobacter polychromogones
- Corynebacterium insidiosum
- Erwinia chrysanthemi renamed to Dickea dadantii
- Vogesella indigofera previously Bacillus indigoferus and Pseudomonas indigofera

== Synthesis ==
Indigoidine can be synthesized from citrazinic Acid (C_{6}H_{5}NO_{4}), which is itself produced from citric acid and ammonia.

=== Biosynthesis ===
The biosynthesis of indigoidine starts from glutamine, which is enzymatically oxidized, cyclized to the heterocycle and dimerized.

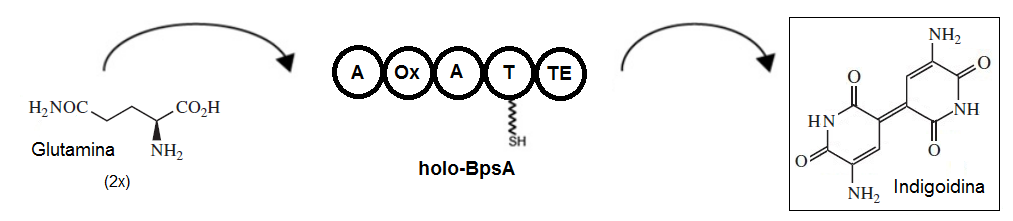
Biosynthesis of indigoidin

The names for the segments A, Ox, A, T and Te refer to defined domains within the enzyme structure of the bpsA gene product BPSA.

== Properties ==
=== Physical properties ===
Indigoidine is a blue amorphous powder that is insoluble in water and most other solvents, but dissolves in hydrochloric acid, producing a royal blue color, and in hot sulfuric acid, producing an orange-brown color.

=== Chemical properties ===
The color of indigoidine is attributed to an indigoid chromophore. NMR spectroscopic studies of derivatives confirmed the stated symmetrical structure. Because of the nitrogen atoms in the quinoid rings, indigoidine is classified as azaquinones.

=== Derivatives ===
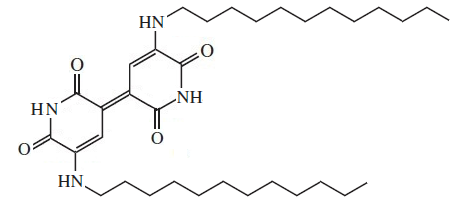
N^{5},N^{5′}-Didodecylindigoidine

A derivative is the violet pigment N^{5},N^{5′}-Didodecylindigoidine, (C_{34}H_{56}N_{4}O_{4}), which was isolated from the psychrophile bacteria Shewanella violacea DSS12.

== See also ==
- Indigo dye – C_{16}H_{10}N_{2}O_{2}
- Indigotin I – C_{16}H_{8}N_{2}Na_{2}O_{8}S_{2}

== Literature ==
- Carl-Gerd Dieris: Zur Frage der Luminiszenz von thermooxidativ geschädigten Polycarpolaktam. Eine neue Synthese des Bakterienfarbstoffes Indigoidin und seiner Tetra-N-alkylderivate. 1980.
- Hans Günter Schlegel: Allgemeine Mikrobiologie. Thieme Verlagsgruppe, Stuttgart 1992, ISBN 978-3-13-444607-4.
- Reverchon, Sylvie; Rouanet, Carine; Expert, Dominique; Nasser, William (2002-01-02). "Characterization of Indigoidine Biosynthetic Genes in Erwinia chrysanthemi and Role of This Blue Pigment in Pathogenicity". Journal of Bacteriology. 184 (3): 654–665. doi:10.1128/JB.184.3.654-665.2002. PMC 139515. PMID 11790734.
- Christin Schönfeld: Charakterisierung und biochemische Analyse der Indigoidin Synthease BpsA aus S. lavendulae ATCC 11924. Masterarbeit, Philipps-Universität Marburg 2012.
- M. Müller, S. Ausländer, D. Ausländer, C. Kemmer, M. Fussenegger: A novel reporter system for bacterial and mammalian cells based on the non-ribosomal peptide indigoidine. Metabolic Engineering 14/2012, S. 325–335 (doi:10.1016/j.ymben.2012.04.002).
- H. Kobayashi, Y. Nogi, K. Hirokoshi: New violet 3,3'-bipyridyl pigment purified from deep-sea microorganism Shewanella violacea DSS12. In: Extremophiles Nr. 11(2)/2012, S. 245–250. PMID 17102923.
