= C14H26O4 =

The molecular formula C_{14}H_{26}O_{4} may refer to:

- Diethyl sebacate
- Tetradecanedioic acid
- Valproate pivoxil
