= Isaac Rousseau =

Genevan watchmaker (1672–1747)

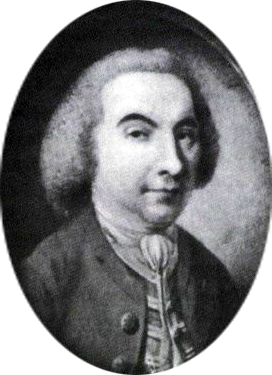
Rousseau before 1747

Isaac Rousseau (December 28, 1672 – May 9, 1747) was a Genevan master-clockmaker best known as the father of Jean-Jacques Rousseau.

== Life ==
He was born in Geneva, the son of Suzanne Cartier (1645–1705) and the master-clockmaker David Rousseau (October 2, 1641 – July 17, 1738), who was himself the son of the clockmaker Jean Rousseau (March 29, 1606 – May 26, 1684) and his wife Lydie Mussard (1613–1678). He had eleven siblings – one of his sisters, Clermonde Rousseau (1674–1747) married Antoine Fazy (1681–1731), son of Daniel Fazy, a Huguenot refugee from Saint-Véran, Queyras, who settled in Geneva and there set up the first Indian cotton factory in Europe.

He married Suzanne Bernard (1673, Geneva – 1712, Geneva) – she was the daughter of yet another clockmaker, Jacques Bernard. They had two sons, François Rousseau and the writer and philosopher Jean-Jacques Rousseau, though Suzanne died only nine days after Jean-Jacques's birth. An educated man and a patriot, Isaac seems to have been very attached to his son and educated him himself until he was aged ten, though he became more distant in the years that followed. In 1722 he was almost imprisoned thanks to a quarrel and he went into exile from Geneva, leaving his son in the care of Isaac's brother-in-law Gabriel Bernard. Isaac settled in Nyon, slightly to the north-east of Geneva, and remarried.

He then became one of the Genevan clockmakers who settled in the Ottoman Empire, where he was put in charge of regulating the pendulums in the Topkapi Palace – an important role, since these clocks regulated the exact time for Islamic prayers. Swiss clockmakers had been trading with the Ottomans via the French since the end of the 16th century, with a community in Galata, reserved for westerners since the time of Francis I of France.

He was widowed again in the 1720s but he does not seem to have been overly worried by his eldest son François Rousseau's flight from Geneva. Isaac and Jean-Jacques only met again four more times (July 1730, June 1732, July 1737 and September 1737, according to the Confessions), though Jean-Jacques still stated that he had been raised better than "kings' children". Isaac Rousseau died in Nyon.
