= Equisetolic acid =

Names
- IUPAC name triacontanedioic acid

Identifiers
CAS Number	6708-53-8
3D model (JSmol)	Interactive image
ChEBI	CHEBI:165389
ChemSpider	4479605
PubChem CID	5322010
CompTox Dashboard (EPA)	DTXSID30415789
- InChI: InChI=1S/C30H58O4/c31-29(32)27-25-23-21-19-17-15-13-11-9-7-5-3-1-2-4-6-8-10-12-14-16-18-20-22-24-26-28-30(33)34/h1-28H2,(H,31,32)(H,33,34) Key: JADFUOUIMWDTFX-UHFFFAOYSA-N
- SMILES: C(CCCCCCCCCCCCCCC(=O)O)CCCCCCCCCCCCCC(=O)O

Properties
Chemical formula	C_{30}H_{58}O_{4}
Molar mass	482.790 g·mol^{−1}
Melting point	108 °C
Solubility in water	poorly soluble
- Except where otherwise noted, data are given for materials in their standard state (at 25 °C [77 °F], 100 kPa). Infobox references

Equisetolic acid or triacontanedioic acid is a chemical compound with the chemical formula HO_{2}C(CH_{2})_{28}CO_{2}H. The compound is a long-chain dicarboxylic acid, one of the longest naturally occurring dicarboxylic acids. It has been found in the spores and cones of Equisetum arvense and Equisetum telmateia.

== Physical properties ==
Like other long-chain dicarboxylic acids, it demonstrates physical properties typical of fatty acids with extended carbon backbones, including high melting points and limited water solubility.
