= Glutaconaldehyde =

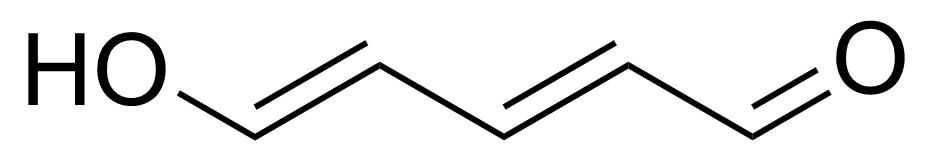

Names
- Preferred IUPAC name (2E,4E)-5-Hydroxypenta-2,4-dienal
- Other names Glutacondialdehyde; Glutaconic aldehyde; Glutaconic dialdehyde; Pentenedial

Identifiers
CAS Number	821-42-1
3D model (JSmol)	Interactive image
ChemSpider	4779496
PubChem CID	6011936
- InChI: InChI=1S/C5H6O2/c6-4-2-1-3-5-7/h1-6H/b3-1+,4-2+ Key: WFSXUTWNNVIIIG-ZPUQHVIOSA-N; InChI=1/C5H6O2/c6-4-2-1-3-5-7/h1-6H/b3-1+,4-2+ Key: WFSXUTWNNVIIIG-ZPUQHVIOBI
- SMILES: O=C\C=C\C=C\O

Properties
Chemical formula	C_{5}H_{6}O_{2}
Molar mass	98.101 g·mol^{−1}
- Except where otherwise noted, data are given for materials in their standard state (at 25 °C [77 °F], 100 kPa). verify (what is ?) Infobox references

Glutaconaldehyde is an organic compound with the formula C_{5}H_{6}O_{2}. It is an unsaturated dialdehyde as is related to glutaraldehyde and glutaconic acid, but exists in its enol form due to the conjugation with the double bond.

Both the sodium and potassium salts of glutaconaldehyde are known. They are efficiently synthesized from pyridinium sulfonate.

The reaction of the glutaconaldehyde anion with acid chlorides gives the corresponding enol esters. Glutaconaldehyde can also be converted to the corresponding vinyl bromide as shown below. This product can be reacted with nucleophiles, cross-coupled using palladium, or homologated by two carbons.

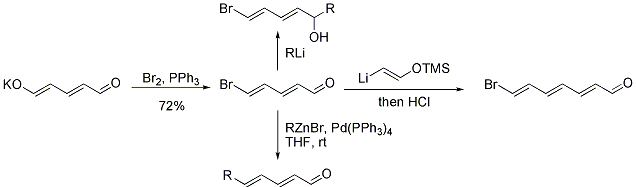
