= Aconitate Delta-isomerase =

Class of enzymes

Aconitate Δ-isomerase

Identifiers
- EC no.: 5.3.3.7
- CAS no.: 37318-48-2

Databases
- IntEnz: IntEnz view
- BRENDA: BRENDA entry
- ExPASy: NiceZyme view
- KEGG: KEGG entry
- MetaCyc: metabolic pathway
- PRIAM: profile
- PDB structures: RCSB PDB PDBe PDBsum
- Gene Ontology: AmiGO / QuickGO
Search
- PMC: articles
- PubMed: articles
- NCBI: proteins

In enzymology, an aconitate Δ-isomerase (EC 5.3.3.7) is an enzyme that catalyzes the chemical reaction

trans-aconitate $\rightleftharpoons$ cis-aconitate

Hence, this enzyme has one substrate, trans-aconitate, and one product, cis-aconitate.

This enzyme belongs to the family of isomerases, specifically those intramolecular oxidoreductases transposing C=C bonds. The systematic name of this enzyme class is aconitate Delta2-Delta3-isomerase. This enzyme is also called aconitate isomerase.
