= Tetradecanedioic acid =

Names
- Other names Tetradecane-1,14-dioic acid

Identifiers
CAS Number	821-38-5
3D model (JSmol)	Interactive image
ChEBI	CHEBI:76308
ChemSpider	12630
ECHA InfoCard	100.011.342
EC Number	212-476-9
PubChem CID	13185
UNII	UEC3AC47H1
CompTox Dashboard (EPA)	DTXSID5061166
- InChI: InChI=1S/C14H26O4/c15-13(16)11-9-7-5-3-1-2-4-6-8-10-12-14(17)18/h1-12H2,(H,15,16)(H,17,18) Key: HQHCYKULIHKCEB-UHFFFAOYSA-N
- SMILES: C(CCCCCCC(=O)O)CCCCCC(=O)O

Properties
Chemical formula	C_{14}H_{26}O_{4}
Molar mass	258.358 g·mol^{−1}
Density	1.04 g/cm^{3}
Melting point	127 °C (261 °F; 400 K)

Hazards
- GHS labelling
Pictograms	(GHS05: Corrosive) (GHS07: Exclamation mark)
Signal word	Danger
Hazard statements	H315, H318, H319, H335
Precautionary statements	P261, P264, P264+P265, P271, P280, P302+P352, P304+P340, P305+P351+P338, P305+P354+P338, P317, P319, P321, P332+P317, P337+P317, P362+P364, P403+P233, P405, P501
- Except where otherwise noted, data are given for materials in their standard state (at 25 °C [77 °F], 100 kPa). Infobox references

Tetradecanedioic acid is an organic compound with the formula (CH_{2})_{12}(CO_{2}H)_{2}. It is a colorless solid. As a 14-carbon dicarboxylic acid, it is a potential precursor to polyesters.

The compound is of historic interest in the context of the Leopold Ružička's synthesis of large ring ketones. It was first prepared by hydrolysis of the dinitrile (CH_{2})_{12}(CN)_{2}, which was in turn obtained from 1,12-dibromododecane. It was subsequently synthesized from dihydroresorcinol (1,3-cyclohexanedione).
