= Glutaconic acid =

trans
cis
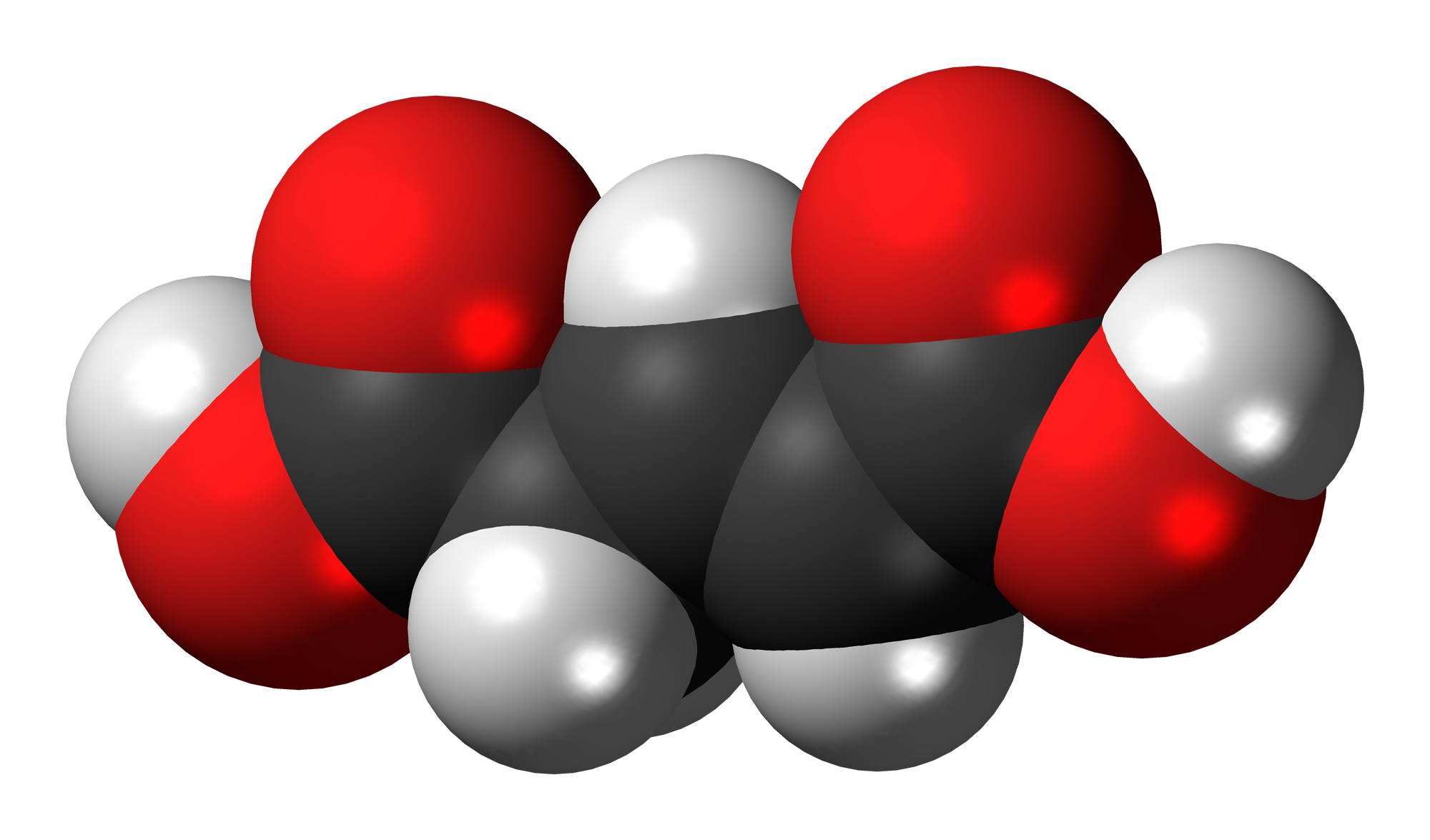

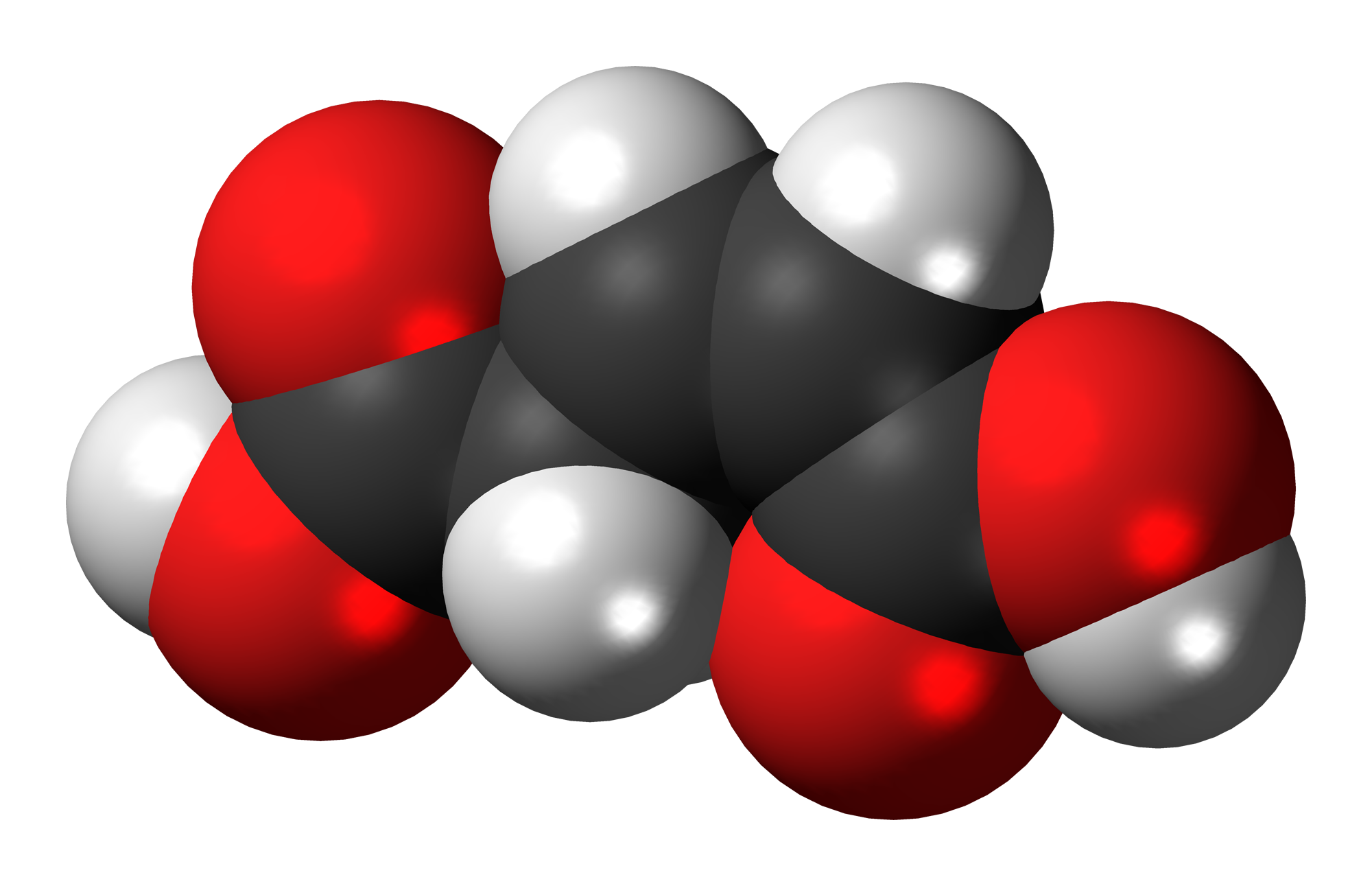

Names
- IUPAC name Pent-2-enedioic acid

Identifiers
CAS Number	1724-02-3 (unspecified); 628-48-8 (trans); 505-36-2 (cis)
3D model (JSmol)	Interactive image
ChEBI	CHEBI:15670
ChEMBL	ChEMBL557347
ChemSpider	4444138
PubChem CID	5280498
UNII	NOH8K33D47
CompTox Dashboard (EPA)	DTXSID70211883
- InChI: InChI=1S/C5H6O4/c6-4(7)2-1-3-5(8)9/h1-2H,3H2,(H,6,7)(H,8,9)/b2-1+ Key: XVOUMQNXTGKGMA-OWOJBTEDSA-N; InChI=1/C5H6O4/c6-4(7)2-1-3-5(8)9/h1-2H,3H2,(H,6,7)(H,8,9)/b2-1+ Key: XVOUMQNXTGKGMA-OWOJBTEDBR
- SMILES: O=C(O)\C=C\CC(=O)O

Properties
Chemical formula	C_{5}H_{6}O_{4}
Molar mass	130.099 g/mol
Appearance	Colorless solid
Melting point	137 to 139 °C (279 to 282 °F; 410 to 412 K)
- Except where otherwise noted, data are given for materials in their standard state (at 25 °C [77 °F], 100 kPa). verify (what is ?) Infobox references

trans-Glutaconic acid is an organic compound with formula HO_{2}CCH=CHCH_{2}CO_{2}H. This dicarboxylic acid exists as a colorless solid and is related to the saturated chemical glutaric acid, HO_{2}CC(CH_{2})_{3}CO_{2}H. Esters and salts of glutaconic acid are called glutaconates.

Glutaconate bound to coenzyme A, glutaconyl-CoA, is an intermediate in lysine metabolism.

== Related compounds ==
The geometric isomer, cis-glutaconic acid, has a noticeably lower melting point (130–132 °C). It can be prepared by bromination of levulinic acid followed by treatment of the dibromoketone with potassium carbonate.

Glutaconic anhydride, which forms by dehydrating the diacid, exists mainly as the dicarbonyl tautomer in solution. It is a colorless solid melting at 77–82 °C. Either the cis or trans diacid can be used to make it: the trans form isomerizes under the reaction conditions.

Glutaconaldehyde is the corresponding dialdehyde.

== Medical aspects ==
Glutaric, 3-hydroxyglutaric, and glutaconic acids are structurally related metabolites. In glutaric aciduria type 1, glutaconic acid accumulates, resulting in brain damage.
