= Suberic acid =

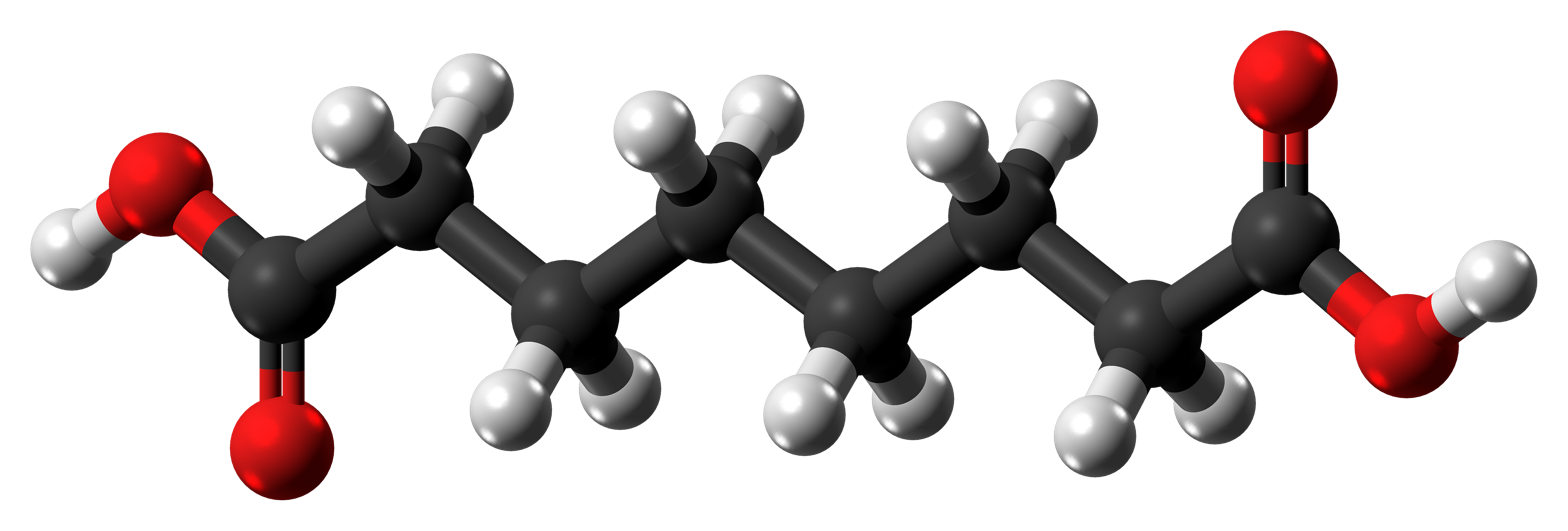

Names
- Preferred IUPAC name Octanedioic acid

Identifiers
CAS Number	505-48-6
3D model (JSmol)	Interactive image
ChEBI	CHEBI:9300
ChEMBL	ChEMBL1162491
ChemSpider	10025
ECHA InfoCard	100.007.283
PubChem CID	10457
UNII	6U7Y4M9C1H
CompTox Dashboard (EPA)	DTXSID8021644
- InChI: InChI=1S/C8H14O4/c9-7(10)5-3-1-2-4-6-8(11)12/h1-6H2,(H,9,10)(H,11,12) Key: TYFQFVWCELRYAO-UHFFFAOYSA-N; InChI=1/C8H14O4/c9-7(10)5-3-1-2-4-6-8(11)12/h1-6H2,(H,9,10)(H,11,12) Key: TYFQFVWCELRYAO-UHFFFAOYAN
- SMILES: O=C(O)CCCCCCC(=O)O

Properties
Chemical formula	C_{8}H_{14}O_{4}
Molar mass	174.196 g·mol^{−1}
Density	1.272 g/cm^{3}
Melting point	141–144 °C (286–291 °F; 414–417 K)
Boiling point	230 °C (446 °F; 503 K) (15 mmHg)
Solubility in water	2.46 g/L
Acidity (pK_{a})	4.526, 5.498
- Except where otherwise noted, data are given for materials in their standard state (at 25 °C [77 °F], 100 kPa). verify (what is ?) Infobox references

Suberic acid, also octanedioic acid, is a dicarboxylic acid, with formula HO_{2}C(CH_{2})_{6}CO_{2}H. It is a colorless crystalline solid used in drug syntheses and plastics manufacture. Its name is derived from the Latin word suber which means cork.
