= Citrazinic acid =

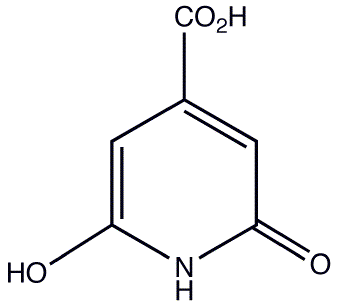

Names
- Preferred IUPAC name 6-Hydroxy-2-oxo-1,2-dihydropyridine-4-carboxylic acid
- Other names 2,6-Dihydroxyisonicotinic acid; 2,6-Dihydroxypyridine-4-carboxylic acid

Identifiers
CAS Number	99-11-6
3D model (JSmol)	Interactive image
ChEBI	CHEBI:CHEBI:184700
ChemSpider	7147
ECHA InfoCard	100.002.483
EC Number	202-731-2
MeSH	acid Citrazinic acid
PubChem CID	7425
RTECS number	NS1400000
UNII	N8Q4XFV86A
CompTox Dashboard (EPA)	DTXSID3059185
- InChI: InChI=1S/C6H5NO4/c8-4-1-3(6(10)11)2-5(9)7-4/h1-2H,(H,10,11)(H2,7,8,9) Key: CSGQJHQYWJLPKY-UHFFFAOYSA-N
- SMILES: O=C(O)C=1\C=C(\O)NC(=O)C=1

Properties
Chemical formula	C_{6}H_{5}NO_{4}
Molar mass	155.109 g·mol^{−1}
Appearance	yellow powder
Melting point	>300 °C (decomp.)
Solubility in water	Slightly soluble
Solubility	Slightly soluble in methanol, DMSO, acidic solutions Very soluble in alkaline solutions

Hazards
- GHS labelling
Pictograms	(GHS07: Exclamation mark)
Signal word	Warning
Hazard statements	H315, H319, H335
Precautionary statements	P261, P280, P305+P351+P338
NFPA 704 (fire diamond)	2 0 0
- Lethal dose or concentration (LD, LC)
LD_{50} (median dose)	> 3200 mg/kg ( Rat )
- Except where otherwise noted, data are given for materials in their standard state (at 25 °C [77 °F], 100 kPa). verify (what is ?) Infobox references

Citrazinic acid (CZA) is a heterocyclic compound consisting of a dihydropyridine ring derived with a carboxylate group. The yellow solid exists as multiple tautomers, and it frequently forms dimers.

Citrazinic acid is commonly formed in citric acid based carbon nanodots (CND). It is responsible for the blue light found in citric acid CNDs. The wavelengths of light emitted by citrazinic in CNDs can be shifted by changing the pH of the solution.

== Preparation ==
Citrazinic acid can be prepared creating a solution of citric acid and toluenesulfonic acid, which forms a 1,3-diester. That solution, when added to a heated ammonia solution results in citrazinic acid.
