= NFKBIZ =

Protein-coding gene in the species Homo sapiens

Identifiers
- Aliases: NFKBIZ, IKBZ, INAP, MAIL, NFKB inhibitor zeta
- External IDs: OMIM: 608004; MGI: 1931595; GeneCards: NFKBIZ

Gene location (Human)
Chr.	Chromosome 3 (human)
Band	3q12.3	Start	101,827,991 bp
Band	3q12.3	End	101,861,022 bp

Gene location (Mouse)
Chr.	Chromosome 16 (mouse)
Band	16|16 C1.1	Start	55,631,738 bp
Band	16|16 C1.1	End	55,659,262 bp
RNA expression pattern
Bgee	Human / Mouse (ortholog); Top expressed in: pancreatic epithelial cell; pancreatic ductal cell; palpebral conjunctiva; skin of thigh; parietal pleura; trachea; visceral pleura; bone marrow cell; gastric mucosa; nasal epithelium / Top expressed in: granulocyte; Paneth cell; islet of Langerhans; conjunctival fornix; mucous cell of stomach; stroma of bone marrow; left lung lobe; jejunum; duodenum; primary oocyte; More reference expression data
BioGPS	n/a
Gene ontology
Molecular function	protein binding; transcription coregulator activity
Cellular component	nucleus; nuclear speck; cytoplasmic ribonucleoprotein granule
Biological process	regulation of transcription by RNA polymerase II; inflammatory response; regulation of transcription, DNA-templated; transcription, DNA-templated; T cell receptor signaling pathway; positive regulation of T-helper 17 cell differentiation; positive regulation of inflammatory response
Sources:Amigo / QuickGO
Orthologs
Databases	NCBI: entry; OMA: entry
Species	Human	Mouse
Entrez	64332	80859
Ensembl	ENSG00000144802	ENSMUSG00000035356
UniProt	Q9BYH8	Q9EST8
RefSeq (mRNA)	NM_031419; NM_001005474	NM_001159394; NM_001159395; NM_030612
RefSeq (protein)	NP_001005474; NP_113607	NP_001152866; NP_001152867; NP_085115
Location (UCSC)	Chr 3: 101.83 – 101.86 Mb	Chr 16: 55.63 – 55.66 Mb
PubMed search
- Wikidata
View/Edit Human	View/Edit Mouse

NF-kappa-B inhibitor zeta (IκBζ) is a protein that in humans is encoded by the NFKBIZ gene. This gene is a member of the ankyrin-repeat family and is induced by lipopolysaccharide (LPS). The C-terminal portion of the encoded product which contains the ankyrin repeats, shares high sequence similarity with the I kappa B family of proteins. The latter are known to play a role in inflammatory responses to LPS by their interaction with NF-κB proteins through ankyrin-repeat domains. Studies in mouse indicate that this gene product is one of the nuclear I kappa B proteins and an activator of IL-6 production. Two transcript variants encoding different isoforms have been found for this gene.

== Clinical relevance ==
NFKBIZ has been implicated as an oncogene in diffuse large B-cell lymphoma (DLBCL). Specifically, genomic locus containing this gene is recurrently amplified in copy number in the activated B-cell (ABC) subgroup of DLBCL. More recently, a recurrence of somatic mutations affecting the 3-prime untranslated region of NFKBIZ were found to promote NFKBIZ expression in ABC DLBCL.

IκBζ is required for expression of the SASP CCL2 (MCP1) cytokine, which recruits macrophages to remove cancer cells.

The flavonoid apigenin has been shown to reduce gene expression of IκBζ.
