= Vogesella indigofera =

Scientific classification
- Domain: Bacteria
- Kingdom: Pseudomonadati
- Phylum: Pseudomonadota
- Class: Betaproteobacteria
- Order: Neisseriales
- Family: Chromobacteriaceae
- Genus: Vogesella
- Species: V. indigofera

Binomial name
- Vogesella indigofera (Voges 1893) Grimes et al. 1997

Synonyms
- Bacillus indigoferus Voges 1893; Pseudomonas indigofera (Voges 1893) Migula 1900

Species of bacterium

Vogesella indigofera is a strictly aerobic, Gram-negative bacterium. V. indigofera produces a blue pigment (indigoidin) and the colonies develop a metallic copper sheen upon extended incubation (greater than 24 hours). This organism is not known to be pathogenic and is commonly found in freshwater.
