= Huh7 =

Immortalised cell line

Huh7 is an immortalised cell line that is grown in the laboratory for research purposes. It is described as a hepatocyte-derived carcinoma cell line, originally taken from a liver tumor in a 57-year-old Japanese male in 1982. It is used extensively in hepatitis C and dengue virus research.

Huh7 cells have been instrumental in hepatitis C research. Until 2005, it was not possible to culture hepatitis C in the laboratory. The introduction of the Huh7 cell line permitted screening of drug candidates against laboratory-cultured hepatitis C virus and permitted the development of new drugs against hepatitis C.

In February 2022 it was reported that the Huh7 cells can reverse transcribe at least parts of the code of the mRNA from the BNT162b2 vaccine into DNA (the study doesn't prove that that DNA is integrated).
