= Citramalic acid =

Names
- Other names (R)-2-hydroxy-2-methylbutanedioic acid, 2-methylmalic acid, D-(−)-2-methylmalic acid, (R)-2-hydroxy-2-methylsuccinic acid

Identifiers
CAS Number	6236-10-8 R-enantiomer
3D model (JSmol)	Interactive image
ChEBI	CHEBI:15586
ChemSpider	388822
ECHA InfoCard	100.154.104
EC Number	±: 209-901-5
KEGG	C02612
PubChem CID	439766
UNII	788CNO6T4D
CompTox Dashboard (EPA)	DTXSID80331440
- InChI: InChI=1S/C5H8O5/c1-5(10,4(8)9)2-3(6)7/h10H,2H2,1H3,(H,6,7)(H,8,9)/t5-/m1/s1 Key: XFTRTWQBIOMVPK-RXMQYKEDSA-N
- SMILES: C[C@@](CC(=O)O)(C(=O)O)O

Properties
Chemical formula	C_{5}H_{8}O_{5}
Molar mass	148.114 g·mol^{−1}
Appearance	white solid

Hazards
- GHS labelling
Pictograms	(GHS07: Exclamation mark)
Signal word	Warning
Hazard statements	H315, H319, H335
Precautionary statements	P261, P264, P271, P280, P302+P352, P304+P340, P305+P351+P338, P312, P321, P332+P313, P337+P313, P362, P403+P233, P405, P501
- Except where otherwise noted, data are given for materials in their standard state (at 25 °C [77 °F], 100 kPa). Infobox references

Citramalic acid is the organic compound with the formula HO_{2}CCH_{2}C(CH_{3})(OH)CO_{2}H. A chiral compound, it is related structurally to malic acid.

== Synthesis and reactions ==
Citramalic acid is the hydrated derivative of mesaconic acid, The hydration is catalyzed by mesaconyl-C4-CoA hydratase:

HO_{2}CCH=C(CH_{3})CO_{2}H + H_{2}O → HO_{2}CCH_{2}C(CH_{3})(OH)CO_{2}H

The same conversion can be achieved in vitro.

The enzyme (S)-citramalyl-CoA lyase converts citramalyl-CoA to acetyl-CoA and pyruvate.
