= Jacques Peschier =

Swiss pharmacist and chemist

- Born: 6 July 1769; Geneva
- Died: 7 January 1832 (aged 62); Geneva
- Occupations: Pharmacist, chemist
- Spouse: Jeanne-Claire Fazy (m. 1796)
- Parent(s): Charles-Antoine Peschier; Jacqueline Laurens

Jacques Peschier (6 July 1769 – 7 January 1832) was a Swiss pharmacist and chemist from Geneva. He made significant contributions to pharmaceutical chemistry, including the discovery of aconitic acid and the development of an effective treatment for tapeworm infection.

== Early life and education ==
Peschier was born on 6 July 1769 in Geneva, the son of Charles-Antoine Peschier, a pharmacist, and Jacqueline Laurens. He was Protestant and a citizen of Geneva. In 1796, he married Jeanne-Claire Fazy, daughter of Jean-Louis Fazy, an indiennes manufacturer, and granddaughter of Antoine Fazy.

Peschier began his studies in philology in 1786, followed by philosophy in 1788, both in Geneva. He then traveled to Berlin to study pharmacy and chemistry. After passing his pharmacist examination in Geneva in 1795, he took over his father's pharmacy in 1817.

== Scientific contributions ==
Peschier's ethereal extract of fern root proved highly effective in combating tapeworm. He discovered aconitic acid and succeeded in isolating krameric acid from rhatany. He also confirmed Antoine-Laurent de Lavoisier's experiment of heating mercury(II) oxide to produce oxygen (1792). Peschier isolated titanium, analyzed the mineral springs of Schinznach and Yverdon, and examined the effect of acids on salicin. He also prepared homeopathic dilutions.

== Professional memberships ==
Peschier became a member of the Société de Physique et d'Histoire Naturelle de Genève in 1816 and an ordinary member of the Société des Arts in Geneva in 1819.

== Death ==
Peschier died on 7 January 1832 in Geneva.
