= Antoine Fazy =

Genevan industrialist (c. 1681 – 1731)

- Born: c. 1681; Saint-Véran, France
- Died: 23 April 1731; Geneva, Republic of Geneva
- Occupation: Industrialist
- Known for: Establishing Geneva's printed cotton industry
- Spouse: Priscille Du Pouy (m. 1704) Suzanne Bouverot (m. 1718) Clermonde Rousseau
- Children: Jean Fazy; Jean-Salomon Fazy
- Parent(s): Daniel Fazy; Marguerite Vasserot

Antoine Fazy (c. 1681 – 23 April 1731) was a Huguenot industrialist in Geneva who played a central role in establishing the city's printed cotton industry. He was granted resident status (habitant) in 1702.

== Biography ==
Antoine Fazy was born around 1681, the son of Daniel Fazy and Marguerite Vasserot, originally from Saint-Véran. He married three times: first to Priscille Du Pouy, a refugee, in 1704; second to Suzanne Bouverot in 1718, daughter of Jean Bouverot, a canvas bleacher and refugee from Pont-de-Veyle; and third to Clermonde Rousseau, a citizen of Geneva and aunt of Jean-Jacques Rousseau.

In 1701, Fazy entered the indiennes printing factory at Eaux-Vives that had been established ten years earlier by his uncle Daniel Vasserot. In 1710, he established his own factory at Pâquis, which would later be taken over by his second son, Jean-Salomon Fazy. In 1728, his eldest son, Jean Fazy, founded a factory at Bergues in Saint-Gervais.

He was the grandfather of Jacques Peschier, a Swiss pharmacist and chemist.

== Legacy ==
Geneva owes the establishment of its printed cotton industry to this family network centered around the Vasserot family, Antoine Fazy, and other refugees from the Queyras valley in Dauphiné.

== Bibliography ==
- Deonna, Henry: "Une industrie genevoise de jadis. Les indiennes", in: Genava. Bulletin du Musée d'art et d'histoire, 8, 1930, pp. 185–245, especially pp. 199–204.
