= Docosanedioic acid =

Chemical compound

Names
- Preferred IUPAC name Docosanedioic acid
- Other names Felogenic acid; Phelogenic acid; Phellogenic acid; 1,22-Docosanedoic acid; 1,20-Eicosanedicarboxylic acid

Identifiers
CAS Number	505-56-6
3D model (JSmol)	Interactive image
ChemSpider	214170
ECHA InfoCard	100.127.871
PubChem CID	244872
UNII	FR7J081T20
CompTox Dashboard (EPA)	DTXSID20198519
- InChI: InChI=1S/C22H42O4/c23-21(24)19-17-15-13-11-9-7-5-3-1-2-4-6-8-10-12-14-16-18-20-22(25)26/h1-20H2,(H,23,24)(H,25,26) Key: DGXRZJSPDXZJFG-UHFFFAOYSA-N
- SMILES: C(CCCCCCCCCCC(=O)O)CCCCCCCCCC(=O)O

Properties
Chemical formula	C_{22}H_{42}O_{4}
Molar mass	370.574 g·mol^{−1}
Appearance	White solid
Density	0.972 g/cm^{3}
Melting point	119–125 °C (246–257 °F; 392–398 K)
Boiling point	527 °C (981 °F; 800 K)
Solubility in water	Insoluble in water

Hazards
Flash point	286.6 °C (547.9 °F; 559.8 K)
- Except where otherwise noted, data are given for materials in their standard state (at 25 °C [77 °F], 100 kPa). verify (what is ?) Infobox references

Docosanedioic acid is a dicarboxylic acid with the linear formula HO_{2}C(CH_{2})_{20}CO_{2}H.

== Uses ==
Docosanedioic acid finds uses in organic chemistry and is a starting material for ultrasound contrast agents. It is also used to produce the fluffy white solid 1,22-docosanediol, which in turn is a precursor to 1,22-bis-2-(trimethylammonium)ethylphospatyldocosane, a phosphocholine derivative with antifungal activity.

== Synthesis ==
Disodium 7,16-diketodocosanedioate is reacted with triethanolamine, hydrazine hydrate, potassium hydroxide and a little hydrochloric acid to afford docosanedioic acid via a Wolff–Kishner reduction.

Alternately, 2,5-bis(ω-carboyoctyl)thiophene is desulfurized with Raney nickel to afford docosanedioic acid.

It can also be produced through oxidative coupling of 10-undecynoic acid to docosa-10,12-diynedoic acid and reduction of this intermediate with a palladium catalyst.
