= Mesaconic acid =

- Skeletal formula

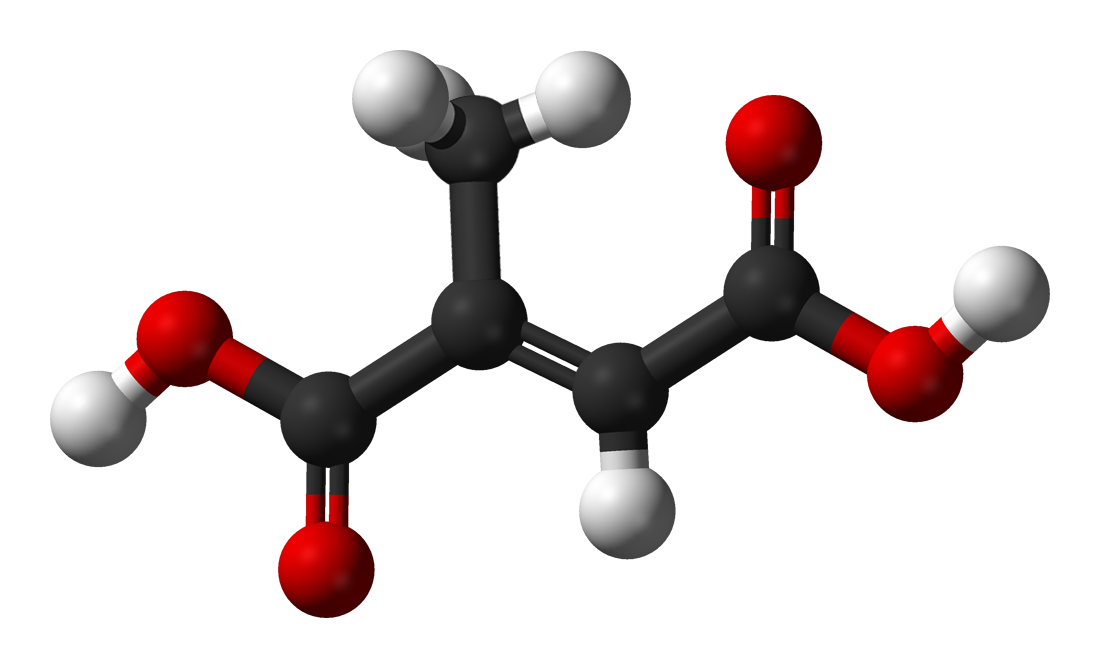
- Ball-and-stick model

Names
- Preferred IUPAC name (2E)-2-Methylbut-2-enedioic acid

Identifiers
CAS Number	498-24-8
3D model (JSmol)	Interactive image
ChEBI	CHEBI:16600
ChemSpider	10289044
ECHA InfoCard	100.007.146
EC Number	207-859-2
KEGG	C01732
PubChem CID	638129
UNII	90UTM639KK
CompTox Dashboard (EPA)	DTXSID10883407
- InChI: InChI=1S/C5H6O4/c1-3(5(8)9)2-4(6)7/h2H,1H3,(H,6,7)(H,8,9)/b3-2+ Key: HNEGQIOMVPPMNR-NSCUHMNNSA-N; InChI=1/C5H6O4/c1-3(5(8)9)2-4(6)7/h2H,1H3,(H,6,7)(H,8,9)/b3-2+ Key: HNEGQIOMVPPMNR-NSCUHMNNBN
- SMILES: OC(/C(C)=C/C(O)=O)=O

Properties
Chemical formula	C_{5}H_{6}O_{4}
Molar mass	130.10 g/mol
Density	1.31 g/cm^{3}
Melting point	204 to 205 °C (399 to 401 °F; 477 to 478 K)
Boiling point	250 °C (482 °F; 523 K) (decomposes)

Hazards
- GHS labelling
Pictograms	(GHS07: Exclamation mark)
Signal word	Warning
Hazard statements	H315, H319, H335
Precautionary statements	P261, P264, P271, P280, P302+P352, P304+P340, P305+P351+P338, P312, P321, P332+P313, P337+P313, P362, P403+P233, P405, P501
- Except where otherwise noted, data are given for materials in their standard state (at 25 °C [77 °F], 100 kPa). verify (what is ?) Infobox references

Mesaconic acid is one of several isomeric carboxylic acids obtained from citric acid. It is a colorless solid.

== Synthesis and reactions ==
It is prepared from citric acid, which is first converted to itaconic anhydride by dehydration and decarboxylation. Itaconic acid anhydride is isomerized to citraconic anhydride, which is hydrolyzed and the resulting acid further isomerized under acid-catalysis to give mesaconic acid.

Hydration of mesaconic acid, a conversion catalyzed by mesaconyl-C4-CoA hydratase, gives citramalic acid.

== History ==
This acid was studied for the first time by Jacobus H. van 't Hoff in 1874. It was later shown to be produced by Clostridium tetanomorphum. Further studies showed that this organic compound is involved in the biosynthesis of vitamin B12. It is a competitive inhibitor of fumarate reduction.

The compound has been considered as a renewable precursor to the commodity chemical methacrylic acid.
