= Citraconic acid =

Names
- Preferred IUPAC name (2Z)-2-Methylbut-2-enedioic acid
- Other names 2-Methylmaleic acid Citraconate; Methylmaleic acid cis-Methylbutenedioic acid

Identifiers
CAS Number	498-23-7
3D model (JSmol)	Interactive image
ChEBI	CHEBI:17626
ChemSpider	553689
DrugBank	DB04734
ECHA InfoCard	100.007.145
EC Number	207-858-7
KEGG	C02226
PubChem CID	643798
UNII	0RQ6CXO9KD
CompTox Dashboard (EPA)	DTXSID601019903
- InChI: InChI=1S/C5H6O4/c1-3(5(8)9)2-4(6)7/h2H,1H3,(H,6,7)(H,8,9)/b3-2- Key: HNEGQIOMVPPMNR-IHWYPQMZSA-N
- SMILES: O=C(O)\C=C(/C(=O)O)C

Properties
Chemical formula	C_{5}H_{6}O_{4}
Molar mass	130.099 g·mol^{−1}
Appearance	Monoclinic crystals
Density	1.62 g/cm3
Melting point	~90 °C (decomposition)
Solubility in water	Freely soluble

Hazards
- GHS labelling
Pictograms	(GHS07: Exclamation mark)
Signal word	Warning
Hazard statements	H302
Precautionary statements	P264, P270, P301+P312, P330, P501
- Except where otherwise noted, data are given for materials in their standard state (at 25 °C [77 °F], 100 kPa). verify (what is ?) Infobox references

Citraconic acid is an organic compound with the formula CH_{3}C_{2}H(CO_{2}H)_{2}. It is a white solid. The alkene is cis. The related trans alkene is called mesaconic acid. It is one of the pyrocitric acids formed upon the heating of citric acid. Citraconic acid can be produced, albeit inefficiently, by oxidation of xylene and methylbutanols. The acid displays the unusual property of spontaneously forming the anhydride, which, unlike maleic anhydride, is a liquid at room temperature.

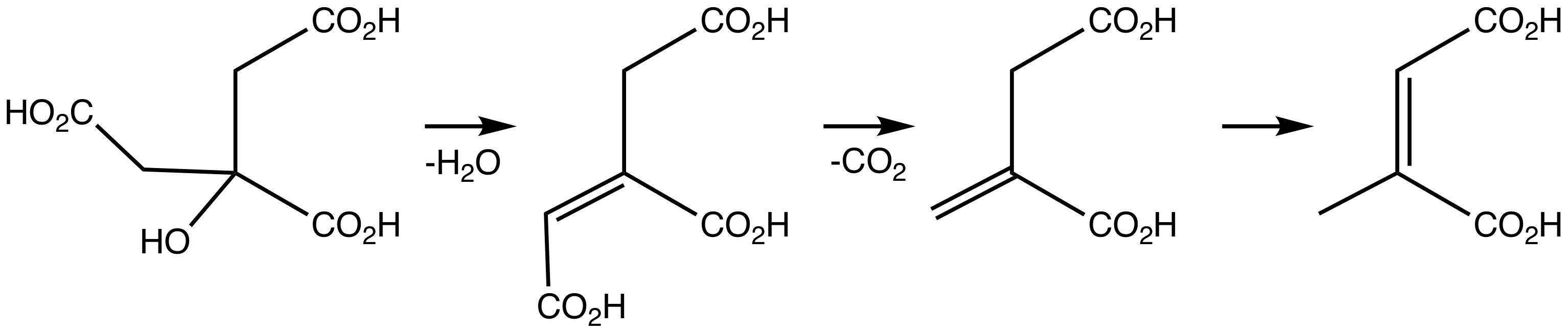
Steps in conversion of citric acid to citraconic acid.

In the laboratory, citraconic acid can be produced by thermal isomerization of itaconic acid anhydride to give citraconic anhydride, which can be hydrolyzed to citraconic acid. The required itaconic acid anhydride is obtained by dry distillation of citric acid.
