= Aconitic acid =

- cis-aconitic acid

- trans-aconitic acid

Names
- Preferred IUPAC name Prop-1-ene-1,2,3-tricarboxylic acid
- Other names Achilleic acid; equisetic acid; citridinic acid; pyrocitric acid; achilleaic acid; acinitic acid

Identifiers
CAS Number	499-12-7; 585-84-2 (cis); 4023-65-8 (trans)
ChemSpider	303 (cis)
ECHA InfoCard	100.007.162
PubChem CID	309 (cis and trans)
UNII	93371T1BXP; OF5471ZHRR (cis); 7DB37960CW (trans)
CompTox Dashboard (EPA)	DTXSID9060102
- InChI: InChI=1S/C4H8/c1-3-4-2/h3-4H,1-2H3 Key: GTZCVFVGUGFEME-UHFFFAOYSA-N; InChI=1/C6H6O6/c7-4(8)1-3(6(11)12)2-5(9)10/h1H,2H2,(H,7,8)(H,9,10)(H,11,12) Key: GTZCVFVGUGFEME-UHFFFAOYAL

Properties
Chemical formula	C_{6}H_{6}O_{6}
Molar mass	174.108 g·mol^{−1}
Appearance	Colorless crystals
Melting point	190 °C (374 °F; 463 K) (decomposes) (mixed isomers), 173 °C (cis and trans isomers)
Acidity (pK_{a})	2.80, 4.46 (trans isomer) 2.78, 4.41, 6.21 (cis isomer)
- Except where otherwise noted, data are given for materials in their standard state (at 25 °C [77 °F], 100 kPa). verify (what is ?) Infobox references

Aconitic acid refers to organic compounds with the formula HO_{2}CCH_{2}C(CO_{2}H)=CHCO_{2}H. A white solid, it is classified as a tricarboxylic acid. The two isomers are cis-aconitic acid and trans-aconitic acid. The conjugate base of cis-aconitic acid, cis-aconitate is an intermediate in the isomerization of citrate to isocitrate in the citric acid cycle. It is acted upon by the enzyme aconitase.

Aconitic acid can be synthesized by dehydration of citric acid using sulfuric acid:

(HO_{2}CCH_{2})_{2}C(OH)CO_{2}H → HO_{2}CCH=C(CO_{2}H)CH_{2}CO_{2}H + H_{2}O

A mixture of isomers is generated in this way.

Aconitic acid was originally isolated from Aconitum napellus by Swiss chemist and apothecary Jacques Peschier in 1820. It was first prepared by thermal dehydration.

Like the conjugate bases of other polycarboxylic acid, acotinic acid forms a variety of coordination complexes. One example is the coordination polymer [Zn_{3}(C_{6}H_{3}O_{6})_{2}(H_{2}O)_{6}]_{n}.
