= Highly hazardous chemical =

A highly hazardous chemical, also called a harsh chemical, is a substance classified by the American Occupational Safety and Health Administration as material that is both toxic and reactive and whose potential for human injury is high if released. Highly hazardous chemicals may cause cancer, birth defects, induce genetic damage, cause miscarriage, injury and death from relatively small exposures.

As of August 21st, 2025, the highly hazardous chemicals list includes:

Chemical	CAS number	Threshold quantity (lbs)
Acetaldehyde	75-07-0	2500
Acrolein	107-02-8	150
Acryloyl chloride	814-68-6	250
Allyl chloride	107-05-1	1000
Allylamine	107-11-9	1000
Alkylaluminum	Varies	5000
Ammonia, anhydrous	7664-41-7	10000
Ammonia solutions (greater than 44% ammonia by weight)	7664-41-7	15000
Ammonium perchlorate	7790-98-9	7500
Ammonium permanganate	7787-36-2	7500
Arsine	7784-42-1	100
Bis(chloromethyl) ether	542-88-1	100
Boron trichloride	10294-34-5	2500
Boron trifluoride	7637-07-2	250
Bromine	7726-95-6	1500
Bromine chloride	13863-41-7	1500
Bromine pentafluoride	7789-30-2	2500
Bromine trifluoride	7787-71-5	15000
3-Bromopropyne	106-96-7	100
tert-Butyl hydroperoxide	75-91-2	5000
tert-Butyl perbenzoate	614-45-9	7500
Carbonyl chloride	75-44-5	100
Carbonyl fluoride	353-50-4	2500
Cellulose nitrate (concentration greater than 12.6% nitrogen)	9004-70-0	2500
Chlorine	7782-50-5	1500
Chlorine dioxide	10049-04-4	1000
Chlorine pentafluoride	13637-63-3	1000
Chlorine trifluoride	7790-91-2	1000
Chlorodiethylaluminum	96-10-6	5000
1-Chloro-2,4-dinitrobenzene	97-00-7	5000
Chloromethyl methyl ether	107-30-2	500
Chloropicrin	76-06-2	500
Chloropicrin and methyl bromide mixture	None	1500
Chloropicrin and methyl chloride mixture	None	1500
Cumene hydroperoxide	80-15-9	5000
Cyanogen	460-19-5	2500
Cyanogen chloride	506-77-4	500
Cyanuric fluoride	675-14-9	100
Diacetyl peroxide (concentration greater than 70%)	110-22-5	5000
Diazomethane	334-88-3	500
Dibenzoyl peroxide	94-36-0	7500
Diborane	19287-45-7	100
tert-Dibutyl peroxide	110-05-4	5000
Dichloroacetylene	7572-29-4	250
Dichlorosilane	4109-96-0	2500
Diethylzinc	557-20-0	10000
Disopropyl peroxydicarbonate	105-64-6	7500
Dilauroyl peroxide	105-74-8	7500
Dimethyldichlorosilane	75-78-5	1000
1,1-Dimethylhydrazine	57-14-7	1000
Dimethylamine, anhydrous	124-40-3	2500
2,4-Dinitroaniline	97-02-9	5000
Ethyl Methyl Ketone Peroxide (also Methyl Ethyl Ketone Peroxide; concentration >60%)	1338-23-4	5000
Ethyl nitrite	109-95-5	5000
Ethylamine	75-04-7	7500
Ethylene fluorohydrin	371-62-0	100
Ethylene Oxide	75-21-8	5000
Ethyleneimine	151-56-4	1000
Fluorine	7782-41-4	1000
Formaldehyde (formalin)	50-00-0	1000
Furan	110-00-9	500
Hexafluoroacetone	684-16-2	5000
Hydrochloric acid, anhydrous	7647-01-0	5000
Hydrofluoric acid, anhydrous	7664-39-3	1000
Hydrogen bromide	10035-10-6	5000
Hydrogen chloride	7647-01-0	5000
Hydrogen cyanide, anhydrous	74-90-8	1000
Hydrogen fluoride	7664-39-3	1000
Hydrogen peroxide (52% by weight or greater)	7722-84-1	7500
Hydrogen selenide	7783-07-5	150
Hydrogen sulfide	7783-06-4	1500
Hydroxylamine	7803-49-8	2500
Iron pentacarbonyl	13463-40-6	250
Isopropylamine	75-31-0	5000
Ketene	463-51-4	100
Methacrylaldehyde	78-85-3	1000
Methacryloyl chloride	920-46-7	150
Methacryloyloxyethyl isocyanate	30674-80-7	100
Methyl acrylonitrile	126-98-7	250
Methylamine, anhydrous	74-89-5	1000
Methyl bromide	74-83-9	2500
Methyl chloride	74-87-3	15000
Methyl chloroformate	79-22-1	500
Methyl ethyl ketone peroxide	1338-23-4	5000
Methyl fluoroacetate	453-18-9	100
Methyl fluorosulfate	421-20-5	100
Methyl hydrazine	60-34-4	100
Methyl iodide	74-88-4	7500
Methyl isocyanate	624-83-9	250
Methyl mercaptan	74-93-1	5000
Methyl vinyl ketone	79-84-4	100
Methyltrichlorosilane	75-79-6	500
Nickel carbonyl	13463-39-3	150
Nitric acid (94.5% by weight or greater)	7697-37-2	500
Nitric oxide	10102-43-9	250
para-Nitroaniline	100-01-6	5000
Nitromethane	75-52-5	2500
Nitrogen dioxide	10102-44-0	250
Nitrogen oxides (NO; NO_{2}; N_{2}O_{4}; N_{2}O_{3})	10102-44-0	250
Nitrogen tetroxide	10544-72-6	250
Nitrogen trifluoride	7783-54-2	5000
Nitrogen trioxide	10544-73-7	250
Oleum (65% to 80% by weight)	8014-95-7	1000
Osmium tetroxide	20816-12-0	100
Oxygen difluoride	7783-41-7	100
Ozone	10028-15-6	100
Pentaborane	19624-22-7	100
Peracetic acid (concentration greater than 60%)	79-21-0	1000
Perchloric acid (concentration greater than 60% by weight)	7601-90-3	5000
Perchloromethyl mercaptan	594-42-3	150
Perchloryl fluoride	7616-94-6	5000
Phosgene	75-44-5	100
Phosphine	7803-51-2	100
Phosphorus oxychloride	10025-87-3	1000
Phosphorus trichloride	7719-12-2	1000
Phosphoryl chloride	10025-87-3	1000
Propargyl bromide	106-96-7	100
Propyl nitrate	627-3-4	2500
Sarin	107-44-8	100
Selenium hexafluoride	7783-79-1	1000
Stibine	7803-52-3	500
Sulfur dioxide (liquid)	7446-09-5	1000
Sulfur pentafluoride	5714-22-7	250
Sulfur tetrafluoride	7783-60-0	250
Sulfur trioxide	7446-11-9	1000
Sulfuric anhydride	7446-11-9	1000
Tellurium hexafluoride	7783-80-4	250
Tetrafluoroethylene	116-14-3	5000
Tetrafluorohydrazine	10036-47-2	5000
Tetramethyl lead	75-74-1	1000
Thionyl chloride	7719-09-7	250
Trichloro(chloromethyl)silane	1558-25-4	100
Trichloro(dichlorophenyl)silane	27137-85-5	2500
Trichlorosilane	10025-78-2	5000
Trifluorochloroethylene	79-38-9	10000
Trimethoxysilane	2487-90-3	1500
