= 4-Fluorobutanol =

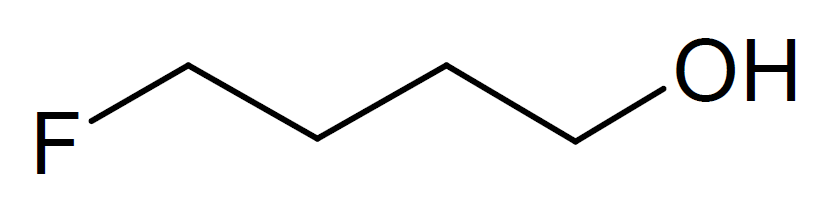

Names
- Preferred IUPAC name 4-Fluorobutan-1-ol

Identifiers
CAS Number	372-93-0
3D model (JSmol)	Interactive image
ChemSpider	9372
PubChem CID	9755
CompTox Dashboard (EPA)	DTXSID60190698
- InChI: InChI=1S/C4H9FO/c5-3-1-2-4-6/h6H,1-4H2 Key: SHOBGSRUFRALBO-UHFFFAOYSA-N
- SMILES: C(CCF)CO

Properties
Chemical formula	C_{4}H_{9}FO
Molar mass	92.113 g·mol^{−1}
Boiling point	129.3 °C (264.7 °F; 402.4 K)
Solubility in water	miscible

Hazards
- GHS labelling
Pictograms	(GHS02: Flammable) (GHS07: Exclamation mark)
Signal word	Warning
Hazard statements	H226, H315, H319, H335
Precautionary statements	P210, P233, P240, P241, P242, P243, P261, P264, P271, P280, P302+P352, P303+P361+P353, P304+P340, P305+P351+P338, P312, P321, P332+P313, P337+P313, P362, P370+P378, P403+P233, P403+P235, P405, P501
- Lethal dose or concentration (LD, LC)
LD_{50} (median dose)	0.9 mg·kg^{−1}(mouse, injected IP or SC)

Related compounds
Related compounds	1,4-dichlorobutane 1,4-butanediol
- Except where otherwise noted, data are given for materials in their standard state (at 25 °C [77 °F], 100 kPa). Infobox references

4-Fluorobutanol is a chemical compound, a flammable colorless liquid which is a fluorinated alcohol. Like 2-fluoroethanol, it is highly toxic due to its ready metabolism to fluoroacetate.

== See also ==
- 1,3-Difluoro-2-propanol
- 2-Fluoroethanol
- Methyl fluoroacetate
- Fluoroethyl fluoroacetate
