= C7H9NO3 =

The molecular formula C_{7}H_{9}NO_{3} may refer to:

- Ammonium salicylate
- Methacryloyloxyethyl isocyanate
