= 2-Ethylhexyl fluoroacetate =

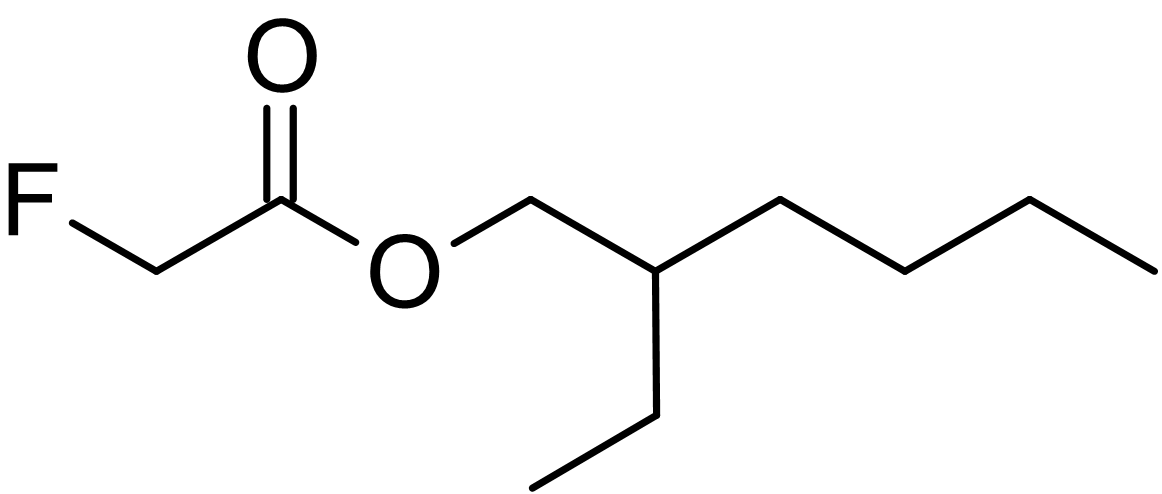

Names
- Preferred IUPAC name 2-Ethylhexyl fluoroacetate

Identifiers
CAS Number	331-87-3
3D model (JSmol)	Interactive image
ChemSpider	9139
PubChem CID	9511
CompTox Dashboard (EPA)	DTXSID80954734
- InChI: InChI=1S/C10H19FO2/c1-3-5-6-9(4-2)8-13-10(12)7-11/h9H,3-8H2,1-2H3 Key: FDEKGWKFHSSZFD-UHFFFAOYSA-N
- SMILES: CCCCC(CC)COC(=O)CF

Properties
Chemical formula	FCH_{2}CO_{2}CH_{2}CH(CH_{2}CH_{3})CH_{2}CH_{2}CH_{2}CH_{3}
Molar mass	190.258 g·mol^{−1}

Hazards
- Lethal dose or concentration (LD, LC)
LD_{Lo} (lowest published)	10 mg/kg (rabbits, percutaneous); 10 mg/kg (rabbits, intravenous)
- Except where otherwise noted, data are given for materials in their standard state (at 25 °C [77 °F], 100 kPa). Infobox references

2-Ethylhexyl fluoroacetate is an organic compound with the chemical formula FCH_{2}CO_{2}CH_{2}CH(CH_{2}CH_{3})CH_{2}CH_{2}CH_{2}CH_{3}. It is the fluoroacetate (FCH_{2}CO_{2}−) ester of 2-ethylhexanol, in other words, the 2-ethylhexyl (−CH_{2}CH(CH_{2}CH_{3})CH_{2}CH_{2}CH_{2}CH_{3}) ester of fluoroacetic acid. It can be produced by reaction of ethyl fluoroacetate with 2-ethylhexanol. 2-Ethylhexyl fluoroacetate is a liquid that is highly toxic by skin absorption.

== See also ==
- Methyl fluoroacetate
- Fluoroethyl fluoroacetate
- Fluoroaspirin
