= 2-Fluoroethanol =

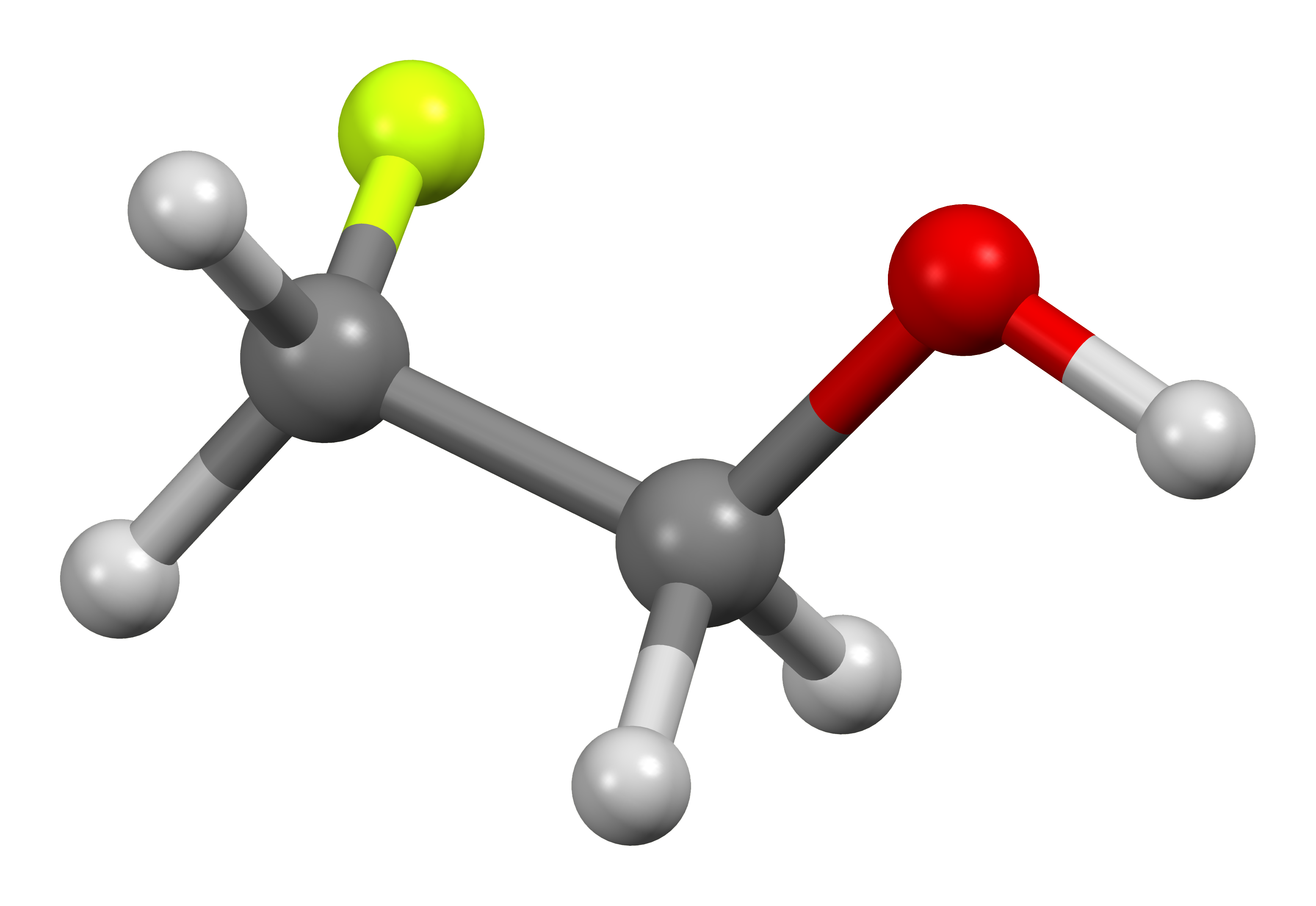

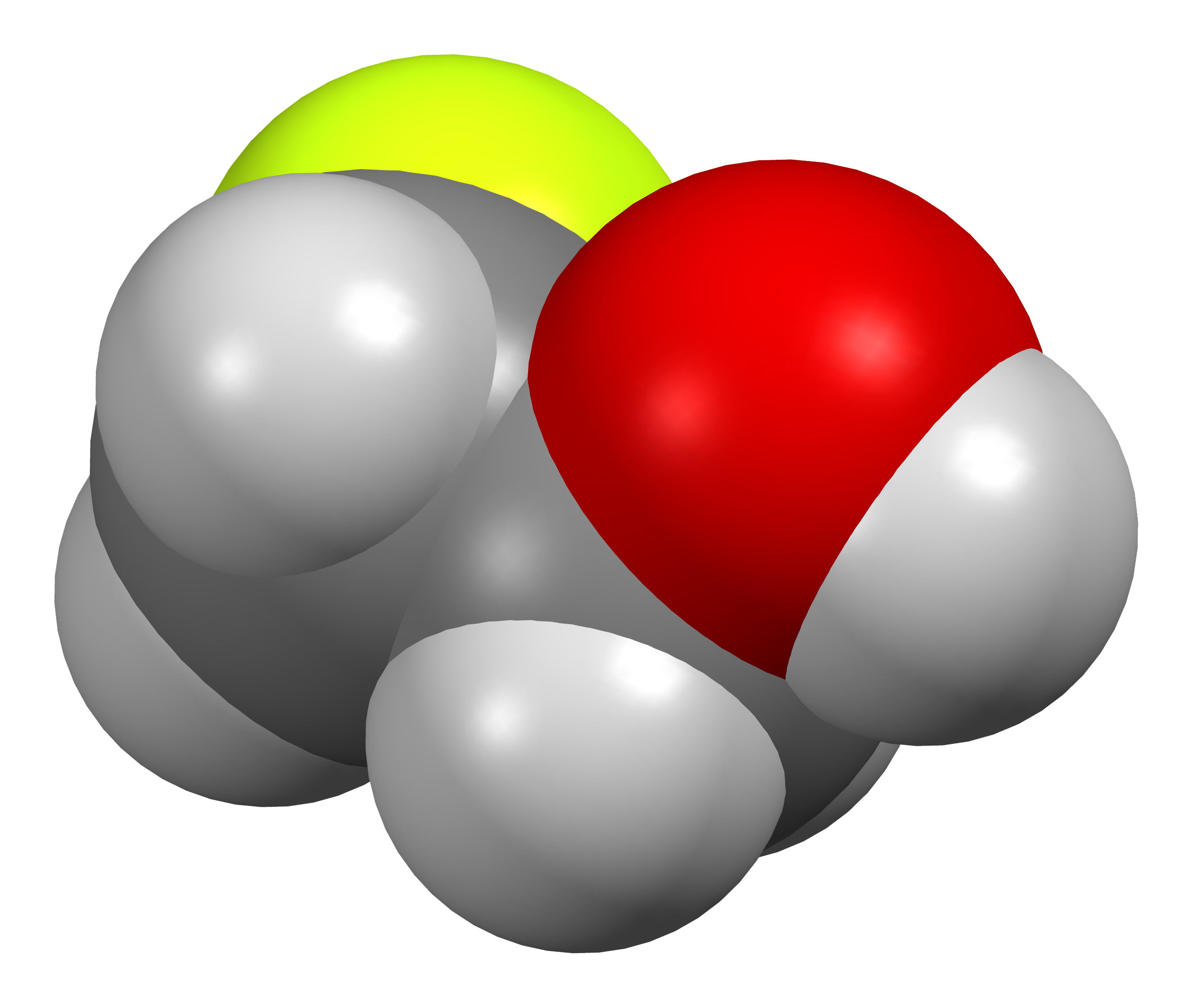

Names
- Preferred IUPAC name 2-Fluoroethan-1-ol
- Other names Ethylene fluorohydrine

Identifiers
CAS Number	371-62-0
3D model (JSmol)	Interactive image
ChEMBL	ChEMBL115586
ChemSpider	9354
ECHA InfoCard	100.006.128
PubChem CID	9737
UNII	4M427A5HML
CompTox Dashboard (EPA)	DTXSID0059902
- InChI: InChI=1S/C2H5FO/c3-1-2-4/h4H,1-2H2 Key: GGDYAKVUZMZKRV-UHFFFAOYSA-N; InChI=1/C2H5FO/c3-1-2-4/h4H,1-2H2 Key: GGDYAKVUZMZKRV-UHFFFAOYAT
- SMILES: FCCO

Properties
Chemical formula	C_{2}H_{5}FO
Molar mass	64.059 g·mol^{−1}
Odor	Musky, rather tart
Density	1.1040 g cm^{−3}
Melting point	−26.3 °C (−15.3 °F; 246.8 K)
Boiling point	103.5 °C (218.3 °F; 376.6 K)
Solubility in water	miscible
Solubility	Soluble in ethanol, ethyl ether, acetone
Vapor pressure	19 mbar (15 °C)
Acidity (pK_{a})	14.74 (predicted)

Hazards
- GHS labelling
Pictograms	(GHS06: Toxic) (GHS02: Flammable)
Hazard statements	H226, H300+H310+H330
Precautionary statements	P210, P233, P240, P241, P242, P243, P260, P262, P264, P270, P271, P280, P284, P301+P310+P330, P303+P361+P353, P304+P340+P310, P363, P370+P378, P403+P233, P403+P235, P405, P501
NFPA 704 (fire diamond)	4 2 1
Flash point	34 °C (93.2 °F; 307.15 K)

Related compounds
Other anions	2-Chloroethanol
- Except where otherwise noted, data are given for materials in their standard state (at 25 °C [77 °F], 100 kPa). verify (what is ?) Infobox references

2-Fluoroethanol is the organic compound with the formula CH_{2}FCH_{2}OH. This colorless liquid is one of the simplest stable fluorinated alcohols. It was once used as a pesticide. The related difluoro- and trifluoroethanols are far less dangerous.

== Synthesis ==
2-Fluoroethanol was originally synthesized by treating 2-chloroethanol with potassium fluoride, in a simple Finkelstein reaction. The product has a lower boiling point that the starting material and may be conveniently isolated by distillation.

ClCH_{2}CH_{2}OH + KF → FCH_{2}CH_{2}OH + KCl

Similar procedures start from (1,3)-dioxolan-2-one and from 2-bromoethanol.

== Structure and reactivity ==
Hydrogen bonding stabilizes the gauche conformer.

In a basic solution, 2-fluoroethanol undergoes dehydrofluorination, giving acetaldehyde.

Reaction of 2-fluoroethanol with trifluoromethanesulfonic anhydride in the presence of base gives the triflate ester.

== PET radiotracers ==
2-[^{18}F]-fluoroethoxy group is a common moiety in the structures of radiotracers used with PET. Such radiotracers include fluoroethyl-l-tyrosine 1-(2-[^{18}F]-fluoroethoxy)-4-nitrobenzene and [^{18}F]-fluoroethyl 4-fluorobenzoate, being a [18F]fluoroalkyl ether and ester respectively.

== Metabolism ==
It was patented as a rodenticide in Germany in 1935. In rats, it was found that fluoroethanol induced a similar toxicity as that of fluoroacetate, known to metabolize to fluorocitrate to exert the toxic effect.

2-Fluoroethanol is converted by alcohol dehydrogenase (ADH) using nicotinamide adenine dinucleotide (NAD+) as cofactor, ultimately leading to the formation of fluoroacetaldehyde and then fluoroacetate.

Fluoroacetate is a precursor to fluorocitrate, an inhibitor of aconitase, an enzyme that participates in the TCA cycle.

== Toxicity ==
Reported effects of 2-fluoroethanol are epigastric distress effects, such as vomiting, and central nervous effects, such as auditory hallucinations, numbness feeling of the face or nose. Both these types of effects occur gradually after being exposed to 2-fluoroethanol for several hours. Some more severe reactions of the human body to 2-fluoroethanol can be respiratory failure and epileptiform convulsions or seizures, leading to dysfunctions in the heart mechanism. From the early 20th century, there are multiple reports of deaths caused by 2-fluoroethanol.

2-Fluoroethanol is also toxic to other animals with LD50 ranging from 7 to 1500 mg/kg bodyweight.

== See also ==
- Sodium fluoroacetate
- 1,3-Difluoro-2-propanol
- 4-Fluorobutanol
