= Fluoroaspirin =

Names
- Preferred IUPAC name 2-[(Fluoroacetyl)oxy]benzoic acid
- Other names Fluoroacetylsalicylic acid, O-(Fluoroacetyl)salicylic acid

Identifiers
CAS Number	364-71-6
3D model (JSmol)	Interactive image
ChemSpider	61085
PubChem CID	67766
UNII	55RH7BA96P
CompTox Dashboard (EPA)	DTXSID30957750
- InChI: InChI=1S/C9H7FO4/c10-5-8(11)14-7-4-2-1-3-6(7)9(12)13/h1-4H,5H2,(H,12,13) Key: ISJRKJAXVBVDDK-UHFFFAOYSA-N
- SMILES: c1ccc(c(c1)C(=O)O)OC(=O)CF

Properties
Chemical formula	C_{9}H_{7}FO_{4}
Molar mass	198.149 g·mol^{−1}

Hazards
- Lethal dose or concentration (LD, LC)
LD_{50} (median dose)	15 mg/kg (mice, subcutaneous)
- Except where otherwise noted, data are given for materials in their standard state (at 25 °C [77 °F], 100 kPa). Infobox references

Fluoroaspirin is the fluoroacetate ester of salicylic acid. It is the fluoroacetate analog of aspirin. Like other fluoroacetate esters, fluoroaspirin is highly toxic.

== See also ==
- Methyl fluoroacetate
- Fluoroethyl fluoroacetate
