= Methyl fluoroacetate =

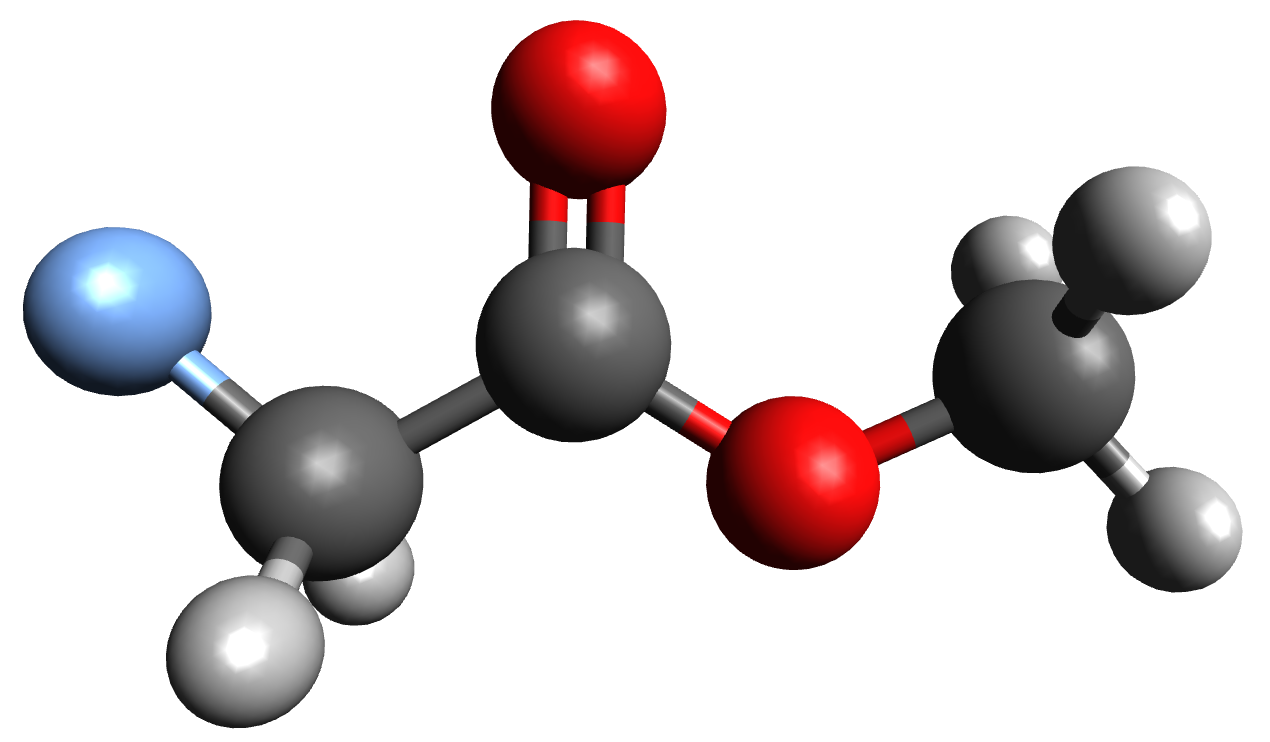
- Carbon, C Hydrogen, H Oxygen, O Fluorine, F

Names
- Preferred IUPAC name Methyl fluoroacetate
- Other names: AF-1; MFA; T-1202; TL-551

Identifiers
CAS Number	453-18-9
3D model (JSmol)	Interactive image
ChemSpider	9565
ECHA InfoCard	100.006.563
EC Number	207-218-7
PubChem CID	9959
UNII	MO8U9H1FAS
CompTox Dashboard (EPA)	DTXSID3073185
- InChI: InChI=1S/C3H5FO2/c1-6-3(5)2-4/h2H2,1H3 Key: RJBYSQHLLIHSLT-UHFFFAOYSA-N
- SMILES: COC(=O)CF

Properties
Chemical formula	FCH_{2}CO_{2}CH_{3}
Molar mass	92.069 g·mol^{−1}
Appearance	Colorless liquid
Odor	Odorless or faint fruity
Melting point	−40 °C (−40 °F; 233 K)
Boiling point	104 °C (219 °F; 377 K)
Solubility in water	117 g/L at 25 °C

Hazards
- Occupational safety and health (OHS/OSH)
Main hazards	Extremely toxic
- GHS labelling
Pictograms	(GHS02: Flammable) (GHS06: Toxic) (GHS07: Exclamation mark) (GHS09: Environmental hazard)
Signal word	Danger
Hazard statements	H226, H300, H315, H319, H335, H400
Precautionary statements	P210, P233, P240, P241, P242, P243, P261, P264, P270, P271, P273, P280, P301+P310, P302+P352, P303+P361+P353, P304+P340, P305+P351+P338, P312, P321, P330, P332+P313, P337+P313, P362, P370+P378, P391, P403+P233, P403+P235, P405, P501
Flash point	−32 °C (−26 °F; 241 K)
- Lethal dose or concentration (LD, LC)
LD_{50} (median dose)	6 mg/kg (mice)

Related compounds
Related compounds	Fluoroacetic acid; Sodium fluoroacetate; 2-Ethylhexyl fluoroacetate; Fluoroethyl fluoroacetate; Fluoroacetamide
- Except where otherwise noted, data are given for materials in their standard state (at 25 °C [77 °F], 100 kPa). Infobox references

Methyl fluoroacetate (MFA) is an organic compound with the chemical formula FCH_{2}CO_{2}CH_{3}. It is the extremely toxic methyl ester of fluoroacetic acid. It is a colorless, odorless liquid at room temperature. It is used as a laboratory chemical and as a rodenticide. Because of its extreme toxicity, MFA was studied for potential use as a chemical weapon.

The general population is not likely to be exposed to methyl fluoroacetate. People who use MFA for work, however, can breathe in or have direct skin contact with the substance.

== History ==
MFA was first synthesized in 1896 by the Belgian chemist Frédéric Swarts by reacting methyl iodoacetate with silver fluoride. It can also be synthesized by reacting methyl chloroacetate with potassium fluoride

Because of its toxicity, MFA was studied for potential use as a chemical weapon during World War II. It was considered a good water poison since it is colorless and odorless and therefore it can toxify the water supply and kill a big part of the population. By the end of the war, several countries began to make methyl fluoroacetate to debilitate or kill the enemy.

== Synthesis ==
The synthesis of methyl fluoroacetate consists of a two-step process:

1. Potassium fluoride (KF) and the catalyst are added into the solvent within the reactor; this is then stirred and heated up. The catalyst mentioned in this step is a phase-transfer catalyst and can be the chemicals dodecyl(trimethyl)ammonium chloride [(CH_{3}(CH_{2})_{11})(CH_{3})_{3}N]^{+}Cl^{−}, tetrabutylammonium chloride [(CH_{3}(CH_{2})_{3})_{4}N]^{+}Cl^{−}, tetrabutylammonium bromide [(CH_{3}(CH_{2})_{3})_{4}N]^{+}Br^{−}, or tetramethylammonium chloride [(CH_{3})_{4}N]^{+}Cl^{−}. The mass ratio of the potassium fluoride and the catalyst in this step is 0.5~1 : 0.02~0.03. With the solvent mentioned in this step being a mixture of dimethylformamide (HCON(CH_{3})_{2}) and acetamide (CH_{3}CONH_{2}) with a mass ratio of 1.4~1.6: 1. The mass ratio of the solvent and potassium fluoride is 1.1~2.0 : 0.5~1.
2. When the reaction temperature of 100~160 °C is reached, methyl chloroacetate ClCH_{2}CO_{2}CH_{3} is continuously added in the reactor at a speed of 5~10 kg/min with the mass ratio of methyl chloroacetate and potassium fluoride being 1:0.5～1. The reaction between these chemicals produces a gas mixture, with the gases within this mixture then being split between two condensers according to their condensation temperature. Methyl chloroacetate is condensed within the condenser set at 100~105 °C, it is then returned to the reactor to continue participating in the chemical reaction. Methyl fluoroacetate in the other condenser then enters a two-stage nitration condensation at a temperature of 20~25 °C which then ensures that the methyl fluoroacetate is condensed into a liquid with it being the product of this reaction.

== Structure and reactivity ==
Methyl fluoroacetate is a methyl ester of fluoroacetic acid.

MFA is a liquid, which is odorless or can have a faint, fruity smell. The boiling point of MFA is 104.5 °C and the melting point is −35.0 °C. It is soluble in water (117 g/L at 25 °C) and slightly soluble in petroleum ether.

MFA is resistant to the displacement of fluorine by nucleophiles, so there is higher stability of the C−F bond compared to the other halogens (C−Cl, C−Br, C−I). The other haloacetates are more powerful alkylating agents that react with −SH group of proteins. This, however, does not happen for MFA and gives it a unique toxic action. Moreover, MFA is a derivative of fluoroacetate (FA) compound which is as toxic and has similar biotransformation to MFA.

== Mechanism of action and metabolism ==
Generally, fluoroacetates are toxic because they are converted to fluorocitrate by fluoroacetyl coenzyme A. Fluorocitrate can inhibit aconitate hydratase, which is needed for the conversion of citrate, by competitive inhibition. This interrupts the citric acid cycle (TCA cycle) and also causes citrate to accumulate in the tissues and eventually in the plasma. MFA is mainly biotransformed by glutathione transferase enzyme in a phase 2 biotransformation process. The GSH-dependent enzyme couples glutathione to MFA and thereby defluorinating MFA. As a result, a fluoride anion and S-carboxymethylglutathione are produced. The decoupling of fluoride is mediated by a fluoroacetate-specific defluorinase. The defluorinating activity is mainly present in the liver, but also kidneys, lungs, the heart, and the testicles show activity. In the brain, there are no signs of defluorination. Eventually, fluorocitrate (FC) is formed which is the main toxic compound. It binds the aconitase enzyme with a very high affinity and therefore intervenes in the TCA cycle. Citrate in normal circumstances is converted to succinate, but the process is inhibited. The cycle stops and oxidative phosphorylation is prevented since NADH, FADH2 and succinate are required from the TCA cycle. Respiration stops shortly. The poison acts very quickly and has no antidote.

Mammals are intolerant to MFA. However, a few Australian species (e.g. brush-tailed possum) show a level of tolerance to fluoroacetate by metabolizing it using glutathione-S-transferase. Fluoride can be removed from fluoroacetate or fluorocitrate. It is involved in detoxifying the aryl and alkyl groups by converting them into glutathione conjugates. The C−F bond is cleaved because of a nucleophilic attack of carbon resulting in the formation of S-carboxymethyl glutathione. This can be afterward excreted in the form of S-carboxymethylcysteine.

The elimination half-life of biotransformed MFA is about 2 days. When administered, the MFA mainly resides in blood plasma, but can also be traced in the liver, kidney, and muscle tissue.

== Toxicity ==
MFA is a convulsant poison. It causes severe convulsions in poisoned victims. Death results from respiratory failure.

For a variety of animals, the toxicity of methyl fluoroacetate has been determined orally and through subcutaneous injection. The dosage ranges from 0.1 mg/kg in dogs to 10–12 mg/kg in monkeys indicating considerable variation. An order of decreasing susceptibility has been determined within these animals which is: dog, guinea-pig, cat, rabbit, goat, and then likely horse, rat, mouse, and monkey. For the rat and mouse, the toxicity by inhalation has been investigated more fully than for other animals. The LD_{50} for the rat and mouse are 450 mg/m^{3} and above 1,000 mg/m^{3} for 5 minutes, respectively. In dogs, guinea-pigs, cats, rabbits, goats, horses, rats, mice, and monkeys, the pharmacological effects of this substance have been investigated by mouth and by injection. Methyl fluoroacetate causes progressive depression of respiration and is a convulsant poison in most animals. When applied to the skin it is not toxic, yet through inhalation, injection and by mouth it is. For the rat, cat and the rhesus monkey, the effects of methyl fluoroacetate have been determined similar to those of nicotine, strychnine, leptazol, picrotoxin, and electrically induced convulsions. The convulsive pattern is considered to be similar to that of leptazol. Little besides signs of asphyxia is found post-mortem in these animals. Estimations have been made for blood sugar, hemoglobin, plasma proteins, non-protein nitrogen, and serum potassium, calcium, chloride, and inorganic phosphate in a small number of rabbits, dogs, and goats. Blood changes include a rise of 20 to 60% in hemoglobin, a rise of up to 90% in blood sugar, a rise of 70 to 130% in inorganic phosphate, and a less significant rise in serum potassium with a terminal rise in non-protein nitrogen and potassium. The whole central nervous system is affected by methyl fluoroacetate just like with leptazol, with the higher centers being more sensitive than the lower ones. Small doses of methyl fluoroacetate have little effect on blood pressure yet in large doses it has an action similar to nicotine. It further stimulates the rate and volume of respiration and then causes failure of the respiration, probably central in origin as seen through graphic records. The knee jerk reaction appears to be accentuated through methyl fluoroacetate until convulsions occur due to the irradiation of the stimuli being so facilitated. Nervous conduction is increased and the threshold stimulus lessened in the reflex arc of a spinal cat. Methyl fluoroacetate reduces the electric convulsive threshold about 10 times in rats. The difficulties of treatments are stressed as methyl fluoroacetate is both a powerful convulsant and a respiratory depressant, yet suggestions for treatment in man are made. Methyl fluoroacetate presents a serious hazard as a food and water contaminant in the case that it is used as a poison against rodents and other vermin, as it is not easily detected or destroyed and is equally toxic by mouth and by injection.

== Environmental exposure ==
Methyl fluoroacetate is produced and used as a chemical reagent and it can be released to the environment through several waste streams. When it was used as a rodenticide, it was released directly to the environment where it would be broken down in the air. If released to air, an estimated vapor pressure of 31 mmHg at 25 °C indicates methyl fluoroacetate will exist solely as a vapor in the atmosphere. Vapor-phase methyl fluoroacetate will be degraded in the atmosphere by reaction with photochemically produced hydroxyl radicals. The half-life for this reaction in air is estimated to be 98 days.

MFA does not contain chromophores that absorb at wavelengths > 290 nm and therefore it's not expected to be susceptible to direct photolysis by sunlight.

== Effects on animals ==
The effects on animals occur very rapidly and strongly, all resulting in death. Exposure to a high concentration of MFA vapor does not show any symptoms in animals until 30–60 minutes. Then violent reactions and death took place in a few hours, according to studies. From intravenous injection mice, rats, and guinea pigs show symptoms after 15 min to 2 hours. The animals become quiet and limp. Rabbits show a similar latent time period and muscle weakness. Dogs show symptoms of hyperactivity. They are more sensitive because of higher rates of metabolism and, eventually, they also fail to respirate. Fish are more resistant because of slow metabolism and therefore it is not expected that the substance will build up in fish. Also, Australian herbivores (e.g. possum and seed-eating birds) that live in a habitat consisting of plants with traces of fluoroacetate, have some tolerance. This can happen by detoxifying fluoroacetate or more resistivity of aconitase to fluorocitrate in the presence of GSH. Some insects can store the toxin in vacuoles and use it later. The highly hazardous MFA cannot be used for poisoning animals without risking human life.

== Antidotal therapy ==
There is no known antidote against MFA, but there are some suggestions regarding the treatment of MFA poisoning. Advised is to use an intravenous injection of fast-acting anesthetics directly after poisoning. The anesthetic should be pentothal sodium or evipan sodium followed by an intramuscular injection of long-acting cortical depressants like sodium phenobarbitone or rectal avertin. Afterward, careful supervision of oxygen supply is necessary together with a BLB mask and the use of artificial respiration. Possibly, the use of hypertonic glucose intravenously is required as in status epilepticus. At last, careful use of tubocurarine chloride should be applied to control any convulsions. If any vomiting occurs, lean the patient forward to maintain an open airway.

Alternatively, there is a therapy aimed at the prevention of fluorocitrate synthesis, the blocking of aconitase within the mitochondria, and to provide a citrate outflow from the mitochondria to keep the TCA cycle going. For now, ethanol has proven to be the most effective against FC formation. When ethanol is oxidized, it increases blood acetate levels which inhibits FC production. In humans, an oral dose of 40-60 mL 96% ethanol is advised followed by 1.0-1.5 g/kg of 5-10% ethanol intravenously during the first hour and 0.1 g/kg during the following 6–8 hours. This therapy is meant for fluoroacetate (FA) poisoning which is highly related MFA, so this therapy aimed at MFA may result in other outcomes.

Treatment with monoacetin (glycerol monoacetate) helped against FA poisoning. It aids in increasing acetate levels of the blood and it decreases citrate levels in the heart, brain, and kidneys. However, this is only tested experimentally. In monkeys, monoacetin even reverses the effects of FA: all biological effects normalized. As with ethanol, monoacetin is effective against FA poisoning.

There is up until now, no proven treatment against MFA. However, the beforementioned treatments can provide starting points for therapy aimed at MFA since FA and MFA are closely related compounds.

== See also ==
- Chemical weapon
- Highly hazardous chemical
- EPA list of extremely hazardous substances
