= 1,4-Dichlorobutane =

Names
- Preferred IUPAC name 1,2-Dichlorobutane

Identifiers
CAS Number	110-56-5
3D model (JSmol)	Interactive image
ChemSpider	21106032
ECHA InfoCard	100.003.436
EC Number	203-778-1
PubChem CID	8059
UNII	8326YNM2B3
UN number	1993
CompTox Dashboard (EPA)	DTXSID5021918
- InChI: InChI=1S/C4H8Cl2/c5-3-1-2-4-6/h1-4H2 Key: KJDRSWPQXHESDQ-UHFFFAOYSA-N
- SMILES: C(CCCl)CCl

Properties
Chemical formula	C_{4}H_{8}Cl_{2}
Molar mass	127.01 g·mol^{−1}
Density	1.16 g.mL^{−1}
Boiling point	161–163 °C (322–325 °F; 434–436 K)

Hazards
- GHS labelling
Pictograms	(GHS02: Flammable) (GHS07: Exclamation mark)
Signal word	Warning
Hazard statements	H226, H315, H319, H335, H412
Precautionary statements	P210, P233, P240, P241, P242, P243, P261, P264, P264+P265, P271, P273, P280, P302+P352, P303+P361+P353, P304+P340, P305+P351+P338, P319, P321, P332+P317, P337+P317, P362+P364, P370+P378, P403+P233, P403+P235, P405, P501

Related compounds
Related compounds	1,2-Dichlorobut-2-ene; 4-Fluorobutanol; 1,2-Butanediol
- Except where otherwise noted, data are given for materials in their standard state (at 25 °C [77 °F], 100 kPa). Infobox references

1,4-Dichlorobutane is a chloroalkane with the molecular formula (CH_{2}CH_{2}Cl)_{2}. It is one of several structural isomers of dichlorobutane. They are all colorless liquids of low flammabiltity and of interest for specialized synthetic uses.

== Preparation and reactions ==
1,4-Dichlorobutane can be obtained from 1,4-butanediol as well as from tetrahydrofuran.

1,4-Dihalobutanes are well suited for the synthesis of 5-membered ring heterocycles. For example, treatment with sodium sulfide gives tetrahydrothiophene. Treatment with lithium wire gives 1,4-dilithiobutane.

1,4-Dichlorobutane can be used, among others, as a precursor for nylon 6,6 (via adiponitrile).
