= 4'-Aminopropiophenone =

Names
- Preferred IUPAC name 1-(4-Aminophenyl)propan-1-one
- Other names 1-(4-Aminophenyl)-1-propanone para-Aminopropiophenone; PAPP

Identifiers
CAS Number	70-69-9
3D model (JSmol)	Interactive image
ChemSpider	6034
ECHA InfoCard	100.000.675
PubChem CID	6270
UNII	79GF917W6U
CompTox Dashboard (EPA)	DTXSID7021738
- InChI: InChI=1S/C9H11NO/c1-2-9(11)7-3-5-8(10)6-4-7/h3-6H,2,10H2,1H3 Key: FSWXOANXOQPCFF-UHFFFAOYSA-N; InChI=1/C9H11NO/c1-2-9(11)7-3-5-8(10)6-4-7/h3-6H,2,10H2,1H3 Key: FSWXOANXOQPCFF-UHFFFAOYAU
- SMILES: O=C(c1ccc(N)cc1)CC

Properties
Chemical formula	C_{9}H_{11}NO
Molar mass	149.193 g·mol^{−1}
Appearance	colorless plates (from alcohol + water) or needles (from water)
Melting point	140
Solubility in dimethyl sulfoxide	soluble
- Except where otherwise noted, data are given for materials in their standard state (at 25 °C [77 °F], 100 kPa). Infobox references

4'-Aminopropiophenone (para-aminopropiophenone or PAPP) is a chemical compound. It is highly toxic, and can cause injury or death upon physical contact or inhalation of fumes.

The toxicity of PAPP is derived from its action on circulating hemoglobin, rapidly converting it to methemoglobin (similar to nitrite poisoning). As methemoglobin is not capable of transporting oxygen like hemoglobin, elevated blood levels (methemoglobinemia) lead to hypoxia, coma, and death due to the inhibition of cellular respiration.

== As a pesticide ==
PAPP was first assessed for its potential as a predator control agent in the United States in the early 1980s yet was not developed into a practical technology. From the 1990s scientists based at the then Victorian Institute of Animal Science (Australia) were the first to demonstrate that PAPP could be formulated as a rapid acting and humane means of feral cat and exotic red fox control.

Improved animal welfare outcomes and the existence of an antidote (methylene blue) to treat accidental poisoning was an attractive feature of the agent given that the humaneness of the most commonly used poison (sodium fluoroacetate or '1080') is equivocal and no antidote exists for treating accidental 1080 poisoning. Due to the short duration after consumption before death it is critical the antidote be administered as soon as possible. The only antidote that has been shown to work reliably to date is by intravenous (IV) administration.

Researchers also discovered that the delivery of PAPP in feral cat baits within a specialised capsule, which exploits the unique dentition and feeding strategies of feral cats, could greatly limit the exposure of non-target animals to PAPP even if they consume a bait. This became a significant feature adopted in the development of a feral cat bait that became known as Curiosity.

Initially collaborating with scientists in Victoria, New Zealand researchers independently developed PAPP formulations and baiting techniques for introduced predators. Initial indications that PAPP was far more toxic to mammals than birds was an attractive feature of its use in New Zealand where it was formulated to control stoats, weasels, and feral cats and registered for use in New Zealand in 2011. PAPP is being further investigated in Australia for use on feral cats, red foxes and wild dogs.

In New Zealand PAPP kills stoats at low bait concentrations that are not lethal to far more tolerant exotic possums and rats. In New Zealand it is approved for use in paste form or in fresh minced meat, so will only provide effective stoat control as part of intensive ground control. The potential for environmental contamination appears to be low since it does not leave residues in the environment. At this stage the risk of non-target impacts (by-kill) is thought to be acceptably low using paste formulations, although more recent assessments have shown that some birds are more susceptible to PAPP than previously anticipated.
