= Ammonium salicylate =

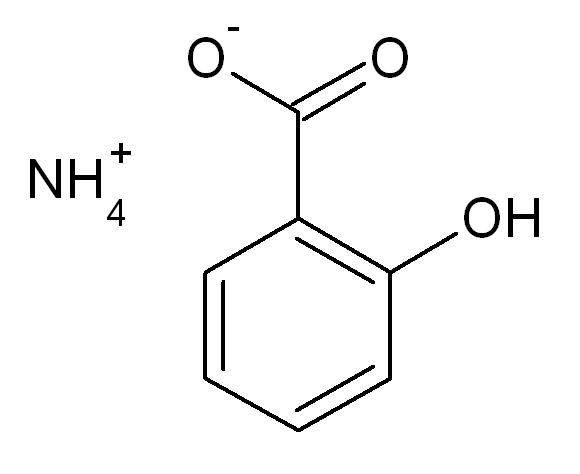

Names
- IUPAC name Ammonium 2-carboxyphenolate

Identifiers
CAS Number	528-94-9
3D model (JSmol)	Interactive image
ChemSpider	=.html 10265 =
ECHA InfoCard	100.007.678
EC Number	208-444-9
PubChem CID	54697583
UNII	0T3Q181657
CompTox Dashboard (EPA)	DTXSID30883424
- InChI: InChI=1S/C7H6O3.H3N/c8-6-4-2-1-3-5(6)7(9)10;/h1-4,8H,(H,9,10);1H3 Key: BOFZOTMTKBQRAB-UHFFFAOYSA-N
- SMILES: C1=CC=C(C(=C1)C(=O)O)[O-].[NH4+]

Properties
Chemical formula	C_{7}H_{9}NO_{3}
Molar mass	155.153 g·mol^{−1}
Appearance	colorless powder
Solubility in water	soluble

Hazards
- GHS labelling
Pictograms	(GHS07: Exclamation mark)
- Except where otherwise noted, data are given for materials in their standard state (at 25 °C [77 °F], 100 kPa). Infobox references

Ammonium salicylate is a chemical compound with the chemical formula NH_{4}C_{6}H_{4}(OH)COO.

== Synthesis ==
The effect of ammonia solution on salicylic acid in an inert atmosphere:

NH_{3} + C_{6}H_{4}(OH)COOH → NH_{4}C_{6}H_{4}(OH)COO

== Physical properties ==
Ammonium salicylate forms colorless crystals that are highly soluble in water and ethanol. The compound decomposes at 213°C.

== Uses ==
The compound is commonly used in several industries, such as pharmaceuticals, cosmetics, and agriculture.

As a drug, it is used in cases of topical skin diseases, relief of various muscle pains and as a component of several medications. Under exposure to light it discolors with the release of ammonia. It easily discolors iron compounds, and it forms a slightly acidic solution in water.
