= 1,3-Difluoro-2-propanol =

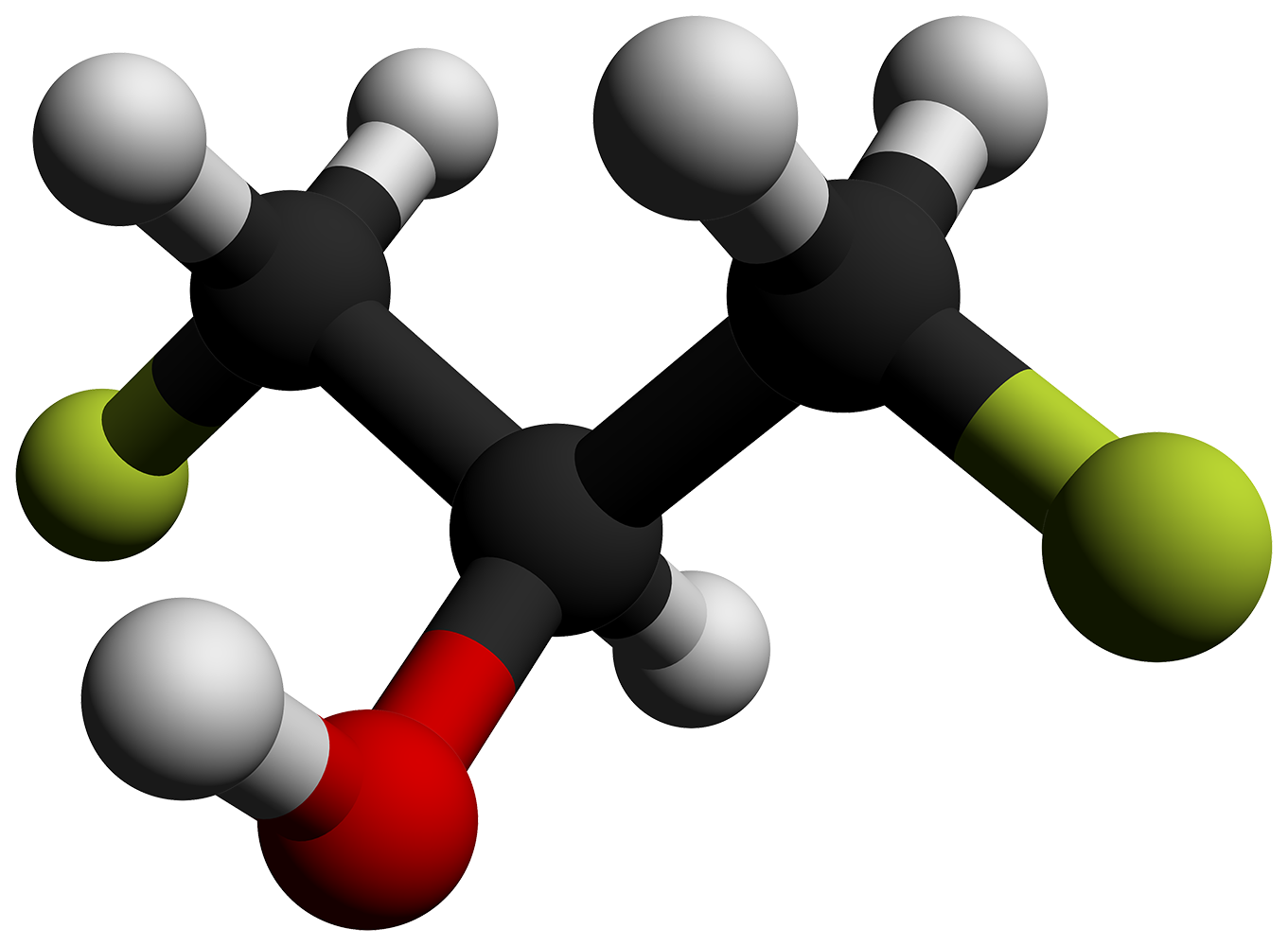

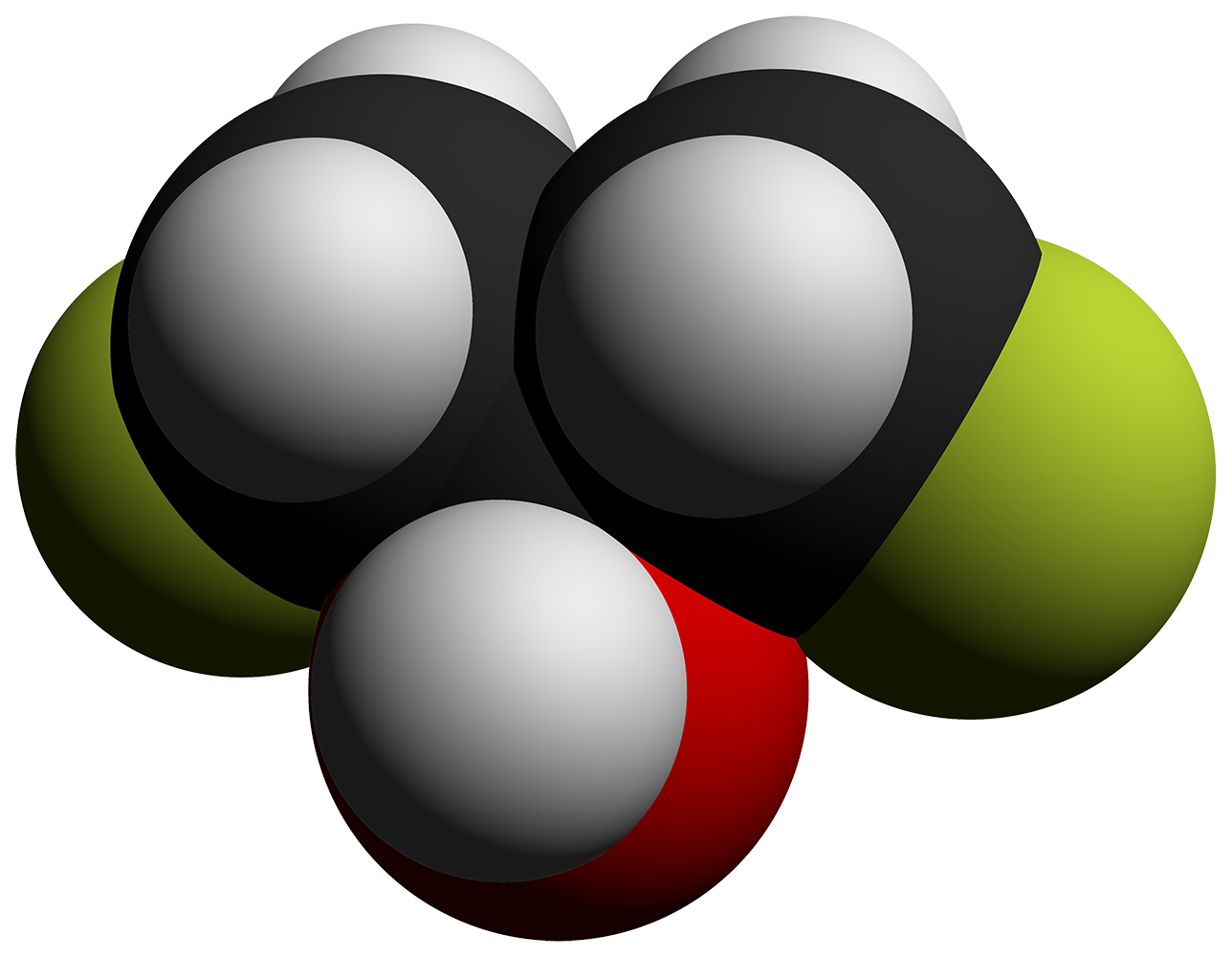

Names
- Preferred IUPAC name 1,3-Difluoropropan-2-ol

Identifiers
| CAS Number | 453-13-4 |
| 3D model (JSmol) | Interactive image; Interactive image |
| ChemSpider | 61300 |
| ECHA InfoCard | 100.006.561 |
| PubChem CID | 67985 |
| UNII | R8ZM2LQG7K |
| CompTox Dashboard (EPA) | DTXSID1060009 |
- InChI: InChI=1S/C3H6F2O/c4-1-3(6)2-5/h3,6H,1-2H2 Key: PVDLUGWWIOGCNH-UHFFFAOYSA-N; InChI=1/C3H6F2O/c4-1-3(6)2-5/h3,6H,1-2H2 Key: PVDLUGWWIOGCNH-UHFFFAOYAJ
- SMILES: OC(CF)CF; FCC(O)CF

Properties
| Chemical formula | C_{3}H_{6}F_{2}O |
| Molar mass | 96.077 g·mol^{−1} |
| Density | 1.24 g/cm^{3} (at 25 °C) |
| Boiling point | 54 to 55 °C (129 to 131 °F; 327 to 328 K) |

Hazards
| Flash point | 42 °C (108 °F; 315 K) |
- Except where otherwise noted, data are given for materials in their standard state (at 25 °C [77 °F], 100 kPa). verify (what is ?) Infobox references

1,3-Difluoro-2-propanol is a metabolic poison which disrupts the citric acid cycle and is used as a rodenticide, similar to sodium fluoroacetate. It is the main ingredient (along with 1-chloro-3-fluoro-2-propanol) in the rodenticide product Gliftor (or Glyftor) which was widely used in the former USSR and still approved in China.

== See also ==
- 1,3-Dichloro-2-propanol
