= Acryloyl chloride =

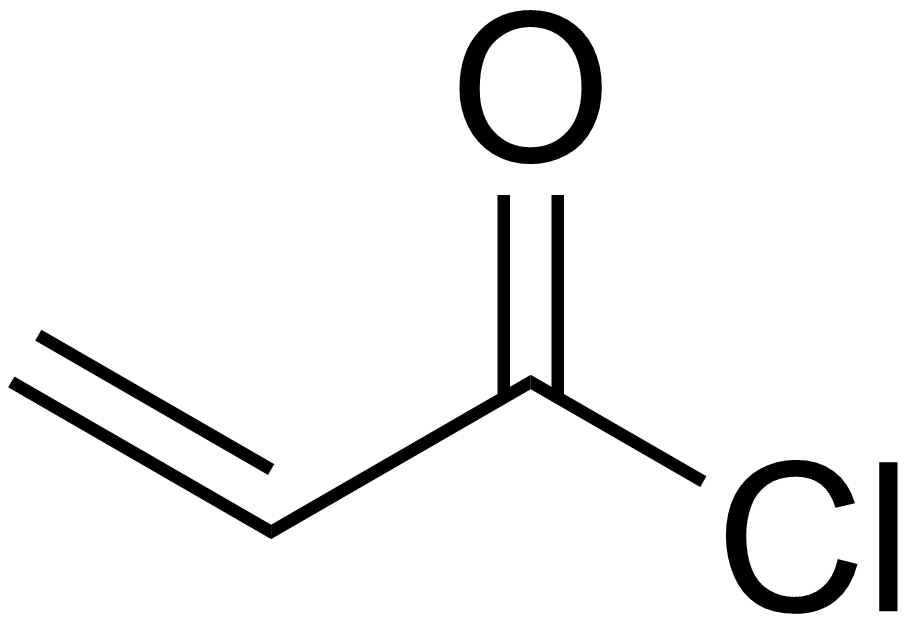
- Skeletal formula

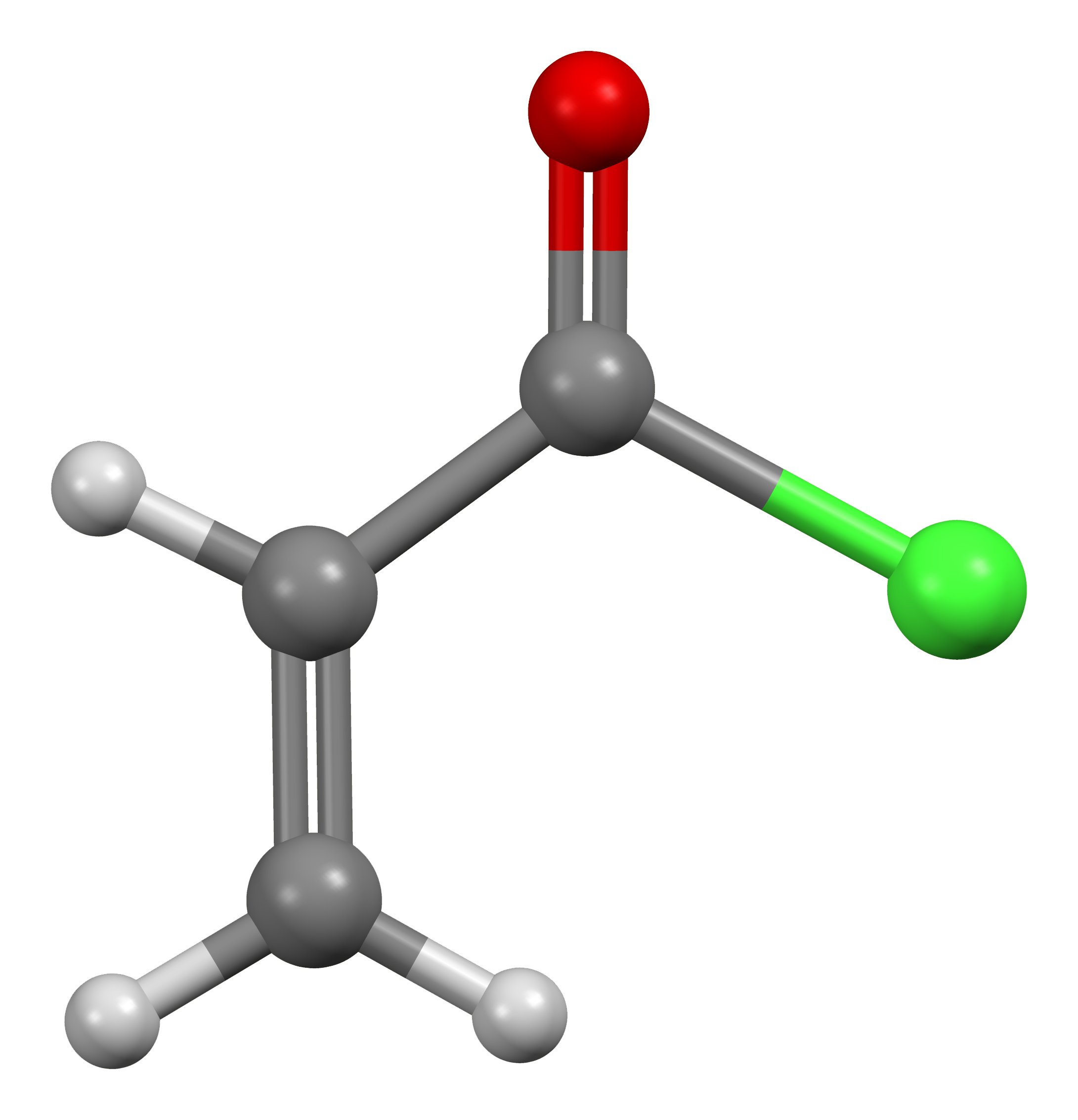
- Ball-and-stick model

Names
- Preferred IUPAC name Prop-2-enoyl chloride
- Other names 2-Propenoyl chloride

Identifiers
CAS Number	814-68-6
3D model (JSmol)	Interactive image
ChemSpider	12588
ECHA InfoCard	100.011.272
PubChem CID	13140
UNII	8K23O56TG5
CompTox Dashboard (EPA)	DTXSID1061150
- InChI: InChI=1S/C3H3ClO/c1-2-3(4)5/h2H,1H2 Key: HFBMWMNUJJDEQZ-UHFFFAOYSA-N; InChI=1/C3H3ClO/c1-2-3(4)5/h2H,1H2 Key: HFBMWMNUJJDEQZ-UHFFFAOYAZ
- SMILES: ClC(=O)C=C

Properties
Chemical formula	C_{3}H_{3}ClO
Molar mass	90.51 g·mol^{−1}
Density	1.119 g/cm^{3}
Boiling point	75.0 °C (167.0 °F; 348.1 K)

Hazards
- GHS labelling
Pictograms	(GHS02: Flammable) (GHS05: Corrosive) (GHS06: Toxic)
Signal word	Danger
Hazard statements	H225, H302, H314, H330
Precautionary statements	P210, P280, P301+P330+P331, P303+P361+P353, P305+P351+P338, P310
Flash point	−4 °C (25 °F; 269 K)
- Except where otherwise noted, data are given for materials in their standard state (at 25 °C [77 °F], 100 kPa). verify (what is ?) Infobox references

Acryloyl chloride, also known as 2-propenoyl chloride, acrylyl chloride, or acrylic acid chloride, is the organic compound with the formula CH_{2}=CHCO(Cl). It is a colorless liquid, although aged samples appear yellow. It belongs to the acid chlorides group of compounds.

== Preparation ==
Acryloyl chloride can be efficiently prepared by treating acrylic acid with benzoyl chloride:

CH_{2}=CHCO_{2}H + C_{6}H_{5}COCl → CH_{2}=CHCOCl + C_{6}H_{5}CO_{2}H

Conventional phosphorus-based chlorinating agents, e.g. phosphorus trichloride, are ineffective. Flow conditions allows use of a broadened range of chlorinating agents including oxalyl chloride and thionyl chloride.

== Reactions ==
This compound undergoes the reactions common for acid chlorides. For example, it reacts readily with water, producing acrylic acid. When treated with sodium salts of carboxylic acids, the anhydride is formed. Reactions with alcohols and amines gives esters and amides, respectively. It acylates organozinc compounds.

Acryloyl chloride is most commonly employed for the introduction of acrylic groups into other compounds, e.g. the preparation of acrylate monomers and polymers.

== Toxicity ==
Acryloyl chloride, like volatile acid chlorides, is a skin irritant, with pulmonary edema in more severe exposures. Other signs and symptoms of acute exposure may include headache, dizziness, and weakness. Gastrointestinal effects may include nausea, vomiting, diarrhea, and stomach ulceration.

== See also ==
- Methacryloyl chloride
- List of extremely hazardous substances
