= Fluoroacetate =

Chemistry set

Fluoroacetate may refer to:

- Salts of fluoroacetic acid such as sodium fluoroacetate
- Fluoroacetate anion (FCH_{2}CO^{−}_{2}), a conjugate base of fluoroacetic acid
- Esters of fluoroacetic acid
  - 2-Fluoroethyl fluoroacetate
  - Methyl fluoroacetate
  - Fluoroaspirin
  - 2-Ethylhexyl fluoroacetate
