= Fluoroethyl fluoroacetate =

2-Fluoroethyl fluoroacetate

Names
- Preferred IUPAC name 2-Fluoroethyl fluoroacetate
- Other names TL-855

Identifiers
CAS Number	459-99-4
3D model (JSmol)	Interactive image
ChemSpider	9598
PubChem CID	9992
UNII	NR4H23SR3Q
CompTox Dashboard (EPA)	DTXSID20196651
- InChI: InChI=1S/C4H6F2O2/c5-1-2-8-4(7)3-6/h1-3H2 Key: ZIJVALRYXQXDOL-UHFFFAOYSA-N
- SMILES: C(CF)OC(=O)CF

Properties
Chemical formula	FCH_{2}CO_{2}CH_{2}CH_{2}F
Molar mass	124.087 g·mol^{−1}
Appearance	Liquid

Hazards
- Occupational safety and health (OHS/OSH)
Main hazards	Extremely toxic
- Lethal dose or concentration (LD, LC)
LD_{50} (median dose)	8500 ug/kg (mouse, subcutaneous)
LD_{Lo} (lowest published)	1 mg/kg (oral, rats)
LC_{50} (median concentration)	150 mg/m3, 10M (rat, inhalation); 450 ug/m3 (mouse, inhalation); 50 mg/m3 (rabbit, inhalation); 70 mg/m3, 10M (guinea pig, inhalation)
- Except where otherwise noted, data are given for materials in their standard state (at 25 °C [77 °F], 100 kPa). Infobox references

Fluoroethyl fluoroacetate, or more accurately 2-fluoroethyl fluoroacetate, is an organic compound with the chemical formula FCH_{2}CO_{2}CH_{2}CH_{2}F. It is the fluoroacetate ester of 2-fluoroethanol, or in other words, the 2-fluoroethyl ester of fluoroacetic acid. 2-Fluoroethyl fluoroacetate is two times more toxic than methyl fluoroacetate.

== See also ==
- Methyl fluoroacetate
- Fluoroacetic acid
- Sodium fluoroacetate
- Fluoroacetamide
- 2-Fluoroethanol
