= Methacryloyl chloride =

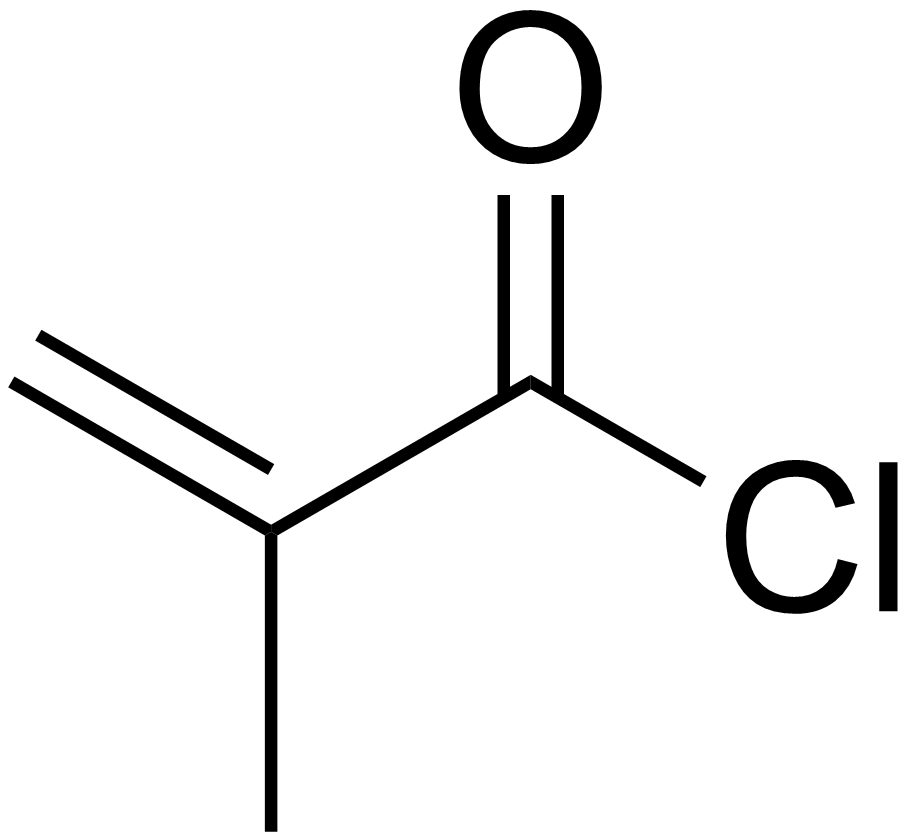
Skeletal formula of methacryloyl chloride
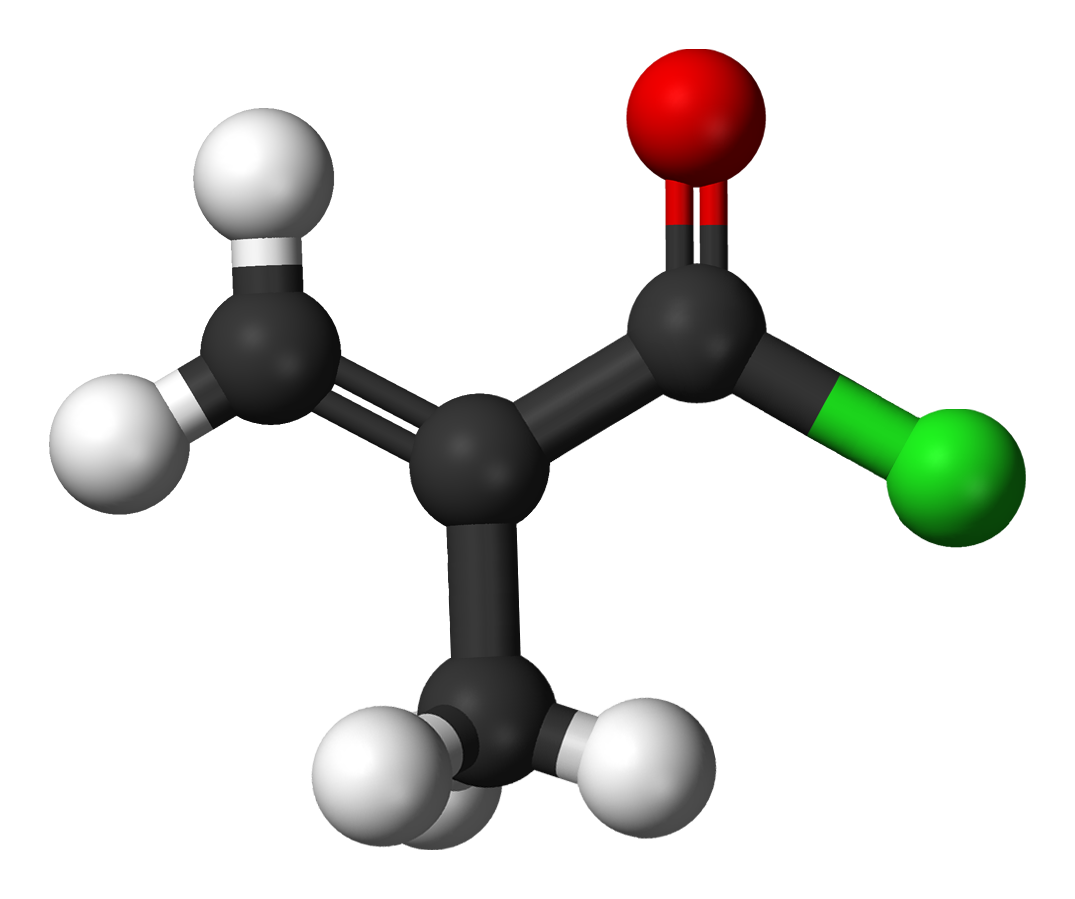
Ball-and-stick model of methacryloyl chloride

Names
- Preferred IUPAC name 2-Methylprop-2-enoyl chloride
- Other names Methacryloyl chloride

Identifiers
CAS Number	920-46-7
3D model (JSmol)	Interactive image
ChemSpider	12940
ECHA InfoCard	100.011.872
EC Number	213-058-9
PubChem CID	13528
UNII	L76O6653IO
CompTox Dashboard (EPA)	DTXSID6061280
- InChI: InChI=1S/C4H5ClO/c1-3(2)4(5)6/h1H2,2H3 Key: VHRYZQNGTZXDNX-UHFFFAOYSA-N; InChI=1/C4H5ClO/c1-3(2)4(5)6/h1H2,2H3 Key: VHRYZQNGTZXDNX-UHFFFAOYAG
- SMILES: CC(=C)C(=O)Cl

Properties
Chemical formula	C_{4}H_{5}ClO
Molar mass	104.53 g·mol^{−1}
Density	1.07 g/mL
Boiling point	95 to 96 °C (203 to 205 °F; 368 to 369 K)
Solubility in water	Reacts

Hazards
Safety data sheet (SDS)	CAMEO Chemicals MSDS
- Except where otherwise noted, data are given for materials in their standard state (at 25 °C [77 °F], 100 kPa). verify (what is ?) Infobox references

Methacryloyl chloride is the acid chloride of methacrylic acid used to manufacture polymers.

== See also ==
- Acryloyl chloride
