= Sodium fluoroacetate =

Names
- IUPAC name Sodium 2-fluoroacetate
- Other names: 1080; Compound 1080; SFA; Sodium monofluoroacetate

Identifiers
CAS Number	62-74-8
3D model (JSmol)	Interactive image
Beilstein Reference	3915223
ChEBI	CHEBI:38699
ChEMBL	ChEMBL369611
ChemSpider	5893
ECHA InfoCard	100.000.499
EC Number	200-548-2
Gmelin Reference	470376
KEGG	C18588
PubChem CID	16212360
RTECS number	AH9100000
UNII	166WTM3843
UN number	2629
CompTox Dashboard (EPA)	DTXSID8024311
- InChI: InChI=1S/C2H3FO2.Na/c3-1-2(4)5;/h1H2,(H,4,5);/q;+1/p-1 Key: JGFYQVQAXANWJU-UHFFFAOYSA-M; InChI=1/C2H3FO2.Na/c3-1-2(4)5;/h1H2,(H,4,5);/q;+1/p-1 Key: JGFYQVQAXANWJU-REWHXWOFAP
- SMILES: [Na+].[O-]C(=O)CF

Properties
Chemical formula	FCH_{2}CO_{2}Na
Molar mass	100.024 g·mol^{−1}
Appearance	Fluffy colorless to white powder or crystals
Odor	odorless
Melting point	200 °C (392 °F; 473 K)
Boiling point	Decomposes
Solubility in water	soluble

Hazards
- Occupational safety and health (OHS/OSH)
Main hazards	Toxic
- GHS labelling
Pictograms	(GHS06: Toxic) (GHS09: Environmental hazard)
Signal word	Danger
Hazard statements	H300, H310, H330, H400
Precautionary statements	P260, P262, P264, P270, P271, P273, P280, P284, P301+P310, P302+P350, P304+P340, P310, P320, P321, P330, P361, P363, P391, P403+P233, P405, P501
NFPA 704 (fire diamond)	4 0 0
Flash point	?
- Lethal dose or concentration (LD, LC)
LD_{50} (median dose)	1.7 mg/kg (rat, oral); 0.34 mg/kg (rabbit, oral); 0.1 mg/kg (rat, oral); 0.3 mg/kg (guinea pig, oral); 0.1 mg/kg (mouse, oral)
- NIOSH (US health exposure limits)
PEL (Permissible)	TWA 0.05 mg/m^{3} [skin]
REL (Recommended)	TWA 0.05 mg/m^{3} ST 0.15 mg/m^{3} [skin]
IDLH (Immediate danger)	2.5 mg/m^{3}
- Except where otherwise noted, data are given for materials in their standard state (at 25 °C [77 °F], 100 kPa). verify (what is ?) Infobox references

Sodium fluoroacetate, also known by its trade name as a mammal poison compound 1080, is an organofluorine chemical compound with the chemical formula FCH_{2}CO_{2}Na. It is the sodium salt of fluoroacetic acid, and contains sodium cations Na^{+} and fluoroacetate anions FCH_{2}CO^{−}_{2}. A colourless salt with a taste similar to table salt (sodium chloride), it is used under the name "1080" to kill small and medium mammals, including rodents, especially in New Zealand, which accounts for around 80% of its use as a toxin. New Zealand has no endemic ground-based mammals and uses it particularly to kill introduced brushtail possums, often with aerial distribution of bait pellets.

== Natural occurrence ==
Fluoroacetate occurs naturally in at least 40 plants in Australia, Brazil, and Africa. It is one of about twenty organofluorine-containing natural products.

=== Fluoroacetate occurrence in Gastrolobium species ===
Gastrolobium is a genus of flowering plants in the family Fabaceae. This genus consists of over 100 species, and all but two are native to the southwest region of Western Australia, where they are known as "poison peas". Gastrolobium growing in southwestern Australia concentrate fluoroacetate from low-fluoride soils. The brushtail possums, bush rats, and western grey kangaroos native to this region are capable of safely eating plants containing fluoroacetate, but livestock and introduced species from elsewhere in Australia, and even the eastern populations of the brushtail possum and bush rat, are highly susceptible to the poison, as are species introduced from outside Australia, such as the red fox. The fact that many Gastrolobium species also have high secondary toxicity to non-native carnivores is thought to have limited the ability of cats to establish populations in locations where the plants form a major part of the understorey vegetation.

The presence of Gastrolobium species in Western Australia has often forced farmers to 'scalp' their land, that is, remove the top soil and any poison pea seed which it may contain, and replace it with a new poison pea-free top soil sourced from elsewhere in which to sow crops. Similarly, after bushfires in north-western Queensland, cattlemen have to move livestock before the poisonous Gastrolobium grandiflorum emerges from the ashes.

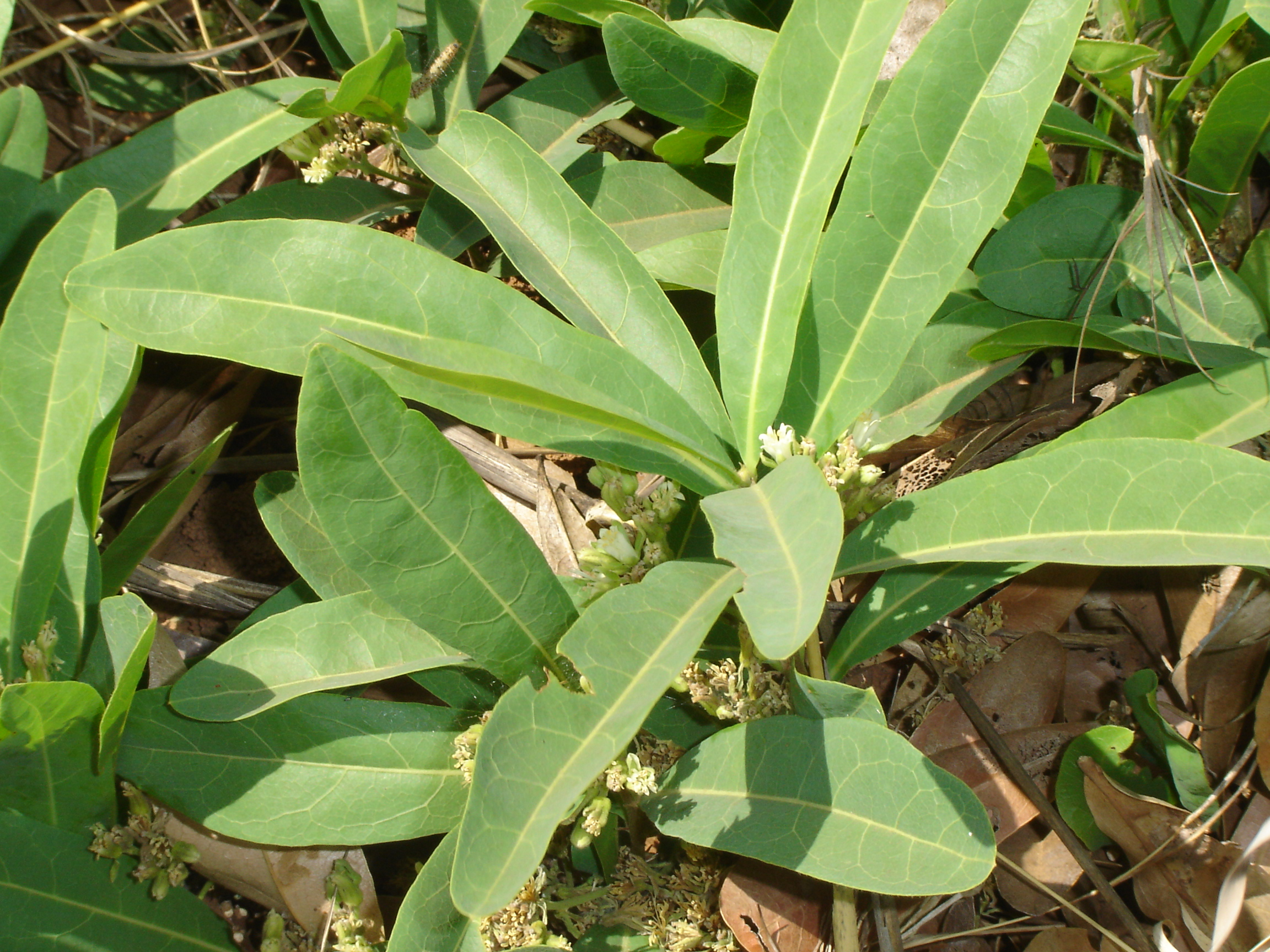
Dichapetalum cymosum

The related compound potassium fluoroacetate occurs naturally as a defensive compound in at least 40 plant species in Australia, New Zealand, Brazil, and Africa. It was first identified in Dichapetalum cymosum, commonly known as gifblaar or poison leaf, by Marais in 1944. As early as 1904, colonists in Sierra Leone used extracts of Chailletia toxicaria, which also contains fluoroacetic acid or its salts, to poison rats. Several native Australian plant genera contain the toxin, including Gastrolobium, Gompholobium, Oxylobium, Nemcia, and Acacia. New Zealand's native Puha contains sodium fluoroacetate in very low concentrations.

== Structure and synthesis ==
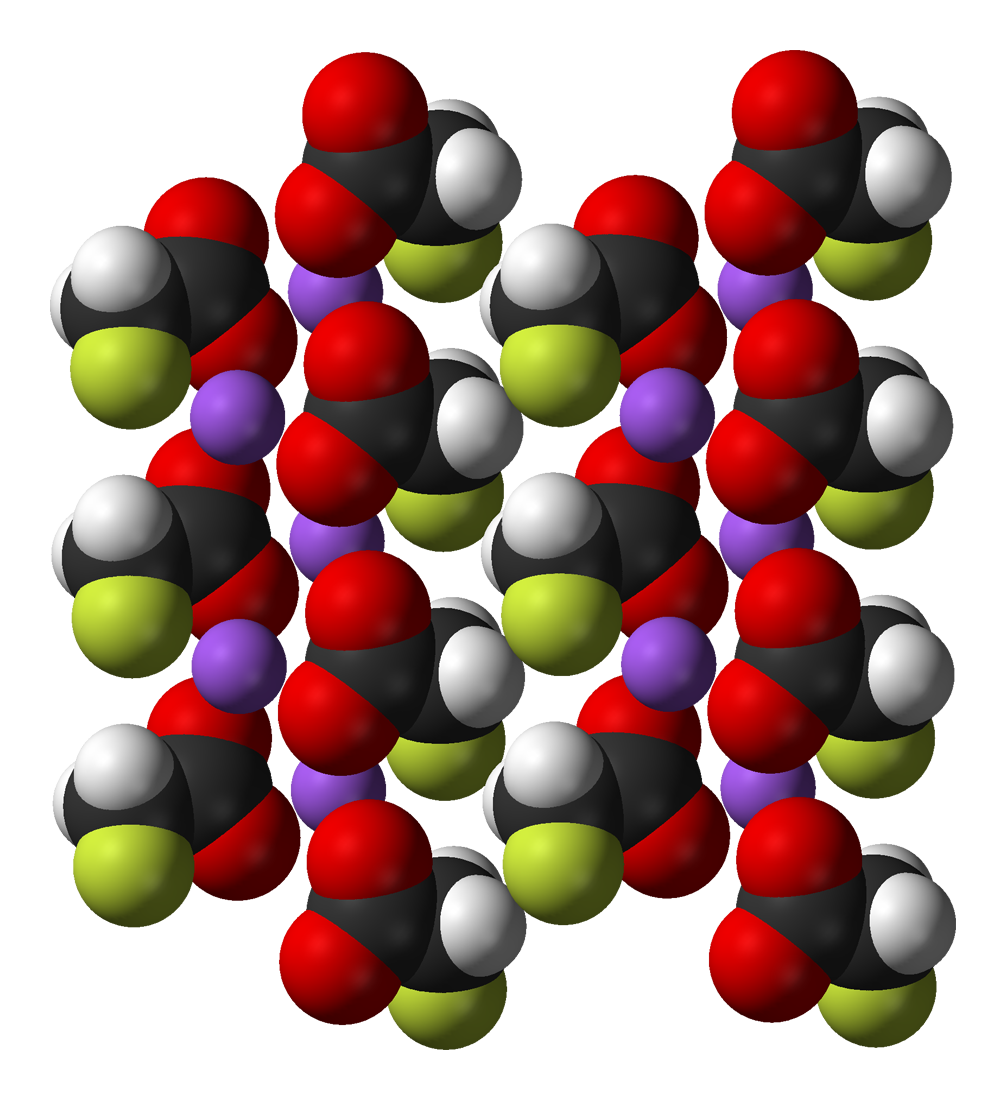
Packing of sodium fluoroacetate in a crystal. Sodium, Na Carbon Hydrogen, H Oxygen Fluorine, F

X-ray crystallography confirms that solid sodium fluoroacetate is a salt with intact fluoroacetate anions interacting with Na^{+} via a network of Na-O bonds.

Sodium fluoroacetate can be produced by the reaction of fluoroacetic acid and a basic sodium salt, such as sodium carbonate and sodium hydroxide. However, it is industrially produced by treating sodium chloroacetate with potassium fluoride.

== Toxicology ==
Sodium fluoroacetate is toxic to most obligate aerobic organisms, and highly toxic to mammals and insects. The oral dose of sodium fluoroacetate sufficient to be lethal in humans is 2–10 mg/kg.

The toxicity varies with species. The New Zealand Food Safety Authority established lethal doses for a number of species. Dogs, cats, and pigs appear to be most susceptible to poisoning.

The enzyme fluoroacetate dehalogenase has been discovered in a soil bacterium, which can detoxify fluoroacetate in the surrounding medium.

=== Mechanism of action ===
Fluoroacetate is structurally similar to acetate, which has a pivotal role in cellular metabolism. This similarity is the basis of the toxicity of fluoroacetate. Two related mechanisms for its toxicity have been discussed, with both beginning with the conversion of fluoroacetate to 2-fluorocitrate. 2-Fluorocitrate arises by condensation with oxaloacetate with fluoroacetyl coenzyme A, catalyzed by citrate synthase. Fluorocitrate binds very tightly to aconitase, thereby halting the citric acid cycle. This inhibition results in an accumulation of citrate in the blood. Citrate and fluorocitrate are allosteric inhibitors of phosphofructokinase-1 (PFK-1), a key enzyme in glycolysis. When PFK-1 is inhibited, cells are no longer able to metabolize carbohydrates, depriving them of energy. Alternatively, fluorocitrate interferes with citrate transport in the mitochondria.

=== Symptoms ===
In humans, the symptoms of poisoning normally appear between 30 minutes and three hours after exposure. Initial symptoms typically include nausea, vomiting, and abdominal pain; sweating, confusion, and agitation follow. In significant poisoning, cardiac abnormalities including tachycardia or bradycardia, hypotension, and ECG changes develop. Neurological effects include muscle twitching and seizures; consciousness becomes progressively impaired after a few hours leading to coma. Death is normally due to ventricular arrhythmias, progressive hypotension unresponsive to treatment, and aspiration pneumonia.

Symptoms in domestic animals vary: dogs tend to show nervous system signs such as convulsions, vocalization, and uncontrollable running, while large herbivores such as cattle and sheep more predominantly show cardiac signs.

Sub-lethal doses of sodium fluoroacetate may cause damage to tissues with high energy needs, especially the brain, gonads, heart, lungs. Fetuses are also highly susceptible. Sub-lethal doses are typically completely metabolised and excreted within four days.

=== Treatment ===
Effective antidotes are unknown. Research in monkeys has shown that the use of glyceryl monoacetate can prevent problems if given after ingestion of sodium fluoroacetate, and this therapy has been tested in domestic animals with some positive results. In theory, glyceryl monoacetate supplies acetate ions to allow continuation of cellular respiration which the sodium fluoroacetate had disrupted.

Experiments of N. V. Goncharov and co-workers resulted in development of two varieties of potentially successful treatments. One combines a phenothiazine compound and a dioic acid compound. The other includes a phenothiazine compound, a nitroester compound, and ethanol.

In clinical cases, use of muscle relaxants, anti-convulsants, mechanical ventilation, and other supportive measures may all be required.

=== Tolerance ===
Animals can tolerate varying amounts of fluoroacetate. Mammalian carnivores and rodents tend to be the least tolerant, followed by mammalian herbivores, reptiles and amphibians, and finally fish. A lower metabolic rate seems to help with poison tolerance in general.

Many animals native to Australia seem to have developed additional tolerance to fluoroacetate beyond what general trends predict. Herbivore, seed-eating birds are exposed to very high amounts of natural fluoroacetate with no ill effect. Emus living in areas where fluoroacetate-producing plants grow can tolerate 150 times the concentration compared to emus living outside. Some native insects tolerate fluoroacetate and repurpose it as a defense chemical against carnivores.

Fluoacetate tolerance can be acquired in animals, though it is not fully clear how. In one study, sheep gut bacteria were genetically engineered to contain the fluoroacetate dehalogenase enzyme that inactivates sodium fluoroacetate. The bacteria were administered to sheep, who then showed reduced signs of toxicity after sodium fluoroacetate ingestion. A strain of natural bacterium that does the same was isolated from cattle rumen in 2012.

== Pesticide use ==
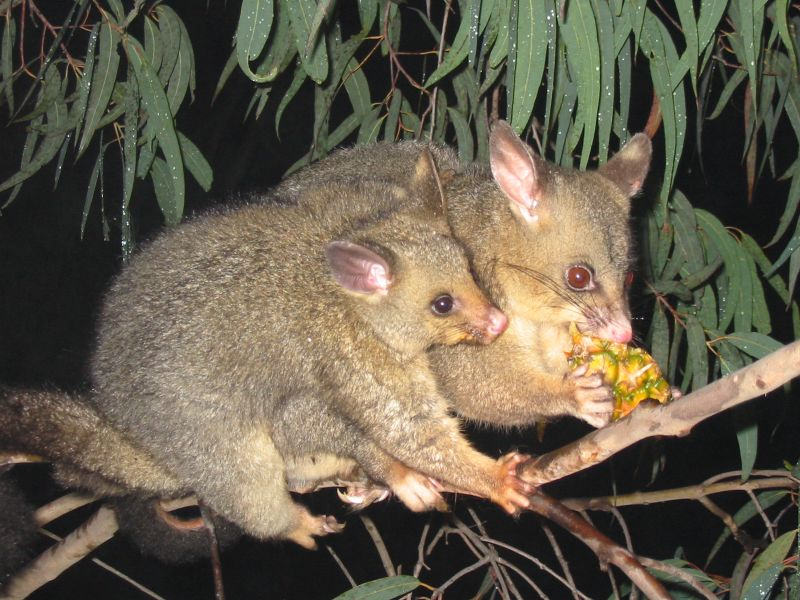
Common brushtail possum, an invasive pest in New Zealand whose population is controlled with sodium fluoroacetate

=== History and production ===
The effectiveness of sodium fluoroacetate as a rodenticide was reported in 1942. The salt is synthesized by treating sodium chloroacetate with potassium fluoride. Both sodium and potassium salts are derivatives of fluoroacetic acid. The name "1080" refers to the catalogue number of the poison, which became its brand name.

Sodium fluoroacetate is used as a pesticide, especially for mammalian pest species. The agricultural industry uses 1080 to kill herbivorous mammals to stop them from eating pasture plants and crops. In New Zealand and Australia it is also used to control introduced, invasive non-native mammals that prey on or compete with native wildlife and vegetation.

=== Australia ===
In Australia, sodium fluoroacetate was first used in rabbit control programmes in the early 1950s, where it is regarded as having "a long history of proven effectiveness". It is seen as a critical component of the integrated pest-control programmes for rabbits, foxes, wild dogs, and feral pigs. Since 1994, broad-scale fox control using 1080 meat baits in Western Australia has significantly improved the population numbers of several native species and led, for the first time, to three species of mammals being taken off the state's endangered species list. In Australia, minor direct mortality of native animal populations from 1080 baits is regarded as acceptable by the regulatory bodies, compared to the predatory and competitive effects of those introduced species being managed using 1080. 1080 is also used by the agricultural industry to destroy populations of Dingos, Australia's only pre-colonial mammalian apex predator, a practice condemned by numerous conservation groups and wildlife experts around the continent due to its far-reaching destabilisation of the natural balance of the ecosystem.

Western Shield is a project to boost populations of endangered mammals in south-west Australia conducted by the Department of Environment and Conservation of Western Australia. The project entails distributing fluoroacetate-baited meat from the air to kill predators. Wild dogs and foxes will readily eat the baited meat. Cats pose a greater difficulty as they are generally not interested in scavenging. However, an Australian RSPCA-commissioned study criticized 1080, calling it an inhumane killer. Some Western Australian herbivores (notably, the local subspecies of the tammar wallaby, Macropus eugenii derbianus, but not the subspecies M. e. eugenii of southern Australia and M. e. decres on Kangaroo Island) have, by natural selection, developed partial immunity to the effects of fluoroacetate, so that its use as a poison may reduce collateral damage to some native herbivores specific to that area.

In 2011, over 3,750 toxic baits containing 3 ml of 1080 were laid across 520 properties over 48,000 hectares (120,000 acres) between the Tasmanian settlements of Southport and Hobart as part of an ongoing attempt at the world's biggest invasive animal eradication operation – the eradication of red foxes from the island state. The baits were spread at the rate of one per 10 hectares and were buried, to mitigate the risk to non-target wildlife species like Tasmanian devils. Native animals are also targeted with 1080. During May 2005 up to 200,000 Bennett's wallabies on King Island were intentionally killed in one of the largest coordinated 1080 poisonings seen in Tasmania.

In 2016, PAPP (para-amino propiophenone) became available for use, which the RSPCA has endorsed as an alternative to 1080, due in part to its ability to kill faster and cause less suffering, as well as having an antidote, which 1080 does not. However, as of June 2023, 1080 was still being used in attempts to reduce feral cat populations.

=== New Zealand ===
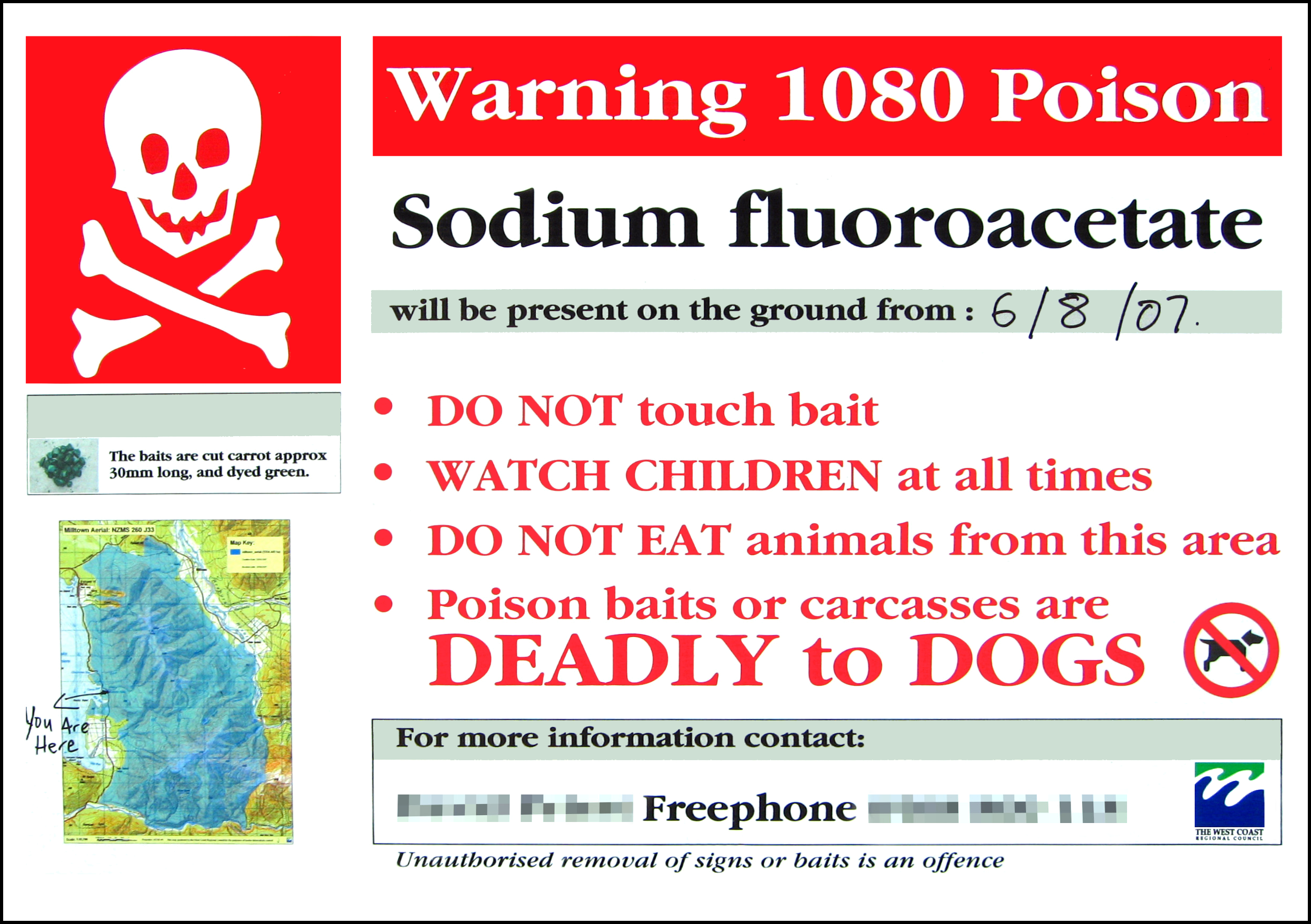
Sign warning of poisonous sodium fluoroacetate baits on the West Coast of New Zealand

Worldwide, New Zealand is the largest user of sodium fluoroacetate. This high usage is attributable to the fact that, apart from two species of bat, New Zealand has no native land mammals, and some of those that have been introduced have had devastating effects on vegetation and native species. 1080 is used to control possums, rats, stoats, deer, and rabbits. The largest users, despite some vehement opposition, are OSPRI New Zealand and the Department of Conservation.

=== United States ===
Sodium fluoroacetate is used in the United States to kill coyotes. Prior to 1972 when the EPA cancelled all uses, sodium fluoroacetate was used much more widely as a cheap predacide and rodenticide; in 1985, the restricted-use "toxic collar" approval was finalized.

=== Other countries ===
1080 is used as a rodenticide in Mexico, Japan, Korea, and Israel. In Israel 0.05% sodium fluoroacetate whole wheat grain baits are used to prevent heavy crop loss to field crops during mass outbreaks of the field rodents Microtus guentheri, Meriones tristrami and Mus musculus populations.

== Environmental impacts ==
=== Water ===
Because 1080 is highly water-soluble, it will be dispersed and diluted in the environment by rain, stream water, and ground water. Sodium fluoroacetate at the concentrations found in the environment after standard baiting operations will break down in natural water containing living organisms, such as aquatic plants or micro-organisms. Water-monitoring surveys, conducted during the 1990s, have confirmed that significant contamination of waterways following aerial application of 1080 bait is possible, but unlikely. Research by NIWA showed that despite 1080 deliberately added to a stream, at with bait densities 10 times greater than found after normal control operations, no fish died after addition of 1080 baits. Testing was done 10m and 100m below, and 10m and 100m above where 1080 baits were placed.

In New Zealand, surface water is routinely monitored after aerial application of 1080, and water samples are collected immediately after application, when there is the highest possibility of detecting contamination. Of 2442 water samples tested in New Zealand between 1990 and 2010, following aerial 1080 operations: 96.5% had no detectable 1080 at all and, of all the samples, only six were equal to, or above the Ministry of Health level for drinking water, and none of these came from drinking water supplies. Of 592 samples taken from human or stock drinking supplies, only four contained detectable 1080 residues at 0.1ppb (1 sample) and 0.2 ppb (3 samples) – all well below the Ministry of Health level of 2 ppb.

In an experiment funded by the Animal Health Board and conducted by NIWA simulating the effects of rainfall on 1080 on a steep soil-covered hillside a few meters from a stream, it was found that 99.9% of the water containing 1080 leached straight into the soil (See 4.3 of) and did not flow over the ground to the stream as had been expected. The experiment also measured contamination of soil water, which was described as the water carried through the soil underground at short horizontal distances (0.5-3m), downhill toward the stream. The experiment did not measure contamination of deeper soil and ground water immediately beneath the site of application.

=== Soil ===
The fate of 1080 in the soil has been established by research defining the degradation of naturally occurring fluoroacetate (Oliver, 1977). Sodium fluoroacetate is water-soluble, and residues from uneaten baits leach into the soil where they are degraded to non-toxic metabolites by soil microorganisms, including bacteria (Pseudomonas) and the common soil fungus (Fusarium solani) (David and Gardiner, 1966; Bong, Cole and Walker, 1979; Walker and Bong, 1981).

=== Birds ===
Although it is now infrequent, individual aerial 1080 operations can still sometimes affect local bird populations if not carried out with sufficient care. In New Zealand, individuals from 19 species of native birds and 13 species of introduced birds have been found dead after aerial 1080 drops. Most of these recorded bird deaths were associated with only four operations in the 1970s that used poor-quality carrot baits with many small fragments. On the other hand, many native New Zealand bird populations have been successfully protected by reducing predator numbers through aerial 1080 operations. Kōkako, blue duck, New Zealand pigeon, kiwi, kaka, New Zealand falcon, tomtit, South Island robin, North Island robin, New Zealand parakeets (kākāriki), and yellowhead have all responded well to pest control programmes using aerial 1080 operations, with increased chick and adult survival, and increases in population size. In contrast, seven of 38 tagged kea, the endemic alpine parrot, were killed during an aerial possum control operation on the West Coast in August 2011. Because of their omnivorous feeding habits and inquisitive behaviour, kea are known to be particularly susceptible to 1080 poison baits, as well as other environmental poisons like the zinc and lead used in the flashings of backcountry huts and farm buildings. Recent research found that proximity to human-occupied sites where kea scrounge human food is inversely related to survival; the odds of survival increased by a factor of 6.9 for remote kea compared to those that lived near scrounging sites. High survival in remote areas is explained by innate neophobia and a short field-life of prefeed baits, which together preclude acceptance of poison baits as familiar food.

=== Reptiles and amphibians ===
Reptiles and amphibians are susceptible to 1080, although much less sensitive than mammals. Amphibian and reptile species that have been tested in Australia are generally more tolerant to 1080 poison than are most other animals. McIlroy (1992) calculated that even if lizards fed entirely on insects or other animals poisoned with 1080, they could never ingest enough poison to receive a lethal dose. This presents serious risks to people living traditionally in many areas of Australia, however, as reptiles - a vital food source for these people - can tolerate up to 10 times the toxic amount of sodium fluroacetate for humans, with the potential for serious poisoning if animals are consumed which have encountered baits.

Laboratory trials in New Zealand simulating worst-case scenarios indicate that both Leiopelma archeyi (Archey's frog) and L. hochstetteri (Hochstetter's frog) can absorb 1080 from contaminated water, substrate, or prey. The chance of this occurring in the wild is ameliorated by a variety of factors, including frog ecology. Captive maintenance and contamination problems rendered parts of this study inconclusive. Further population monitoring is recommended to provide more conclusive evidence than provided by this single study. In New Zealand, the secondary poisoning of feral cats and stoats following 1080 operations is likely to have a positive effect on the recovery of native skink and gecko populations. Killing rabbits and possums, which compete for food with skinks and geckos, may also have benefits.

=== Fish ===
Fish generally have very low sensitivity to 1080. Toxicity tests have been conducted in the US on bluegill sunfish, rainbow trout, and the freshwater invertebrate Daphnia magna. Tests at different 1080 concentrations on sunfish (for four days) and Daphnia (two days) showed that 1080 is "practically non-toxic" (a US EPA classification) to both these species. Rainbow trout were also tested over four days at four concentrations ranging from 39 to 170 mg 1080 per litre. From these results an LC50 (the concentration of 1080 per litre of water which theoretically kills 50% of the test fish) can be calculated. The LC50 for rainbow trout was calculated to be 54 mg 1080/litre – far in excess of any known concentration of 1080 found in water samples following 1080 aerial operations. Thus 1080 is unlikely to cause mortality in freshwater fish.

=== Invertebrates ===
Insects are susceptible to 1080 poisoning. Some field trials in New Zealand have shown that insect numbers can be temporarily reduced within 20 cm of toxic baits, but numbers return to normal levels within six days of the bait being removed. Other trials have found no evidence that insect communities are negatively affected. Another New Zealand study showed that wētā, native ants, and freshwater crayfish excrete 1080 within one to two weeks. There is also evidence that 1080 aerial operations in New Zealand can benefit invertebrate species. Both possums and rats are a serious threat to endemic invertebrates in New Zealand, where around 90 per cent of spiders and insects are endemic and have evolved without predatory mammals. In a study on the diet of brushtail possums, 47.5 per cent of possum faeces examined between January 1979 and June 1983 contained invertebrates, mostly insects. One possum can eat up to 60 endangered native land snails (Powelliphanta spp.) in one night.

== See also ==
- Fluoroacetic acid
- Fluoroacetamide
- Methyl fluoroacetate
- Fluoroethyl fluoroacetate
- Fluoroaspirin
