= Methacryloyloxyethyl isocyanate =

Names
- Preferred IUPAC name 2-Isocyanatoethyl 2-methylprop-2-enoate

Identifiers
CAS Number	30674-80-7
3D model (JSmol)	Interactive image
ChemSpider	32592
ECHA InfoCard	100.045.698
EC Number	250-284-7
PubChem CID	35409
UNII	828DBI7X91
CompTox Dashboard (EPA)	DTXSID6051986
- InChI: InChI=1S/C7H9NO3/c1-6(2)7(10)11-4-3-8-5-9/h1,3-4H2,2H3 Key: RBQRWNWVPQDTJJ-UHFFFAOYSA-N; InChI=1/C7H9NO3/c1-6(2)7(10)11-4-3-8-5-9/h1,3-4H2,2H3 Key: RBQRWNWVPQDTJJ-UHFFFAOYAT
- SMILES: CC(=C)C(=O)OCCN=C=O

Properties
Chemical formula	C_{7}H_{9}NO_{3}
Molar mass	155.153 g·mol^{−1}
- Except where otherwise noted, data are given for materials in their standard state (at 25 °C [77 °F], 100 kPa). Infobox references

Methacryloyloxyethyl isocyanate is an extremely poisonous liquid which can be fatal if inhaled, absorbed through skin, or consumed orally. To a lesser extent it can burn eyes and skin on contact. It is used as a cross-linker in the production of synthetic resins.
