= Glycerine acetate =

- R = H or CH_{3}C(=O)

Names
- Other names glycerol acetate glyceryl acetate 1,2,3-propanetriol acetate

Identifiers
CAS Number	1-monoacetin: 26446-35-5; 1,2-diacetin: 25395-31-7; triacetin: 102-76-1
3D model (JSmol)	1-monoacetin: Interactive image; 1,2-diacetin: Interactive image; triacetin: Interactive image
ChemSpider	1-monoacetin: 30918; 1,2-diacetin: 59412; triacetin: 13835706; 2-monacetin: 556638
ECHA InfoCard	100.014.216
EC Number	1-monoacetin: 247-704-6; 1,2-diacetin: 246-941-2; triacetin: 203-051-9
PubChem CID	1-monoacetin: 33510; 1,2-diacetin: 66021; triacetin: 5541
RTECS number	triacetin: AK3675000
UNII	triacetin: XHX3C3X673
- InChI: 1-monoacetin: InChI=1S/C5H10O4/c1-4(7)9-3-5(8)2-6/h5-6,8H,2-3H2,1H3 Key: KMZHZAAOEWVPSE-UHFFFAOYSA-N; 1,2-diacetin: InChI=1S/C7H12O5/c1-5(9)11-4-7(3-8)12-6(2)10/h7-8H,3-4H2,1-2H3 Key: UXDDRFCJKNROTO-UHFFFAOYSA-N; triacetin: InChI=1S/C9H14O6/c1-6(10)13-4-9(15-8(3)12)5-14-7(2)11/h9H,4-5H2,1-3H3 Key: URAYPUMNDPQOKB-UHFFFAOYSA-N
- SMILES: 1-monoacetin: CC(=O)OCC(CO)O; 1,2-diacetin: CC(=O)OCC(CO)OC(=O)C; triacetin: CC(=O)OCC(COC(=O)C)OC(=O)C

Properties
Chemical formula	Variable
Molar mass	Variable
- Except where otherwise noted, data are given for materials in their standard state (at 25 °C [77 °F], 100 kPa). Infobox references

Glycerine acetate is a mixture of esters produced from the esterification of glycerol (1) with acetic acid. This reaction produces five congeners:

- the two monoacetylglycerols / MAG / monoacetin (2 and 3)
- the two diacetylglycerols / DAG / diacetin / glyceryl diacetate (4 and 5)
- the one triacetalglycerol / TAG / triacetin (6)

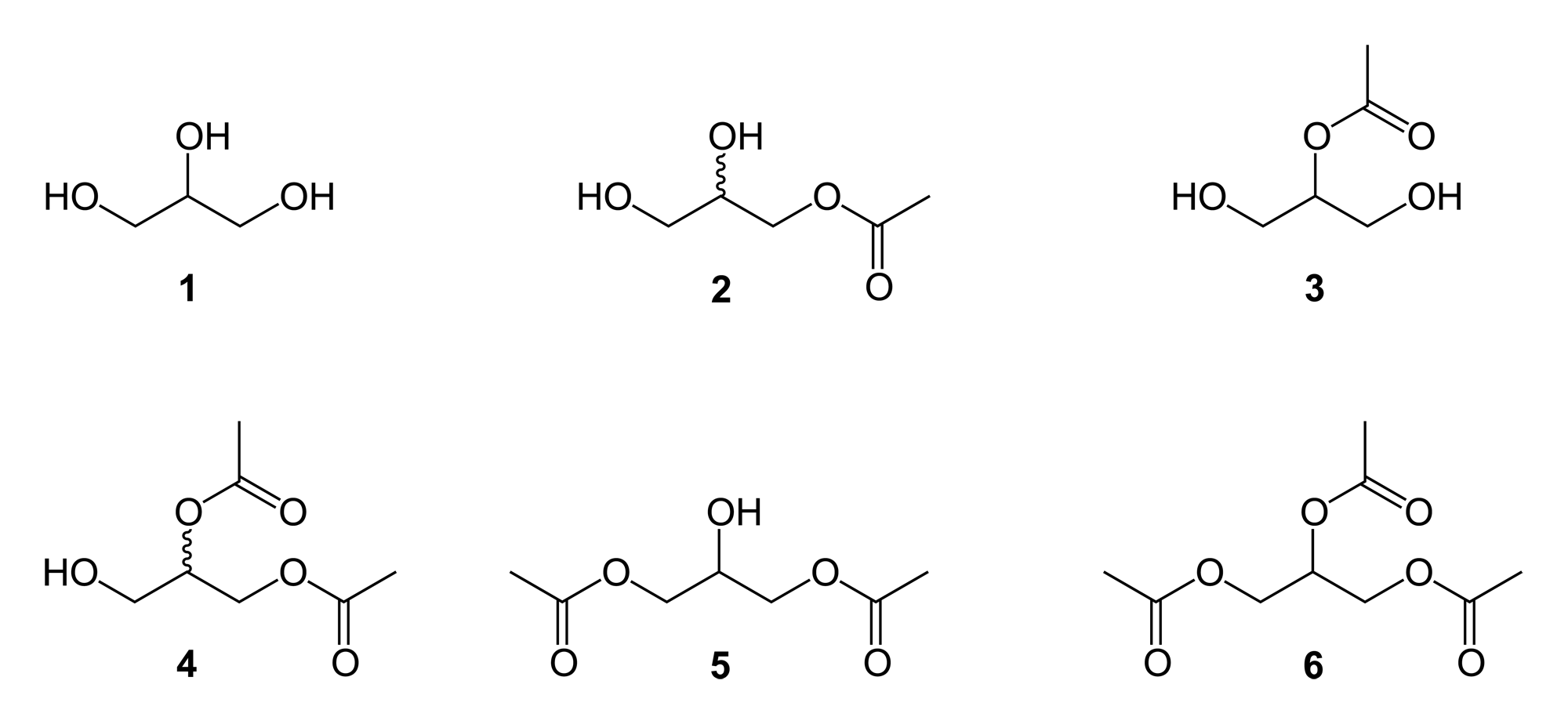
Structures of all possible acetate esters of glycerol

In addition, two of the congeners, 2 and 4, are chiral and can exist in either of two enantiomeric forms.

== Uses ==
DAG and TAG can be used as fuel additives for improving the cold and viscosity properties of biodiesel or the antiknocking properties of gasoline.
