= Fluoroacetamide =

- Skeletal formula of fluoroacetamide

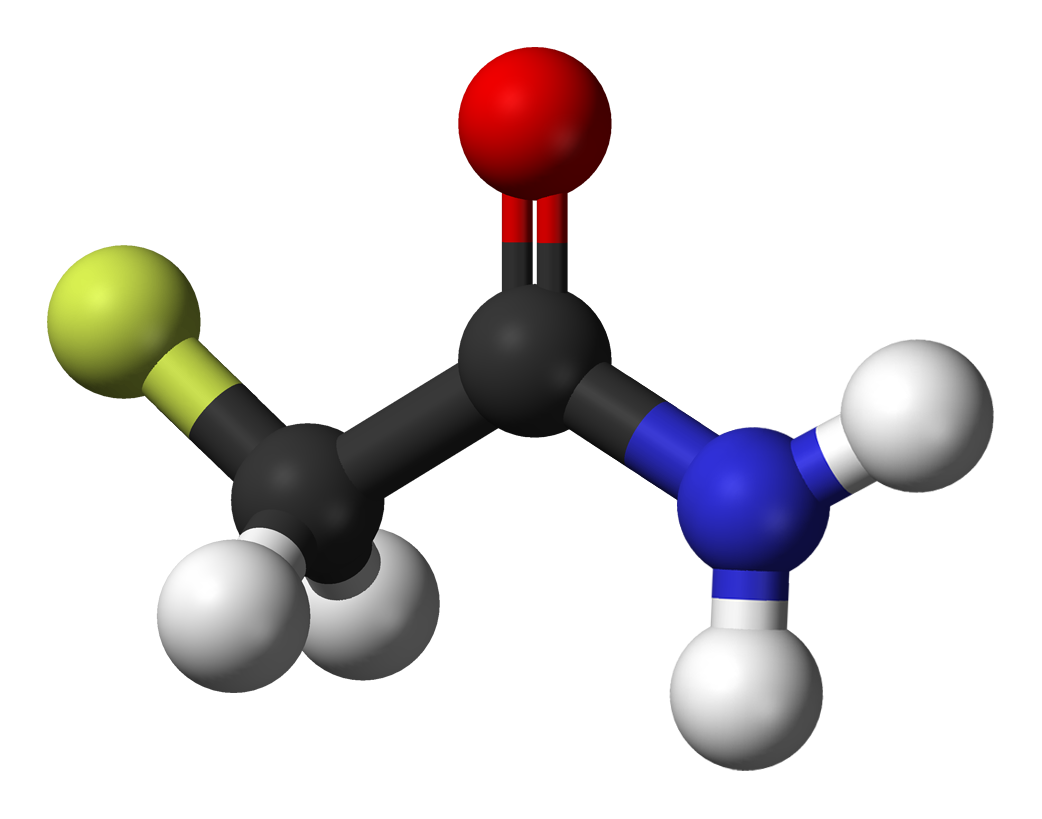
- Ball-and-stick model of fluoroacetamide

Names
- IUPAC name 2-Fluoroacetamide

Identifiers
CAS Number	640-19-7
3D model (JSmol)	Interactive image; Interactive image
ChEBI	CHEBI:53124
ChEMBL	ChEMBL160811
ChemSpider	12025
ECHA InfoCard	100.010.331
KEGG	C18675
PubChem CID	12542
UNII	B18R611M38
CompTox Dashboard (EPA)	DTXSID2034255
- InChI: InChI=1S/C2H4FNO/c3-1-2(4)5/h1H2,(H2,4,5) Key: FVTWJXMFYOXOKK-UHFFFAOYSA-N; InChI=1/C2H4FNO/c3-1-2(4)5/h1H2,(H2,4,5) Key: FVTWJXMFYOXOKK-UHFFFAOYAA
- SMILES: C(C(=O)N)F; FCC(=O)N

Properties
Chemical formula	FCH_{2}CONH_{2}
Molar mass	77.058 g·mol^{−1}
Appearance	Colorless crystals
Melting point	107 to 109 °C (225 to 228 °F; 380 to 382 K)
Solubility in water	Soluble

Hazards
- Occupational safety and health (OHS/OSH)
Main hazards	Very toxic
- GHS labelling
Pictograms	(GHS06: Toxic)
Signal word	Danger
Hazard statements	H300+H310
Precautionary statements	P262, P264, P270, P280, P301+P310+P330, P302, P350, P362, P405, P501
NFPA 704 (fire diamond)	4 1
- Lethal dose or concentration (LD, LC)
LD_{50} (median dose)	80 mg/kg (dermal, rat)
LC_{50} (median concentration)	550 mg/m^{3}(mouse, inhalation, dust/mist)
- Safety data sheet (SDS)

Related compounds
Related compounds	Chloroacetamide; Bromoacetamide; Iodoacetamide; Fluoroacetic acid; Acetamide
- Except where otherwise noted, data are given for materials in their standard state (at 25 °C [77 °F], 100 kPa). verify (what is ?) Infobox references

Fluoroacetamide is an organic compound with the chemical formula FCH_{2}CONH_{2}. It is a compound based on acetamide with one fluorine atom replacing hydrogen on the methyl group. It is a very toxic metabolic poison which disrupts the citric acid cycle and was used as a rodenticide. If consumed it can cause reproductive disorders. In addition it causes serious eye damage.

== See also ==
- Sodium fluoroacetate
