= Insecticide Resistance Action Committee =

Technical group of CropLife International

The Insecticide Resistance Action Committee (IRAC) was formed in 1984 and works as a specialist technical group of the industry association CropLife to be able to provide a coordinated industry response to prevent or delay the development of insecticide resistance in insect, mite and nematode pests. IRAC strives to facilitate communication and education on insecticide and traits resistance as well as to promote the development and facilitate the implementation of insecticide resistance management strategies.

IRAC is recognised by the Food and Agriculture Organization (FAO) and the World Health Organization (WHO) of the United Nations as an advisory body on matters pertaining to insecticide resistance.

Pesticideresistance.org is a database financed by IRAC, US Department of Agriculture, and others.

== Sponsors ==
IRAC's sponsors are: ADAMA, BASF, Bayer CropScience, Corteva, FMC, Mitsui Chemicals, Sumitomo Chemical, Syngenta and UPL.

== Mode of action classification ==
IRAC publishes an insecticide mode of action (MoA) classification that lists most common insecticides and acaricides and recommends that "successive generations of a pest should not be treated with compounds from the same MoA Group". IRAC assigns a mode of action (MoA) to an insecticide, based on sufficient scientific data. They then update the mode of action (MoA) classification. Several insecticides and classes of insecticide may act through the same mode of action.

=== Classes of insecticide ===
If an insecticide is successful, follow-on insecticides, based on the chemical structure of the first in class (prototype) insecticide, may be developed either by the original company or by competitors. Sought after are insecticides which have improved properties or which kill different orders or species of insect. The resulting classes of insecticides are named by IRAC after common usage has been established, although alternative names may be found in the scientific literature.

=== Table of modes of action and classes of insecticide ===
In the table the number of insecticides listed in each class is given, and an example of each class. The number of insecticides in the IRAC class listing as of 2024 is given in column Nr (A). The number in the Compendium of Pesticide Common Names (insecticide + acaricide) is given in column Nr (B), although the name given there to the class historically is often different to the IRAC class name.

IRAC code	Mode of action	Class	Nr (A)	Nr (B)	Example
1 A	Acetylcholinesterase (AChE) inhibitors	Carbamates	26	52	Carbofuran
1 B	Acetylcholinesterase (AChE) inhibitors	Organophosphates	66	171	Chlorpyrifos
2 A	GABA-gated chloride channel blockers	Cyclodiene organochlorines	2	17	Endosulfan
2 B	GABA-gated chloride channel blockers	Phenylpyrazoles (Fiproles)	2	7	Fipronil
3 A	Sodium channel modulators	Pyrethroids, Pyrethrins	43	84	Permethrin
3 B	Sodium channel modulators	DDT, Methoxychlor	2	20	DDT
4 A	Nicotinic acetylcholine receptor (nAChR) competitive modulators	Neonicotinoids	7	11	Imidacloprid
4 B	Nicotinic acetylcholine receptor (nAChR) competitive modulators	Nicotine	1	1	Nicotine
4 C	Nicotinic acetylcholine receptor (nAChR) competitive modulators	Sulfoximines	1	1	Sulfoxaflor
4 D	Nicotinic acetylcholine receptor (nAChR) competitive modulators	Butenolides	1	1	Flupyradifurone
4 E	Nicotinic acetylcholine receptor (nAChR) competitive modulators	Mesoionics	3	3	Triflumezopyrim
4 F	Nicotinic acetylcholine receptor (nAChR) competitive modulators	Pyridylidenes	1	1	Flupyrimin
5	Nicotinic acetylcholine receptor (nAChR) allosteric modulators - Site I	Spinosyns	2	2	Spinosad
6	Glutamate-gated chloride channel (GluCl) allosteric modulators	Avermectins, Milbemycins	4	10	Abamectin
7 A	Juvenile hormone receptor modulators	Juvenile hormone analogues	3	7	Methoprene
7 B	Juvenile hormone receptor modulators	Fenoxycarb	1	1	Fenoxycarb
7 C	Juvenile hormone receptor modulators	Pyriproxyfen	1	1	Pyriproxyfen
8 A	Miscellaneous non-specific (multi-site) inhibitors	Alkyl halides	> 3	10	1,3-dichloropropene
8 B	Miscellaneous non-specific (multi-site) inhibitors	Chloropicrin	1	1	Chloropicrin
8 C	Miscellaneous non-specific (multi-site) inhibitors	Fluorides	2	5	Sulfuryl fluoride
8 D	Miscellaneous non-specific (multi-site) inhibitors	Borates	5	2	Boric acid
8 E	Miscellaneous non-specific (multi-site) inhibitors	Tartar emetic	1	0	Tartar emetic
8 F	Miscellaneous non-specific (multi-site) inhibitors	Methyl isothiocyanate generators	3	2	Dazomet
9 B	Chordotonal organ TRPV channel modulators	pyridine azomethine derivatives	2	2	Pymetrozine
9 D	Chordotonal organ TRPV channel modulators	Pyropenes	1	1	Afidopyropen
10 A	Mite growth inhibitors affecting CHS1	Clofentezine, Diflovidazin, Hexythiazox	3	5	Clofentezine
10 B	Mite growth inhibitors affecting CHS1	Etoxazole	1	1	Etoxazole
11 A	Microbial disruptors of insect midgut membranes	Bacillus thuringiensis and the insecticidal proteins they produce	4	n.a.	n.a.
11 B	Microbial disruptors of insect midgut membranes	Bacillus sphaericus	1	n.a.	n.a.
12 A	Inhibitors of mitochondrial ATP synthase	Diafenthiuron	1	1	Diafenthiuron
12 B	Inhibitors of mitochondrial ATP synthase	Organotin miticides	3	8	Cyhexatin
12 C	Inhibitors of mitochondrial ATP synthase	Propargite	1	4	Propargite
12 D	Inhibitors of mitochondrial ATP synthase	Tetradifon	1	2	Tetradifon
13	Uncouplers of oxidative phosphorylation via disruption of the proton gradient	Pyrroles, Dinitrophenols, Sulfluramid	3	8	Chlorfenapyr
14	Nicotinic acetylcholine receptor (nAChR) channel blockers	Nereistoxin analogues	4	5	Thiocyclam
15	Inhibitors of chitin biosynthesis affecting CHS1	Benzoylureas	11	15	Lufenuron
16	Inhibitors of chitin biosynthesis, type 1	Buprofezin	1	1	Buprofezin
17	Moulting disruptor, Dipteran	Cyromazine	1	1	Cyromazine
18	Ecdysone receptor agonists	Diacylhydrazines	4	6	Tebufenozide
19	Octopamine receptor agonists	Amitraz	1	7	Amitraz
20 A	Mitochondrial complex III electron transport inhibitors – Qo site	Hydramethylnon	1	1	Hydramethylnon
20 B	Mitochondrial complex III electron transport inhibitors – Qo site	Acequinocyl	1	1	Acequinocyl
20 C	Mitochondrial complex III electron transport inhibitors – Qo site	Fluacrypyrim	1	4	Fluacrypyrim
20 D	Mitochondrial complex III electron transport inhibitors – Qo site	Bifenazate	1	1	Bifenazate
21 A	Mitochondrial complex I electron transport inhibitors	METI acaricides and insecticides	6	9	Tebufenpyrad
21 B	Mitochondrial complex I electron transport inhibitors	Rotenone	1	1	Rotenone
22 A	Voltage-dependent sodium channel blockers	Oxadiazines	1	1	Indoxacarb
22 B	Voltage-dependent sodium channel blockers	Semicarbazones	1	1	Metaflumizone
23	Inhibitors of acetyl-CoA carboxylase	Tetronic and Tetramic acid derivatives	5	6	Spirotetramat
24 A	Mitochondrial complex IV electron transport inhibitors	Phosphides	4	3	Phosphine
24 B	Mitochondrial complex IV electron transport inhibitors	Cyanides	3	3	Sodium cyanide
25 A	Mitochondrial complex II electron transport inhibitors	Beta-ketonitrile derivatives	2	6	Cyenopyrafen
25 B	Mitochondrial complex II electron transport inhibitors	Carboxanilides	1	1	Pyflubumide
28	Ryanodine receptor modulators	Diamides	5	19	Chlorantraniliprole
29	Chordotonal organ nicotinamidase inhibitors	Flonicamid	1	2	Flonicamid
30	GABA-gated chloride channel allosteric modulators	Meta-diamides, Isoxazolines	3	15	Broflanilide
31	Baculoviruses	Granuloviruses (GVs), Nucleopolyhedroviruses (NPVs)	4	n.a.	Cydia pomonella GV
32	Nicotinic Acetylcholine Receptor (nAChR) allosteric modulators - Site II	GS-omega/kappa HXTX-Hv1a peptide	1	n.a.	GS-omega/kappa HXTX-Hv1a peptide
33	Calcium‐activated potassium channel (KCa2) modulators	Acynonapyr	1	1	Acynonapyr
34	Mitochondrial complex III electron transport inhibitors – Qi site	Flometoquin	1	1	Flometoquin
35	RNA interference mediated target suppressors	Ribonucleic acids (RNA)	2	2	Ledprona
36	Chordotonal organ modulators – undefined target site	Pyridazine pyrazolecarboxamides	1	1	Dimpropyridaz
37	Vesicular acetylcholine transporter (VAChT) inhibitor	Oxazosulfyl	1	1	Oxazosulfyl
UN	Compounds of unknown or uncertain MoA	many various classes	10	83	Benzoximate
UNB	Bacterial agents (non-Bt) of unknown or uncertain MoA	class not defined	2	n.a.	Wolbachia pipientis (Zap)
UNE	Botanical essence including synthetic, extracts and unrefined oils with unknown or uncertain MoA	class not defined	5	n.a.	Neem oil
UNF	Fungal agents of unknown or uncertain MoA	class not defined	6	n.a.	Beauveria bassiana strains
UNM	Non-specific mechanical and physical disruptors	class not defined	3	n.a.	Mineral oil
UNP	Peptides of unknown or uncertain MoA	no examples	none	n.a.	no examples
UNV	Viral agents (non-baculovirus) of unknown or uncertain MoA	no examples	none	n.a.	no examples

== See also ==
- HRAC classification
- List of insecticides
