= Insect growth regulator =

Chemical insecticide

An insect growth regulator (IGR) is a chemical insecticide that kills insects indirectly by disrupting their life cycle. The term was initially proposed to describe the effects of juvenile hormone analogs. Although the term "insect growth disruptor" more accurately describes the actions of IGRs, it did not become widely used. IGRs encompass chemical classes with three modes of action (mechanisms of action): juvenile hormone analogs, chitin synthesis inhibitors, and ecdysone receptor agonists.

== Juvenile hormone analogs ==
Juvenile hormone analogs are also known as juvenile hormone mimics, juvenoids, or JH signaling activators. Juvenile hormone (JH) controls many important processes in insects including metamorphosis. After the structure determination of the JHs in the 1960s, the search for more stable and useable analogs started. Zoecon introduced methoprene in 1975, and later hydroprene and kinoprene. Later again other companies introduced the more stable fenoxycarb and pyriproxyfen. They are in IRAC group 7.

JH mimics sold for $87 million globally in 2018, which is a small proportion of the $18.4 billion insecticide market in 2018. They are used against both sap-feeding and leaf eating insects as well as for vector control.

They have low vertebrate and environmental toxicity. Methoprene and pyriproxyfen are recommended by the World Health Organization (WHO) for treating drinking water sources and containers.

Many plants produce juvenile hormone mimics (phytojuvenoids) to kill insects.

== Chitin synthesis inhibitors ==
Chitin synthesis inhibitors work by preventing the formation of chitin, an important part of the insect's exoskeleton. The main class of chitin synthesis inhibitors are the benzoyl ureas (BPUs). The first BPU, diflubenzuron, was commercialised by Phillips-Duphar in 1975. Since then, many BPUs were commercialised by many companies. BPUs accounted for 3% of the $18.4 billion world insecticide market in 2018. They are active against types of insect pests, (e.g. lepidoptera coleoptera, diptera) in agriculture, as well as being used against termites and animal health pests such as fleas. BPUs have low mammalian toxicity (diflubenzuron is approved by the WHO for treatment of drinking water as a mosquito larvicide) but they are highly toxic to water invertebrates and crustaceans. They disrupt moulting and egg hatch and act by inhibiting the enzyme chitin synthase.

Other chemical classes of insecticide, were shown to also act through inhibition of chitin synthase: buprofezin, etoxazole, clofentazine, hexythiazole, and cyromazine. They are in IRAC mode of action groups 10, 15 and 16.

== Ecdysone agonists ==
The only commercial class of ecdysone agonists are the diacylhydrazines or bisacyl hydrazines (BAHs). The first BAH to be commercialised was tebufenozide, discovered in the 1980s at Rohm & Haas, who later commercialised methoxyfenozide, and halofenozide. Later other companies commercialised chromafenozide and fufenozide. BAHs were estimated to account for around 1% of the 18.4 billion dollar 2018 global pesticide market. They produce premature unsuccessful moulting, and act by agonising the ecdysone receptor. BAHs show low mammalian and environmental toxicity. Methoxyfenozide was given a presidential green chemistry award in 1998. Both tebufenozide and methoxyfenozide were registered by the United States Environmental Protection Agency (EPA) under its Reduced Risk Pesticide Program. Many plants produce chemicals (phytoecdysteroids) which use this mode of action to kill insects.

== Others ==
Azadirachtin (AzaGuard), a natural product from the neem tree, shows antifeedant, repellent and insecticidal activity. Many different symptoms and modes of action are observed, including disruption of growth and moulting.

== Resistance ==
It was originally expected that insects would not be able to develop resistance to IGRs, but this turned out not to be the case.

== Advantages and disadvantages ==
In general IGRs show low toxicity to mammals and non-target organisms, although there are differences between the substance classes and the individual compounds. Some IGRs are labeled "reduced risk" by the EPA. IGRs are more compatible with pest management systems that use biological controls.

IGRs are slower to kill insects, show limited control of adult insects, and are in general more expensive than many other insecticides.
