= Arthropodicide =

An arthropodicide is a pesticide which acts upon arthropods. The vast majority of arthropodicides used are

- Insecticides

however there are other types. The second most common class is

- Acaricides/miticides.
