= Altemicidin =

Names
- IUPAC name (4aR,6S,7R,7aS)-4-carbamoyl-6-hydroxy-2-methyl-7-(2-sulfamoylacetamido)-2,4a,5,6,7,7a-hexahydro-1H-cyclopenta[c]pyridine-7-carboxylic acid

Identifiers
CAS Number	125399-82-8
3D model (JSmol)	Interactive image
ChemSpider	9211348
PubChem CID	11036174
UNII	39E2X82JVD
CompTox Dashboard (EPA)	DTXSID20925120
- InChI: InChI=1S/C13H20N4O7S/c1-17-3-7(11(14)20)6-2-9(18)13(12(21)22,8(6)4-17)16-10(19)5-25(15,23)24/h3,6,8-9,18H,2,4-5H2,1H3,(H2,14,20)(H,16,19)(H,21,22)(H2,15,23,24)/t6-,8+,9-,13+/m0/s1 Key: VZRFZUPFQKSXPV-VPFIQFBESA-N; InChI=1/C13H20N4O7S/c1-17-3-7(11(14)20)6-2-9(18)13(12(21)22,8(6)4-17)16-10(19)5-25(15,23)24/h3,6,8-9,18H,2,4-5H2,1H3,(H2,14,20)(H,16,19)(H,21,22)(H2,15,23,24)/t6-,8+,9-,13+/m0/s1 Key: VZRFZUPFQKSXPV-VPFIQFBEBF
- SMILES: O=S(=O)(N)CC(=O)N[C@@]2(C(=O)O)[C@@H](O)C[C@H]1C(=C/N(C[C@H]12)C)\C(=O)N

Properties
Chemical formula	C_{13}H_{20}N_{4}O_{7}S
Molar mass	376.39
- Except where otherwise noted, data are given for materials in their standard state (at 25 °C [77 °F], 100 kPa). Infobox references

Altemicidin is monoterpene alkaloid first identified in isolates from marine actinomycetes (specifically Streptomyces sioyaensis) in 1989. It may also be produced synthetically. Altemicidin displays both acaricidal and antitumor activity.
