= C12H6Cl4O2S =

The molecular formula C_{12}H_{6}Cl_{4}O_{2}S (molar mass: 356.05 g/mol, exact mass: 353.8843 u) may refer to:

- Bithionol
- Tetradifon
