= Methoprene =

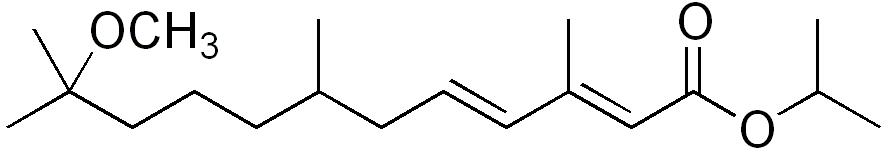
- Skeletal formula

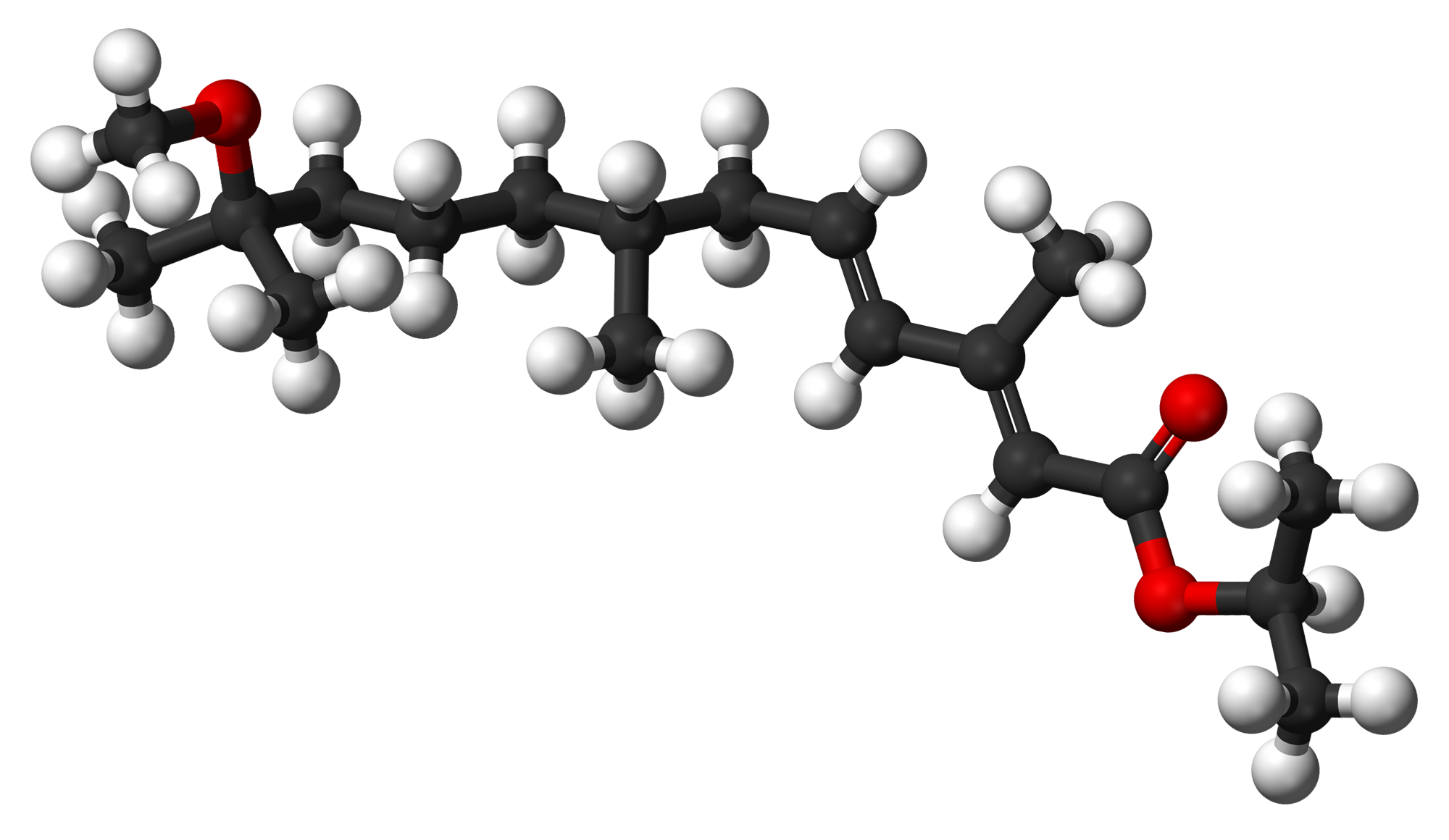
- Ball-and-stick model

Names
- Preferred IUPAC name Propan-2-yl (2E,4E)-11-methoxy-3,7,11-trimethyldodeca-2,4-dienoate
- Other names Methoprene, Altosid, Apex, Diacan, Dianex, Kabat, Minex, Omniprene G, Pharorid, Precor, ZR-515

Identifiers
CAS Number	40596-69-8
3D model (JSmol)	Interactive image
ChEBI	CHEBI:34839
ChEMBL	ChEMBL291057
ChemSpider	4518347
ECHA InfoCard	100.049.977
KEGG	C14308
MeSH	C093000
PubChem CID	5366546
UNII	8B830OJ2UX
CompTox Dashboard (EPA)	DTXSID8032627
- InChI: InChI=1S/C19H34O3/c1-15(2)22-18(20)14-17(4)11-8-10-16(3)12-9-13-19(5,6)21-7/h8,11,14-16H,9-10,12-13H2,1-7H3/b11-8+,17-14+ Key: NFGXHKASABOEEW-LDRANXPESA-N; InChI=1/C19H34O3/c1-15(2)22-18(20)14-17(4)11-8-10-16(3)12-9-13-19(5,6)21-7/h8,11,14-16H,9-10,12-13H2,1-7H3/b11-8+,17-14+ Key: NFGXHKASABOEEW-LDRANXPEBN
- SMILES: CC(C)(OC)CCCC(C)C/C=C/C(C)=C/C(OC(C)C)=O

Properties
Chemical formula	C_{19}H_{34}O_{3}
Molar mass	310.48 g/mol
Appearance	Liquid
Boiling point	100 °C (212 °F; 373 K) at 0.05 mmHg

Pharmacology
ATCvet code	QP53AX28 (WHO)

Hazards
- Occupational safety and health (OHS/OSH)
Main hazards	Eye irritant
- Except where otherwise noted, data are given for materials in their standard state (at 25 °C [77 °F], 100 kPa). verify (what is ?) Infobox references

Methoprene is a juvenile hormone (JH) analog and insect growth regulator (IGR) used widely in pest control. Classified under Insecticide Resistance Action Committee (IRAC) group 7A, methoprene is an amber-colored liquid with a faint fruity odor. Unlike conventional pesticides that kill insects through toxicity, Methoprene disrupts the development of insects, preventing them from reaching reproductive maturity.

Methoprene does not kill insects. Instead, it interferes with an insect’s life cycle and prevents it from reaching maturity or reproducing. Methoprene functions by mimicking natural juvenile hormones necessary for insect development. Insects treated with methoprene fail to transition from pupa stages to adulthood, effectively halting reproduction and the biological life cycle.

Methoprene is considered a biological pesticide because rather than controlling target pests through direct toxicity, methoprene interferes with an insect’s lifecycle and prevents it from reaching maturity or reproducing.

== Applications ==
=== Vector control ===
Methoprene is frequently employed in mosquito control programs to curb the spread of vector-borne diseases such as dengue fever, malaria. and the West Nile virus. Its larvicidal activity targets immature mosquito stages, breaking the insect's lifecycle.

=== Agriculture ===
Methoprene is applied to protect a range of food commodities such as meat, milk, mushrooms, peanuts, rice, and cereals. In cattle farming, it serves as a feed additive to prevent the breeding of flies in manure.

=== Veterinary use ===
Methoprene is a common ingredient in flea control products for domestic animals, aiding in the suppression of flea populations on pets.

== Formulations and efficacy ==
Methoprene is available in various formulations, including microencapsulated suspensions, granules, pellets, and briquets.

Against Aedes aegypti and Anopheles hermsi, one product containing methoprene maintained over 90% control for at least 49 days in 30.5 cm of water. Efficacy was further extended to 63 days in shallower water depths of 15.25 cm. For Culex quinquefasciatus, control lasted up to 56 days.

== Health and safety ==
According to its materials safety data sheet (MSDS), methoprene is a material that may be irritating to the mucous membranes and upper respiratory tract; may be harmful by inhalation, ingestion, or skin absorption; may cause eye, skin, or respiratory system irritation; and is very toxic to aquatic life. The GHS signal word is "Warning", with notes such as "P273: Avoid release into the environment" and "P391: Collect spillage".

Methoprene is suspected to be highly toxic to crustaceans like lobsters.
