= C24H32O4 =

The molecular formula C_{24}H_{32}O_{4} may refer to:

- Acequinocyl
- Estradiol butyrylacetate
- Etynodiol diacetate
- Estradiol dipropionate
- Megestrol acetate
- 16-Methylene-17α-hydroxyprogesterone acetate
- 18-Methylsegesterone acetate
- Resibufogenin
- Scillarenin
