= Tebufenpyrad =

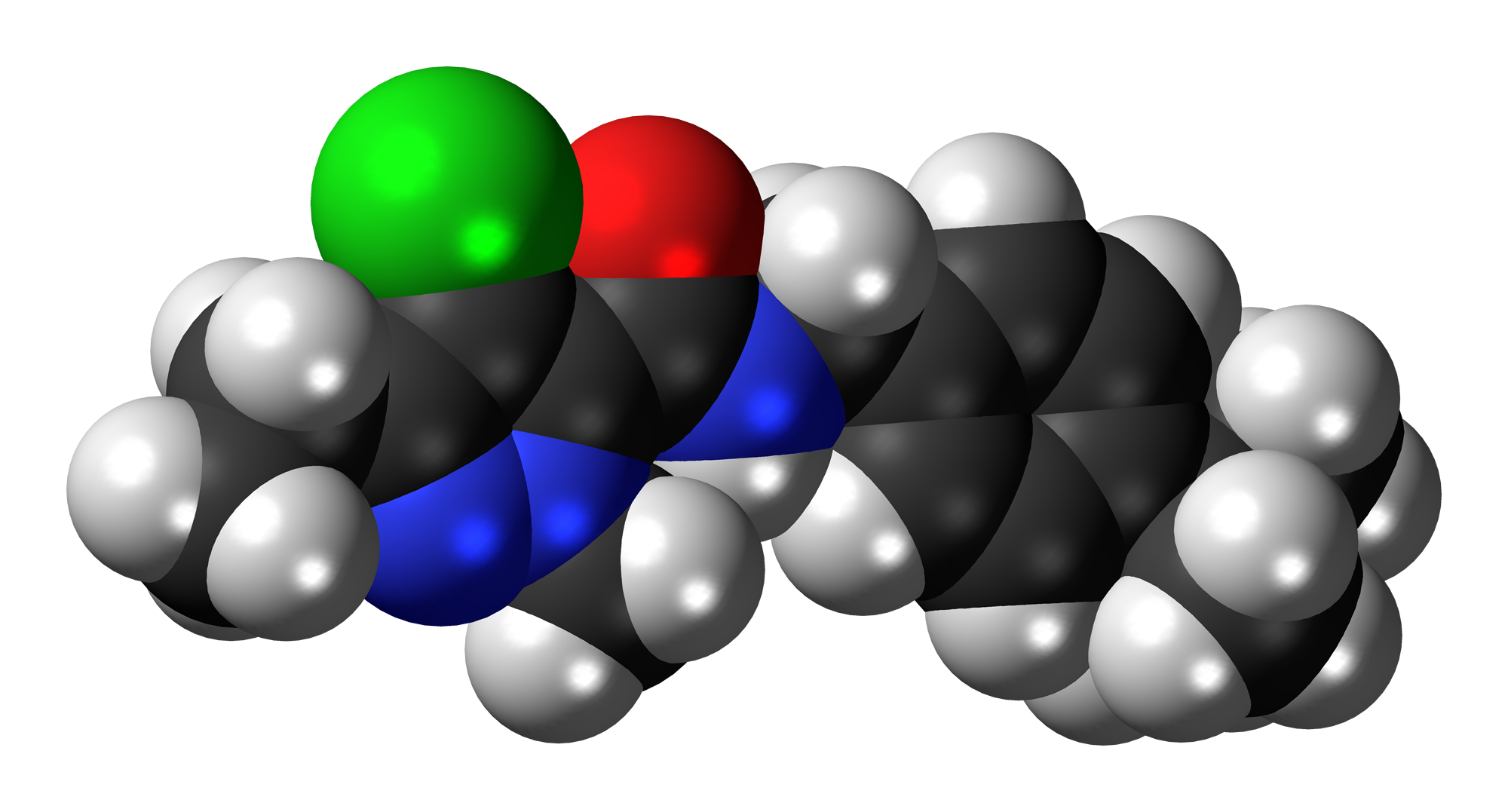

Names
- Preferred IUPAC name N-[(4-tert-Butylphenyl)methyl]-4-chloro-3-ethyl-1-methyl-1H-pyrazole-5-carboxamide
- Other names 4-Chloro-N-[[4-(1,1-dimethylethyl)phenyl]methyl]-3-ethyl-1-methyl-1H-pyrazole-5-carboxamide

Identifiers
CAS Number	119168-77-3
3D model (JSmol)	Interactive image
ChemSpider	77872
ECHA InfoCard	100.122.745
KEGG	C11126 =
PubChem CID	86354
UNII	IRU3P7ZB3F
CompTox Dashboard (EPA)	DTXSID0034223
- InChI: InChI=1S/C18H24ClN3O/c1-6-14-15(19)16(22(5)21-14)17(23)20-11-12-7-9-13(10-8-12)18(2,3)4/h7-10H,6,11H2,1-5H3,(H,20,23) Key: ZZYSLNWGKKDOML-UHFFFAOYSA-N; InChI=1/C18H24ClN3O/c1-6-14-15(19)16(22(5)21-14)17(23)20-11-12-7-9-13(10-8-12)18(2,3)4/h7-10H,6,11H2,1-5H3,(H,20,23) Key: ZZYSLNWGKKDOML-UHFFFAOYAB
- SMILES: CCc1c(c(n(n1)C)C(=O)NCc2ccc(cc2)C(C)(C)C)Cl

Properties
Chemical formula	C_{18}H_{24}ClN_{3}O
Molar mass	333.86 g·mol^{−1}
Appearance	White crystalline solid
Density	0.5 g/mL at 24.1 °C
Melting point	64 to 66 °C (147 to 151 °F; 337 to 339 K)
Solubility in water	2.61 ppm at pH 5.9; 3.21 ppm at pH 4; 2.39 ppm at pH 7; 2.32 ppm at pH 10
Acidity (pK_{a})	5.9 in water
- Except where otherwise noted, data are given for materials in their standard state (at 25 °C [77 °F], 100 kPa). verify (what is ?) Infobox references

Tebufenpyrad is an insecticide and acaricide widely used in greenhouses. It is a white solid chemical with a slight aromatic smell. It is soluble in water and also in organic solvents.

== Mode of action ==
Tebufenpyrad is a strong mitochondrial complex I inhibitor. It is one of the METI acaricides and insecticides in IRAC group 21A. Like rotenone, it inhibits electron transport chain by inhibiting the complex I enzymes of mitochondria which ultimately leads to lack of ATP production and finally cell death.

== Use ==
Tebufenpyrad is used mainly in greenhouses around the world. It has been registered under various trade names including Masai and Pyranica in countries such as Australia, China, and certain South American countries. It is registered in USA for use on ornamental plants in commercial green houses. The data available presented enough evidence to support unconditional registration of tebufenpyrad for use on ornamental plants in greenhouses.

== Exposure and toxicity ==
It is mainly used in greenhouses and the major form of exposure is through occupational exposure where this chemical is manufactured or used extensively. The possible routes of exposure are through inhalation or dermal exposure. Since it is used in ornamental plants the exposure through food is limited. The LD_{50} values for various laboratory animals are as follows:

- Rat (male, oral): 595 mg/kg
- Rat (female, oral): 997 mg/kg
- Mouse (male, oral): 224 mg/kg
- Mouse (female, oral): 210 mg/kg
- Rat (dermal): >2000 mg/kg

== Biotransformation ==
Hydroxylation is the major and primary biotransformation of tebufenpyrad reported both in vivo and in vitro. Ethyl and tert.-butyl groups are the targets of hydroxylation. The alcohol groups are oxidized to carboxylic groups which can then be conjugated with other groups in vivo. In rodent studies it was shown that 80% of the pesticide was absorbed mainly in the digestive system within 24 hours, the major metabolites being the hydroxylated forms. Most of the compound and its metabolites were excreted through feces and urine. There was no evidence of accumulation in the body of the rodents. The metabolites excreted out differed from male to female in rodents. While males excreted the carboxylic derivatives of the parent compound, the female rats excreted the sulfate conjugates of carboxylic acid. The LD_{50} values of male and female rats was very different. While the LD_{50} value of female rats was 997 mg/kg the LD_{50} for male rats was only 595 mg/kg. This vast difference in LD_{50} value might be attributed to this biotransformation.

== Consequences of exposure ==
Tebufenpyrad exposure has been linked to cancer but to date no human data has been conclusive enough to link the two. Recently this pesticide has been shown to affect the dopaminergic neuronal cell lines N27 by disrupting the mitochondrial dynamics. Loss of dopaminergic cells have been linked to Parkinson's disease in which the neuronal mitochondria are affected. These findings may show that tebufenpyrad might also be able to affect the neurons. Overexposure of the pesticide has also led to the development of resistance among different target organisms. Recent studies have detected tebufenpyrad resistance in two spider mite species in apple trees in Western Australia.
