= Flonicamid =

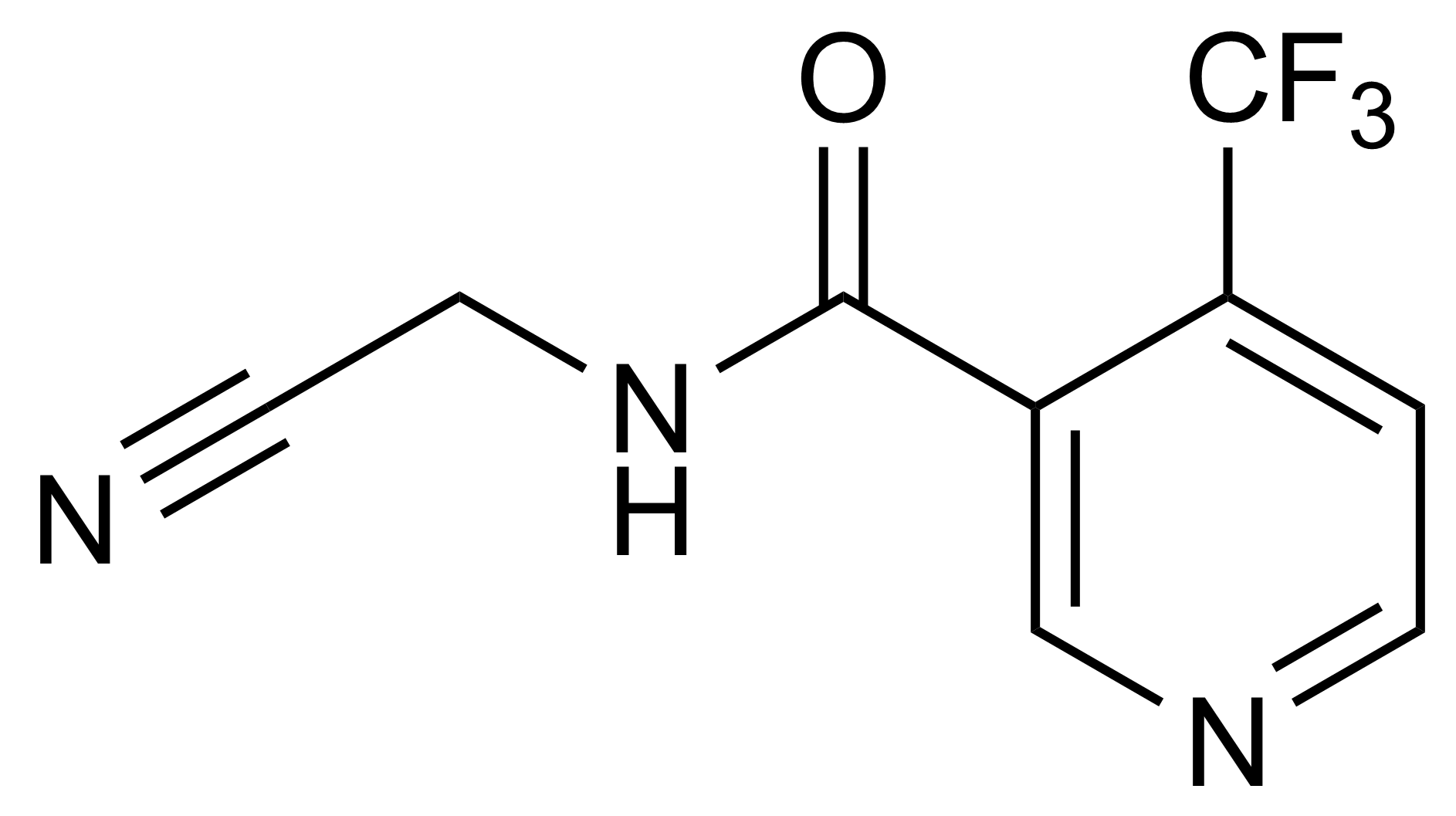

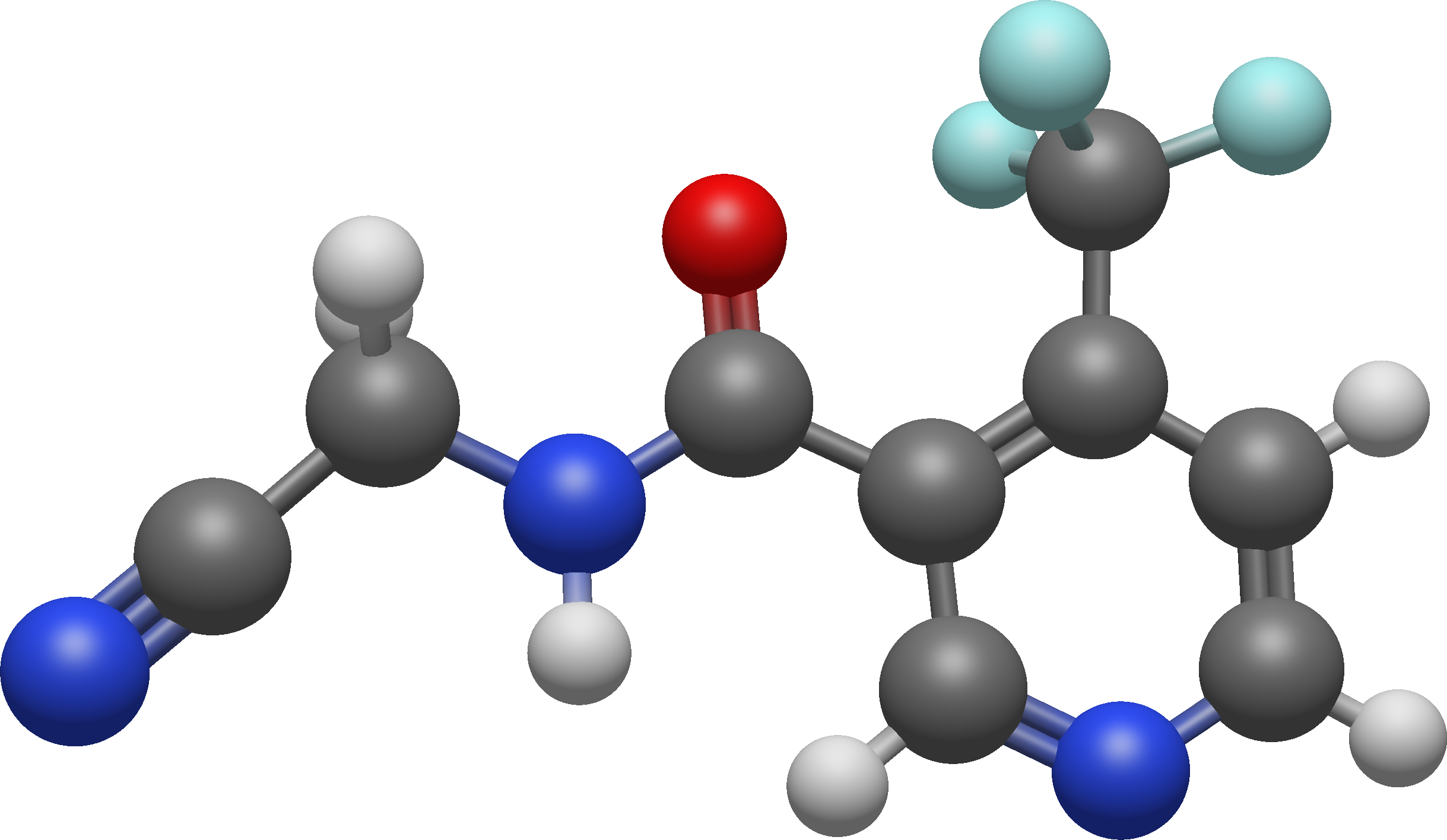

Names
- Preferred IUPAC name N-(Cyanomethyl)-4-(trifluoromethyl)pyridine-3-carboxamide

Identifiers
CAS Number	158062-67-0
3D model (JSmol)	Interactive image
ChemSpider	8010234
ECHA InfoCard	100.119.736
PubChem CID	9834513
UNII	9500W2Z53J
CompTox Dashboard (EPA)	DTXSID8034611
- InChI: InChI=1S/C9H6F3N3O/c10-9(11,12)7-1-3-14-5-6(7)8(16)15-4-2-13/h1,3,5H,4H2,(H,15,16) Key: RLQJEEJISHYWON-UHFFFAOYSA-N
- SMILES: C1=CN=CC(=C1C(F)(F)F)C(=O)NCC#N

Properties
Chemical formula	C_{9}H_{6}F_{3}N_{3}O
Molar mass	229.162 g/mol
Appearance	White crystalline powder
Odor	none
Density	1.531 at 25 °C
Melting point	157.5 °C (315.5 °F; 430.6 K)
Solubility in water	5.2 g/L at 20 °C
Acidity (pK_{a})	11.6
- Except where otherwise noted, data are given for materials in their standard state (at 25 °C [77 °F], 100 kPa). Infobox references

Flonicamid is a synthetic pyridine organic compound used as an insecticide against aphids, whiteflies, and thrips. It disrupts insect chordotonal organs that can affect hearing, balance, movement to cause cessation of feeding, by inhibiting nicotinamidase. It is in IRAC group 29. It is typically sold as wettable granules that are mixed with water before spraying.

== Regulation ==
Products containing this active ingredient have been banned in Denmark because flonicamid can degrade into trifluoroacetic acid, which can then contaminate groundwater and not decompose.
