= Tetradifon =

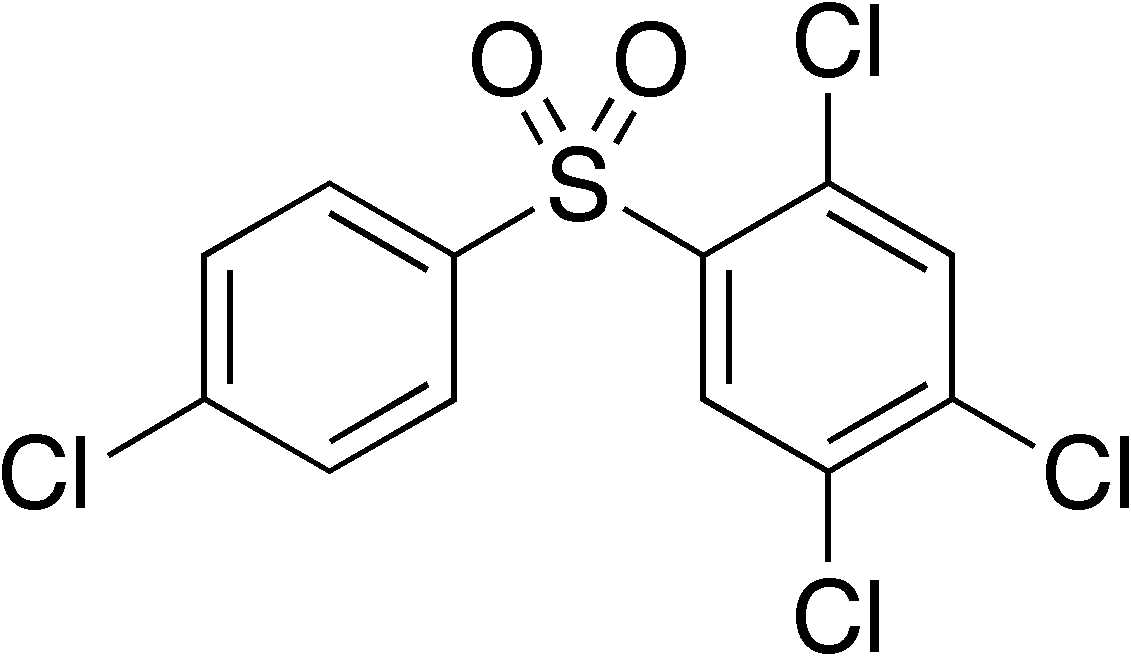

Names
- Preferred IUPAC name 1,2,4-Trichloro-5-(4-chlorobenzene-1-sulfonyl)benzene

Identifiers
CAS Number	116-29-0
3D model (JSmol)	Interactive image
ChEBI	CHEBI:39330
ChemSpider	8004
ECHA InfoCard	100.003.759
EC Number	204-134-2
KEGG	C18451
PubChem CID	8305
UNII	TIP8EA8VTS
CompTox Dashboard (EPA)	DTXSID7021316
- InChI: InChI=1S/C12H6Cl4O2S/c13-7-1-3-8(4-2-7)19(17,18)12-6-10(15)9(14)5-11(12)16/h1-6H Key: MLGCXEBRWGEOQX-UHFFFAOYSA-N; InChI=1/C12H6Cl4O2S/c13-7-1-3-8(4-2-7)19(17,18)12-6-10(15)9(14)5-11(12)16/h1-6H Key: MLGCXEBRWGEOQX-UHFFFAOYAO
- SMILES: C1=CC(=CC=C1S(=O)(=O)C2=CC(=C(C=C2Cl)Cl)Cl)Cl

Properties
Chemical formula	C_{12}H_{6}Cl_{4}O_{2}S
Molar mass	356.04 g·mol^{−1}
Density	1.515 g·cm^{−3}
- Except where otherwise noted, data are given for materials in their standard state (at 25 °C [77 °F], 100 kPa). verify (what is ?) Infobox references

Tetradifon is a miticide. It acts by inhibiting mitochondrial ATP synthase and is in IRAC group 12C.

== Synthesis and Preparation ==
Tetradifon can be prepared by reacting 1,2,4-trichlorobenzene with chlorosulfonic acid, followed by reaction with chlorobenzene, or by reacting Tetrasul with hydrogen peroxide.

== Properties ==
Tetradifon is a white, odorless, flammable, non-volatile solid. It is stable to hydrolysis in both alkaline and acidic solutions. The commercial product contains more than 94% tetradifon, with impurities including 2,4,5-trichlorophenoxyacetic acid (2,4,5-T) and polychlorinated dibenzodioxins, but not 2,3,7,8-TCDD.

== Uses ==
Tetradifon is used as an acaricide. It is toxic to mite eggs and immature mites. Its mode of action involves the inhibition of oxidative phosphorylation. It is used in horticulture, including in hobby greenhouses, primarily on fruit and vegetable crops, ornamental plants, hops, cotton, and sugarcane, as well as in forestry.

== Approval ==
Tetradifon was approved for use in West Germany from 1971 to 1985 and in East Germany until 1992. Tetradifon is not included on the list of active substances in plant protection products approved for use in the European Union. In Germany, Austria, and Switzerland, no plant protection products containing this active ingredient are approved. The European Pharmacopoeia sets the maximum permitted level of tetradifon residues in herbal drugs at 0.3 mg·kg .
