= Acynonapyr =

Identifiers
| CAS Number | 1332838-17-1 |
| ECHA InfoCard | 100.225.965 |
| PubChem CID | 132115472 |

Properties
| Chemical formula | C_{24}H_{26}F_{6}N_{2}O_{3} |
| Molar mass | 504.473 g·mol^{−1} |
- Except where otherwise noted, data are given for materials in their standard state (at 25 °C [77 °F], 100 kPa). Infobox references

Acynonapyr is a novel acaricide developed in 2017 by the Japanese company Nippon Soda Co., Ltd. under the development code NA-89. It belongs to the chemical class of pyridyloxy-azabicyclo compounds and is the first commercial agrochemical featuring an azabicyclo[3.3.1]nonane backbone.

== Mode of action ==
Acynonapyr acts as a calcium-activated potassium channel modulator (K_{Ca}2 modulator). It blocks the potassium channel in the nerve cells of spider mites, leading to neurological symptoms such as convulsions, impaired mobility, and ultimately death.

In 2021, the Insecticide Resistance Action Committee (IRAC) classified acynonapyr as a member of a new class of active ingredients (Group 33) due to its novel mechanism of action. This makes it the first agricultural active ingredient to specifically target calcium-activated potassium channels.

== Target organisms and use ==
Acynonapyr exhibits high activity against spider mites of the genera Tetranychus and Panonychus, particularly against:

- Tetranychus urticae
- Panonychus citri
- Panonychus ulmi

Its efficacy extends to all developmental stages of the mites, including eggs, larvae, nymphs, and adults. The product is primarily used in the cultivation of vegetables, tea, citrus fruits, cut flowers, almonds, pome fruits, and hops.

== Toxicology and Safety ==
Acynonapyr exhibits low toxicity to mammals. In rats, the acute oral LD_{50} is >2000 mg/kg, and the acute dermal LD_{50} is likewise >2000 mg/kg. The active ingredient is toxic to aquatic life; therefore, appropriate precautions must be taken during application. In a two-year combined chronic toxicity and carcinogenicity study in male rats, an increased incidence of mesenteric lymph node hemangiomas and thyroid follicular cell adenomas was observed. In a carcinogenicity study in male mice, an increased incidence of malignant lymphomas of the lymphohematopoietic system was observed.

== Market status ==
Acynonapyr was introduced in Japan and South Korea in 2020 under the trade name Cynazet. It is registered with the EPA in the U.S., but is not yet approved in the EU.
