= Broflanilide =

Names
- IUPAC name 3-[benzoyl(methyl)amino]-N-[2-bromo-4-(1,1,1,2,3,3,3-heptafluoropropan-2-yl)-6-(trifluoromethyl)phenyl]-2-fluorobenzamide

Identifiers
CAS Number	1207727-04-5
3D model (JSmol)	Interactive image
ChEBI	CHEBI:131598
ChemSpider	32741665
ECHA InfoCard	100.214.739
EC Number	688-148-8
KEGG	D11526
PubChem CID	53341374
UNII	5M24RC688M
CompTox Dashboard (EPA)	DTXSID50894815
- InChI: InChI=1S/C25H14BrF11N2O2/c1-39(21(41)12-6-3-2-4-7-12)17-9-5-8-14(18(17)27)20(40)38-19-15(23(29,30)31)10-13(11-16(19)26)22(28,24(32,33)34)25(35,36)37/h2-11H,1H3,(H,38,40) Key: QSLZKWPYTWEWHC-UHFFFAOYSA-N
- SMILES: CN(C1=CC=CC(=C1F)C(=O)NC2=C(C=C(C=C2Br)C(C(F)(F)F)(C(F)(F)F)F)C(F)(F)F)C(=O)C3=CC=CC=C3

Properties
Chemical formula	C_{25}H_{14}BrF_{11}N_{2}O_{2}
Molar mass	663.285 g·mol^{−1}

Hazards
- GHS labelling
Pictograms	(GHS09: Environmental hazard)
Signal word	Warning
Hazard statements	H410
Precautionary statements	P273, P391, P501
- Except where otherwise noted, data are given for materials in their standard state (at 25 °C [77 °F], 100 kPa). Infobox references

Broflanilide is a complex, polycyclic, organohalogen insecticide which provides a novel mode of action (MoA).

== Mode of action ==
Upon its discovery by Mitsui Chemicals, Insecticide Resistance Action Committee (IRAC) created the new MoA Group 30 for Broflanilide. Broflanilide is a meta-diamide GABA-gated Cl^{−} channel allosteric modulator. This - along with isoxazolines providing the same MoA, so far only fluxametamide - constitute the new MoA Group 30 in the IRAC classification scheme.

== Advantages ==
- No cross-resistance with existing MoAs.
- Shows high effectiveness against wireworms.
- Not systemic.

== Environmental Hazards ==
The EPA has stated that Broflanilide is "Likely to be Carcinogenic to Humans".

Broflanilide meets the EPA Working Definition of PFAS. Note that "EPA considers any level of PFAS to be potentially toxicologically significant".

== Products ==
Products were registered in the United States in January, 2021, and in Canada. It is being sold under the brand names Cimegra (BASF) and Teraxxa (BASF, the seed treatment form).
