= Diafenthiuron =

Organosulfur insecticide

Names
- IUPAC name 1-tert-Butyl-3-[4-phenoxy-2,6-di(propan-2-yl)phenyl]thiourea
- Other names 1-tert-Butyl-3-(2,6-diisopropyl-4-phenoxyphenyl)thiourea

Identifiers
CAS Number	80060-09-9
3D model (JSmol)	Interactive image
Beilstein Reference	8343025
ChEBI	CHEBI:39299
ChemSpider	2298854
ECHA InfoCard	100.113.249
EC Number	616-885-7
KEGG	C18781
PubChem CID	3034380
RTECS number	XN9100000
UNII	22W5MDB01G
CompTox Dashboard (EPA)	DTXSID1041845
- InChI: InChI=1S/C23H32N2OS/c1-15(2)19-13-18(26-17-11-9-8-10-12-17)14-20(16(3)4)21(19)24-22(27)25-23(5,6)7/h8-16H,1-7H3,(H2,24,25,27) Key: WOWBFOBYOAGEEA-UHFFFAOYSA-N
- SMILES: CC(C)C1=CC(=CC(=C1NC(=S)NC(C)(C)C)C(C)C)OC2=CC=CC=C2

Properties
Chemical formula	C_{23}H_{32}N_{2}OS
Molar mass	384.58 g·mol^{−1}

Hazards
- GHS labelling
Pictograms	(GHS06: Toxic) (GHS07: Exclamation mark) (GHS08: Health hazard) (GHS09: Environmental hazard)
Signal word	Danger
Hazard statements	H331, H332, H373, H410
Precautionary statements	P260, P271, P273, P304+P340, P316, P317, P319, P321, P391, P403+P233, P405, P501
- Except where otherwise noted, data are given for materials in their standard state (at 25 °C [77 °F], 100 kPa). Infobox references

Diafenthioron is a pesticide, specifically an insecticide. Diafenthiuron is sold under the brand names Derby, Diron, Pegasus, Polar and Polo.

== History ==
Diafenthiuron was introduced to the market in 1990 by a pharmaceutical company called Ciba-Geigy in Switzerland and due to rising environmental concerns it is no longer approved in Switzerland and other countries of the European Union. However, until 2001, Switzerland still produced and exported the compound to other countries where its use as an agricultural pesticide was still legal.

== Structure and reactivity ==
Diafenthiuron is an phenol ether of molecular weight 384.6 g/mole and containing two 6-carbon rings attached to an oxygen and nitrilo (tert-butylcarbamate) group substituting for a hydrogen atom at position 2. It is highly soluble in multiple organic solvents however dissolves poorly in aqueous solutions due to the hydrocarbon rich regions and oxygen atom which do not form H bonds with water molecules. Therefore, diafenthiuron contamination of underground water storages by leaching is unlikely. Its lack of water solubility (partition coefficient logPow = 5.76) and strong sorption capacity, means it has the ability to accumulate persistently in aquatic and soil systems.

It is a broad spectrum, both systemic and contact as well as stomach activity synthetic pesticide impairing mitochondrial function in target pests (phytophagous mites). Due to progressive break-down of diafenthiuron to non-toxic metabolites, it poses no significant reactivity threat in the field of ecotoxicology (Hazard class III = slightly hazardous). However, its highly reactive metabolite carbodiimide (a result of S-oxidation → either non-enzymatic (light-catalyzed), P450 monooxygenases, or by FAD monooxygenases) binds to the mitochondrial ATPase and porin, inhibiting ATP production.

== Synthesis ==
The synthesis of diafenthiuron starts with phenol reacting with 2,6-diisopropyl-4-chloroaniline, creating the intermediate product 2,6-diisopropyl-4-phenoxyaniline. 2,6-diisopropyl-4-phenoxyaniline will then undergo a reaction with thiophosgene and form N-(2,6-diisopropyl-4-phenoxyphenyl)isothiocyanate. This in turn will react with tert-butylamine and form diafenthurion.

Synthesis of Diafenthiuron

== Mechanism of action ==
Diafenthiuron is photochemically or metabolically transformed into a highly reactive metabolite, Diafenthiuron carbodiimide, which covalently and irreversibly binds to microsomal glucose-6-phosphate translocase, a part of the adenosine triphosphatase (ATPase) complex. It is the only insecticide in IRAC group 12A. The binding inhibits the function of the ATPase complex due to the modification of a single sulfhydryl/amino phosphate group of the glucose-6-phosphate translocase. Therefore, substrates such as inorganic phosphate, carbamoyl phosphate and pyrophosphate cross the microsomal membrane freely without the catalytic function of the translocase; ATP production is inhibited. Diafenthiuron carbodiimide also affects mitochondrial porins, but due to the fact that the function of these mitochondrial porins is not fully known yet, the effects of the carbodiimide on these porins is also not understood. In summary, diafenthiuron inhibits the process of mitochondrial respiration by binding to various mitochondrial components.

== Efficacy and side effects ==
Efficacy

Diafenthiuron has shown high efficacy against many important agricultural pests, including mites, aphids, thrips, and whiteflies. Several studies have demonstrated the efficacy of diafenthiuron in controlling various pests affecting a variety of crops. For example, diafenthiuron has shown to be effective against cotton bollworm, cotton jassid, and spider mites. With citrus fruits, it has been shown to control citrus rust mites and aphids. With grapes, diafenthiuron has shown to be effective against grape leafhoppers and mites. The efficacy of diafenthiuron is dependent on several factors; the target pest species, the stage of the pest's life cycle, and environmental conditions such as temperature and humidity. Next to that, the repeated use of diafenthiuron can lead to the development of resistance in target pests, reducing the efficacy of the insecticide over time.

Side effects

Apart from enzymatic conversion, diafenthiuron readily dissolves in organic solvents or is broken down by sunlight into two major by-products; diafenthiuron carbodiimide and diafenthiuron urea. In aqueous systems, the carbodiimide was further observed to be photo-transformed into diafenthiuron urea in the presence of sunlight; a key photolysis pathway in diafenthiuron breakdown in the environment.

Due to aerial application of the pesticide, its entering into fresh water bodies has observable effects on non-target organisms. Sub lethal doses (0.0075 mg/L) in both short and long term application had significant adverse effects on serum, hematological and elemental concentrations of fish which suggests that the use of diafenthiuron as a pesticide threatens the stability of aquatic food webs. The second metabolite, urea, puts an additional strain on aquatic systems.

Rapid photodegradation of diafenthiuron and its metabolites in water and soil suggests limited accumulation capacity, despite the bioaccumulation potential of ~800. However, a pond mesocosm study did not exhibit such effects in vivo, possibly due to the rapid time period needed for degradation of 50% of the product (DT50) being <22 hours. This considerably decreases the time frame of possible exposure and therefore reduces inducible toxicity by diafenthiuron metabolism.

Toxicology assessments and evaluations of dietary intake residues suggest that there are no adverse effects on human health due to exposure to agricultural residues of diafenthiuron application.

== Toxicity data ==
Toxicity data
Measurement	Method of administration	LD50
1 Acute toxicity data	inhalation (rat)	558 mg/m^{3}
2 Acute toxicity data	oral (duck)	>1500 mg/kg
3 Acute toxicity data	oral (quail)	>1500 mg/kg
4 Acute toxicity data	oral (rat)	2068 mg/kg
5 Acute toxicity data	skin (rat)	>2 gm/kg
6 Other multiple dose data	oral (dog)	lowest published dose: 360 mg/kg/90D continuous

== Effects on animals ==
When animals are exposed to diafenthiuron, both acute and chronic effects can occur. Different animal species can have different sensitivity to diafenthiuron depending on factors like size, metabolism, and exposure pathway. However, in general, aquatic organisms and bees suffer most from diafenthiuron exposure.

Aquatic life

Diafenthiuron can have adverse effects on aquatic life when it enters water bodies through runoff or spray drift. The effects depend on the concentration and duration of exposure, as well as the sensitivity of the aquatic species. Some potential effects of diafenthiuron include:

1. Acute toxicity: diafenthiuron can be highly toxic, especially to invertebrates such as crustaceans and insects. Exposure to high concentrations of diafenthiuron can cause rapid death in these organisms.
2. Chronic toxicity: prolonged exposure to lower concentrations of diafenthiuron can lead to chronic effects. These effects can include reduced growth and reproduction, as well as changes in behavior and physiology.

Bees

Bees can be exposed to diafenthiuron through the consumption of contaminated nectar and pollen. This can have adverse effects on health and survival. The effects of diafenthiuron on bees can include:

1. Reduced foraging activity: exposure to diafenthiuron can cause behavioural changes in bees, reducing their foraging activity and impairing their ability to locate and collect food.
2. Reduced reproduction: exposure to diafenthiuron can reduce reproductive success, including the production of eggs and the survival chances of larvae.
3. Mortality: high levels of exposure to diafenthiuron can cause rapid mortality, especially in young or weak individuals.
