= Prototype drug =

Initial drug used as a reference

In pharmacology and pharmaceutics, a prototype drug is an individual drug that represents a drug class – group of medications having similar chemical structures, mechanism of action and mode of action. Prototypes are the most important, and typically the first developed drugs within the class, and are used as a reference to which all other drugs are compared.

== Examples ==
- Morphine is the prototype of opioid analgesics
- Propranolol is the prototype of the beta blockers
- Chlorpromazine is the prototypical phenothiazine antipsychotic
- Imipramine is the prototypical tricyclic antidepressant, and itself a derivative of chlorpromazine
- Diazepam is the prototype of the benzodiazepine
- Diphenhydramine (Benadryl) is the prototype ethanolamine antihistamine
- Nifedipine is the prototype dihydropyridine calcium channel blocker
- Chloroquine is the prototypical antimalarial agent
- Acyclovir is the prototype antiviral agent that is activated by viral thymidine kinase
- Aspirin is the prototype NSAID
- Dextroamphetamine is the prototype Stimulant
- Omeprazole is the prototype Proton-pump inhibitor
