= Hydroprene =

Names
- Preferred IUPAC name Ethyl (2E,4E)-3,7,11-Trimethyldodeca-2,4-dienoate

Identifiers
CAS Number	41096-46-2
3D model (JSmol)	Interactive image
ChemSpider	4522732
PubChem CID	5372477
UNII	3SS174B1Y9
CompTox Dashboard (EPA)	DTXSID9042049
- InChI: InChI=1S/C17H30O2/c1-6-19-17(18)13-16(5)12-8-11-15(4)10-7-9-14(2)3/h8,12-15H,6-7,9-11H2,1-5H3/b12-8+,16-13+ Key: FYQGBXGJFWXIPP-UEVLXMDPSA-N; InChI=1/C17H30O2/c1-6-19-17(18)13-16(5)12-8-11-15(4)10-7-9-14(2)3/h8,12-15H,6-7,9-11H2,1-5H3/b12-8+,16-13+ Key: FYQGBXGJFWXIPP-UEVLXMDPBN
- SMILES: O=C(OCC)\C=C(\C=C\CC(C)CCCC(C)C)C

Properties
Chemical formula	C_{17}H_{30}O_{2}
Molar mass	266.425 g·mol^{−1}

Related compounds
Related compounds	triprene, kinoprene
- Except where otherwise noted, data are given for materials in their standard state (at 25 °C [77 °F], 100 kPa). Infobox references

Hydroprene is an insect growth regulator used as an insecticide. It is used against cockroaches, beetles, and moths. Products using hydroprene include Gencor, Gentrol, and Raid Max Sterilizer Discs. Hydroprene is a synthetic juvenile hormone mimic, disrupting insect larval development such as molting.
