= Triprene =

Defunct insecticide

Names
- IUPAC name S-Ethyl (E,E)-(7R/S)-11-methoxy-3,7,11-trimethyldodeca-2,4-dienethioate
- Other names ZR 619, Altorick, Altoric, ZR 519 (suspected typo)

Identifiers
CAS Number	40596-80-3
3D model (JSmol)	Interactive image
ChEMBL	ChEMBL36831
ChemSpider	4944101
PubChem CID	6439708
UNII	888S6M89C1
CompTox Dashboard (EPA)	DTXSID3042502
- InChI: InChI=1S/C18H32O2S/c1-7-21-17(19)14-16(3)11-8-10-15(2)12-9-13-18(4,5)20-6/h8,11,14-15H,7,9-10,12-13H2,1-6H3/b11-8+,16-14+ Key: YGBMMMOLNODPBP-GWGZPXPZNA-N
- SMILES: C(CCCC(C/C=C/C(=C/C(SCC)=O)/C)C)(OC)(C)C

Properties
Chemical formula	C_{18}H_{32}O_{2}S
Molar mass	312.51 g·mol^{−1}
Appearance	Amber liquid
Density	800-1000 kg/m^{3} (Predicted)

Hazards
Flash point	179-201 °C (Predicted)
- Lethal dose or concentration (LD, LC)
LD_{50} (median dose)	>10,000 mg/kg (oral, rat); >9,000 mg/kg (skin, rabbit)

Related compounds
Related compounds	hydroprene, kinoprene
- Except where otherwise noted, data are given for materials in their standard state (at 25 °C [77 °F], 100 kPa). Infobox references

Triprene is an insecticide that is no longer in use. It is an insect growth regulator introduced by Zoecon Corporation (now Sandoz AG) under the "Altorick" trademark, registered 1974 and not renewed, expiring in 1980. The EPA records no registration, now or past.

Triprene is nontoxic to mammals, non-carcinogenic, not a human endocrine disruptor, and not neurotoxic. To fish, it may be of moderate toxicity.

Triprene is a juvenile hormone mimic. It disrupts insects' development by endocrine disruption, causing incomplete pupation and sterile adult insects.

== Effectiveness ==
Triprene was tested against the similar kinoprene and hydroprene. Kinoprene was the most effective against long tailed mealybug and solanum mealybug, hydroprene and triprene both needing multiple applications. All controlled coffee brown scale.
