= Buprofezin =

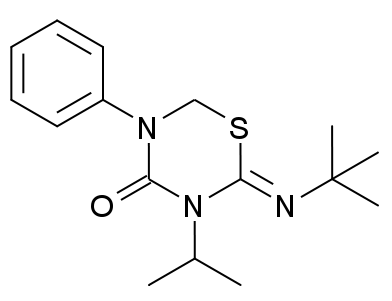

Names
- IUPAC name (2Z)-3-Isopropyl-2-[(2-methyl-2-propanyl)imino]-5-phenyl-1,3,5-thiadiazinan-4-one
- Other names Buprofezin

Identifiers
CAS Number	69327-76-0
3D model (JSmol)	Interactive image
Beilstein Reference	8625926
ChEBI	CHEBI:39381
ChEMBL	ChEMBL1891512
ChemSpider	45678
ECHA InfoCard	100.125.182
EC Number	614-948-3
KEGG	C10912
PubChem CID	50367
UNII	3B8KGI239I
CompTox Dashboard (EPA)	DTXSID8034401
- InChI: InChI=1S/C16H23N3OS/c1-12(2)19-14(17-16(3,4)5)21-11-18(15(19)20)13-9-7-6-8-10-13/h6-10,12H,11H2,1-5H3/b17-14- Key: PRLVTUNWOQKEAI-VKAVYKQESA-N
- SMILES: CC(C)N1\C(=N\C(C)(C)C)\SCN(C1=O)c2ccccc2

Properties
Chemical formula	C_{16}H_{23}N_{3}OS
Molar mass	305.44 g·mol^{−1}

Hazards
- GHS labelling
Pictograms	(GHS08: Health hazard) (GHS09: Environmental hazard)
Signal word	Warning
Hazard statements	H373, H410
Precautionary statements	P260, P273, P314, P391, P501
- Except where otherwise noted, data are given for materials in their standard state (at 25 °C [77 °F], 100 kPa). Infobox references

Buprofezin is an insecticide used for control of insect pests such as mealybugs, leafhoppers and whitefly on vegetable crops. It is a growth regulator, acting as an inhibitor of chitin synthase (IRAC group 16). It is banned in some countries due to its negative environmental impacts, being especially toxic to aquatic organisms as well as non-target insects, though is of low toxicity to humans and other mammals.
