= Propargite =

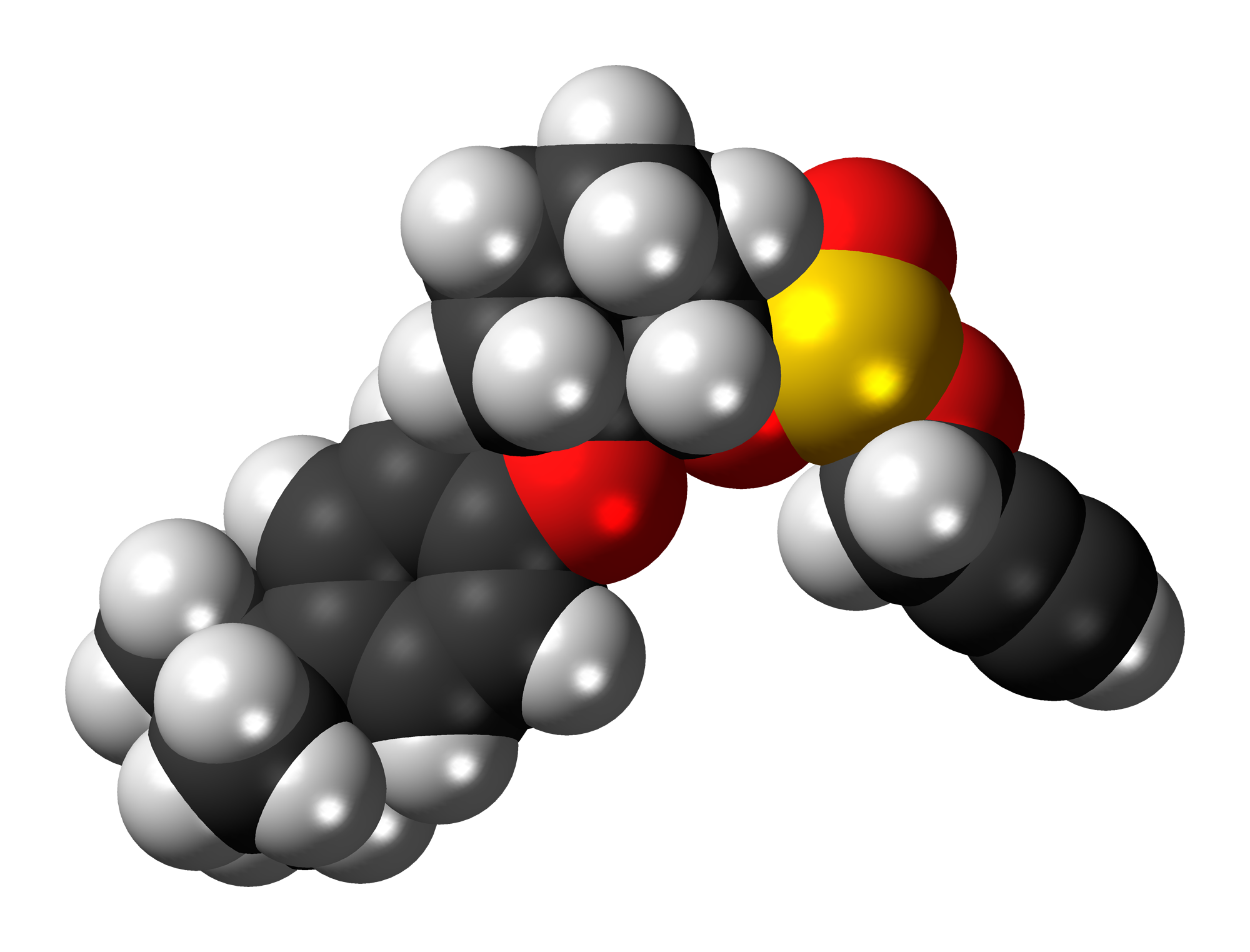

Names
- IUPAC name 2-(4-tert-butylphenoxy)cyclohexyl prop-2-yne-1-sulfonate
- Other names Omite, Comite, Uniroyal D014

Identifiers
CAS Number	2312-35-8
3D model (JSmol)	Interactive image
ChEMBL	ChEMBL1416084
ChemSpider	4767
ECHA InfoCard	100.017.279
KEGG	C18602
PubChem CID	4936
UNII	30M429ANKL
CompTox Dashboard (EPA)	DTXSID4024276
- InChI: InChI=1S/C19H26O4S/c1-5-14-21-24(20)23-18-9-7-6-8-17(18)22-16-12-10-15(11-13-16)19(2,3)4/h1,10-13,17-18H,6-9,14H2,2-4H3
- SMILES: O=S(OCC#C)OC2CCCCC2Oc1ccc(cc1)C(C)(C)C

Properties
Chemical formula	C_{19}H_{26}O_{4}S
Molar mass	350.47 g·mol^{−1}
Appearance	dark amber viscous liquid
Density	1.10 g/cm^{3}
Solubility in water	0.5 ppm
Solubility	miscible in organic solvents

Hazards
Safety data sheet (SDS)	Cornell University
- Except where otherwise noted, data are given for materials in their standard state (at 25 °C [77 °F], 100 kPa). Infobox references

Propargite (IUPAC name 2-(4-tert-butylphenoxy)cyclohexyl prop-2-yne-1-sulfonate, trade names Mitex, Omite and Comite) is a pesticide used to kill mites (an acaricide). It acts through inhibition of mitochondrial ATP synthase, and is in IRAC group 12C. Symptoms of excessive exposure are eye and skin irritation, and possibly sensitization. It is highly toxic to amphibians, fish, and zooplankton, as well as having potential carcinogenity.
