= Etoxazole =

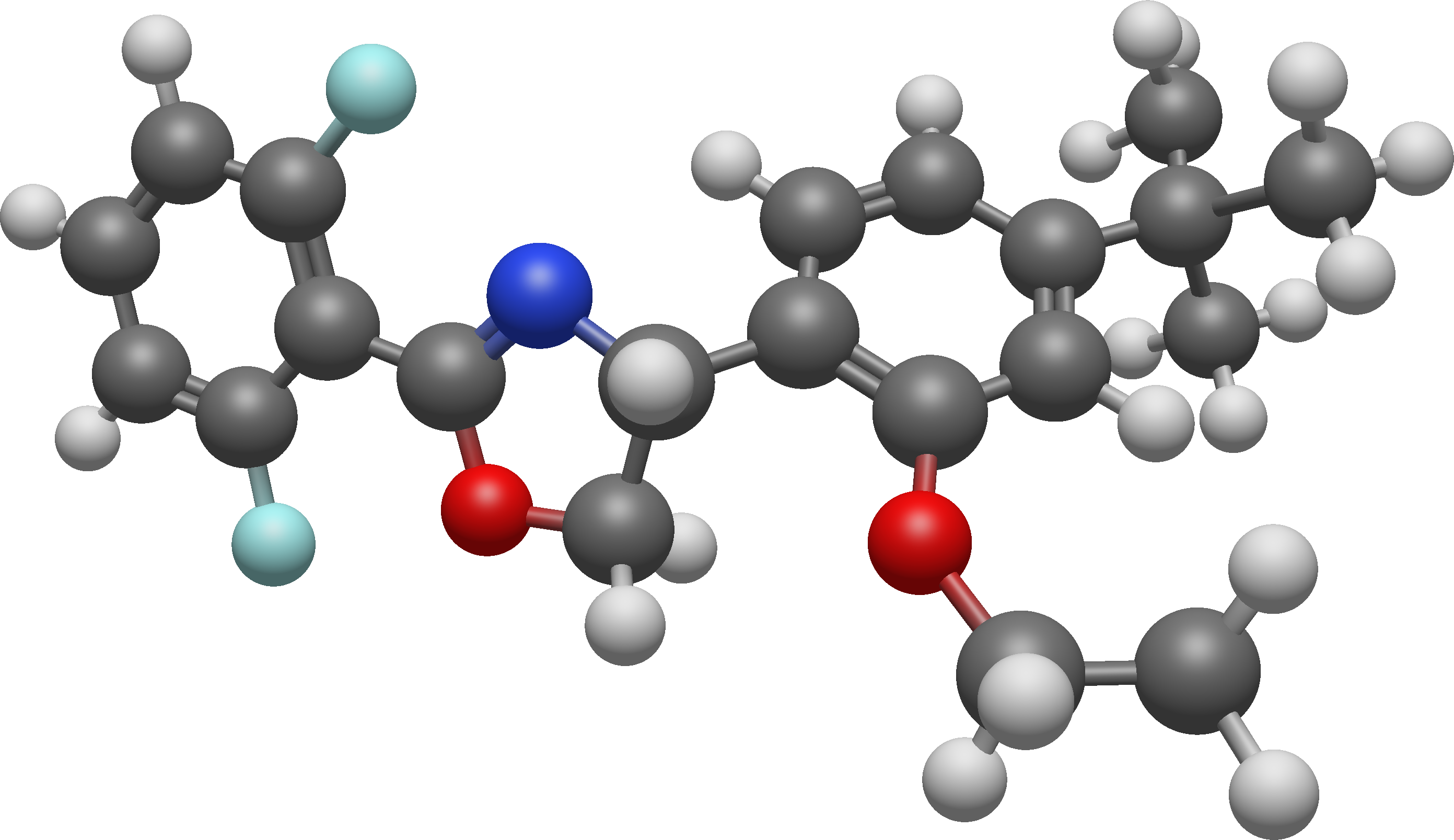

Names
- IUPAC name 2-(2,6-Difluorophenyl)-4-[2-ethoxy-4-(2-methyl-2-propanyl)phenyl]-4,5-dihydro-1,3-oxazole
- Other names (R,S)-5-tert-butyl-2-[2,6-difluorophenyl)-4,5-dihydro-1,3-oxazol-4-yl]phenetole

Identifiers
| CAS Number | 153233-91-1 |
| 3D model (JSmol) | Interactive image |
| Beilstein Reference | 8930214 |
| ChEBI | CHEBI:39329 |
| ChEMBL | ChEMBL1881674 |
| ChemSpider | 135707 |
| ECHA InfoCard | 100.107.983 |
| EC Number | 604-891-2 |
| KEGG | C18495 |
| PubChem CID | 153974 |
| UNII | LBE5H21G6L |
| CompTox Dashboard (EPA) | DTXSID8034586 |
- InChI: InChI=1S/C21H23F2NO2/c1-5-25-18-11-13(21(2,3)4)9-10-14(18)17-12-26-20(24-17)19-15(22)7-6-8-16(19)23/h6-11,17H,5,12H2,1-4H3 Key: IXSZQYVWNJNRAL-UHFFFAOYSA-N
- SMILES: CCOc1cc(ccc1C2COC(=N2)c3c(cccc3F)F)C(C)(C)C

Properties
| Chemical formula | C_{21}H_{23}F_{2}NO_{2} |
| Molar mass | 359.417 g·mol^{−1} |
| Appearance | colorless crystalline powder with a musty odor |
| Density | 1.238 |
| Melting point | 101.5–102.5°C |
| Solubility in water | insoluble in H_{2}O, slightly soluble in hexane, n-heptane, soluble in MeOH, EtOH, acetone, cyclohexanone, THF, MeCN, EtOAc, xylene. |
| log P | K_{ow} 5.59 |
| Vapor pressure | 7 mPa @ 25°C |

Hazards
- GHS labelling
| Pictograms | (GHS09: Environmental hazard) |
| Signal word | Warning |
| Hazard statements | H410 |
| Precautionary statements | P273, P391, P501 |
- Except where otherwise noted, data are given for materials in their standard state (at 25 °C [77 °F], 100 kPa). Infobox references

Etoxazole is a narrow spectrum systemic acaricide used to combat spider mites. It targets a variety of mites in the egg, larvae and nymph stages however not the adult stage. It also exhibits insecticidal activity towards aphids, the green rice leafhopper and diamondback moth. The mode of action has been shown to inhibit chitin synthase (IRAC group 10B). Resistance due to its high efficacy and cross resistance when used with other acaricides are both of concern similar to was seen in the fast development of cross resistance in the previous generation of acaricides. The LC_{50} for resistant mite strains has been observed over 100,000 times greater than that of susceptible strains. Thus resistance management strategies are important in order to limit the increase of etoxazole resistant mite strains.

Etoxazole has a mammalian toxicity LD_{50} of 5 g/kg and an environmental persistence DT_{50} of 19 days. Toxicity towards fish is of potential concern.

Etoxazole was discovered in the 1980s by Yashima and was released for commercial use in 1998 in Japan. It is sold under various commercial preparations for crop application such as TetraSan 5 WDG and Zeal by Valent in the United States.

== Stereoisomerism ==
Etoxazole (2 stereoisomers)
| (S)-configuration | (R)-configuration |
