= Tetrasul =

Names
- IUPAC name 1,2,4-trichloro-5-(4-chlorophenyl)sulfanylbenzene

Identifiers
CAS Number	2227-13-6
3D model (JSmol)	Interactive image
ChEBI	CHEBI:82162
ChEMBL	ChEMBL1365576
ChemSpider	15822
DrugBank	DB12838
ECHA InfoCard	100.017.057
EC Number	218-761-4
KEGG	C19032
PubChem CID	16685
UNII	BEO7JP5U0R
CompTox Dashboard (EPA)	DTXSID5020314
- InChI: InChI=1S/C12H6Cl4S/c13-7-1-3-8(4-2-7)17-12-6-10(15)9(14)5-11(12)16/h1-6H Key: QUWSDLYBOVGOCW-UHFFFAOYSA-N
- SMILES: C1=CC(=CC=C1SC2=CC(=C(C=C2Cl)Cl)Cl)Cl

Properties
Chemical formula	C_{12}H_{6}Cl_{4}S
Molar mass	324.04 g·mol^{−1}
Appearance	white
Melting point	88.4 °C (191.1 °F; 361.5 K)
Boiling point	200 °C (392 °F; 473 K) (1.29 hPa)
Solubility in water	practically insoluble
log P	6.9

Hazards
- GHS labelling
Pictograms	(GHS07: Exclamation mark)
Signal word	Warning
Hazard statements	H312, H412
Precautionary statements	P273, P280, P302+P352, P317, P321, P362+P364, P501
- Lethal dose or concentration (LD, LC)
LD_{50} (median dose)	3960 mg/kg (rat, oral); 2000 mg/kg (rabbit, dermal)
LC_{50} (median concentration)	11 mg/L (fish, 96 hours)
- Except where otherwise noted, data are given for materials in their standard state (at 25 °C [77 °F], 100 kPa). Infobox references

Tetrasul is an organic compound belonging to the groups of thioethers and biphenyls used historically as an acaricide to kill mites and ticks on crops. Because of its high potential for environmental bioaccumulation and toxicity, it has been banned in Europe since 2003.

== Synthesis ==
Tetrasul can be synthesized by etherifying 2,4,5-trichlorothiophenol with p-chloronitrobenzene in the presence of sodium hydroxide via a Williamson ether synthesis. The resulting product is then reduced with iron, followed by reaction with nitrous acid and copper(I) chloride in a Sandmeyer reaction.

Synthesis of Tetrasul

== Uses ==
Tetrasul was used as an acaricide on cucumbers and tomatoes.

== Approval ==
In the European Union, Tetrasul was not included in Annex I to Directive 91/414/EEC, pursuant to Regulation (EC) No. 2076/2002 of November 20, 2002. Consequently, plant protection products containing Tetrasul may not be authorized in EU member states.

In Germany, Austria, and Switzerland, no plant protection products containing this active ingredient are authorized.
