= Fenoxycarb =

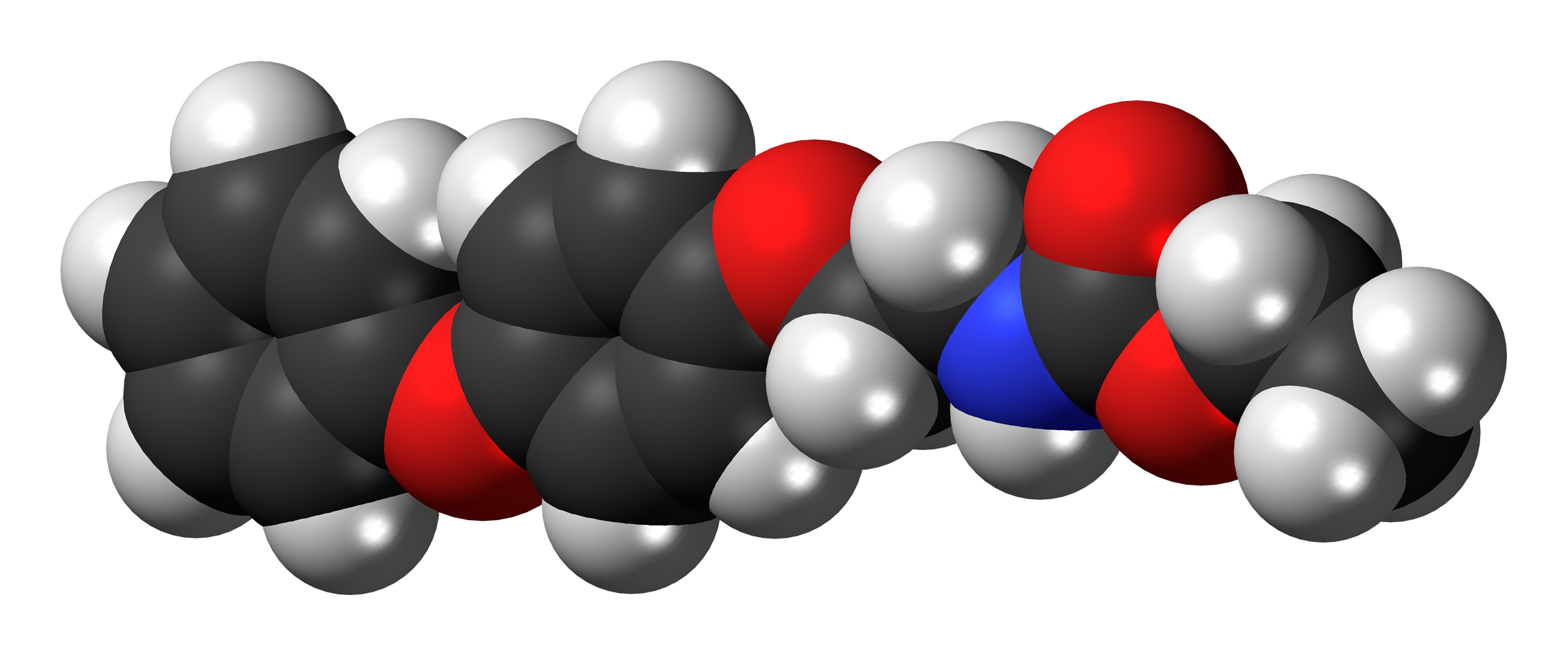

Names
- Preferred IUPAC name Ethyl [2-(4-phenoxyphenoxy)ethyl]carbamate
- Other names Varikill, Insegar, Logic

Identifiers
CAS Number	72490-01-8
3D model (JSmol)	Interactive image
ChEBI	CHEBI:5009
ChEMBL	ChEMBL15780
ChemSpider	46739
ECHA InfoCard	100.069.702
KEGG	C11078
PubChem CID	51605
UNII	JEN0LSV1G9
CompTox Dashboard (EPA)	DTXSID7032393
- InChI: InChI=1S/C17H19NO4/c1-2-20-17(19)18-12-13-21-14-8-10-16(11-9-14)22-15-6-4-3-5-7-15/h3-11H,2,12-13H2,1H3,(H,18,19) Key: HJUFTIJOISQSKQ-UHFFFAOYSA-N; InChI=1/C17H19NO4/c1-2-20-17(19)18-12-13-21-14-8-10-16(11-9-14)22-15-6-4-3-5-7-15/h3-11H,2,12-13H2,1H3,(H,18,19) Key: HJUFTIJOISQSKQ-UHFFFAOYAM"
- SMILES: O=C(OCC)NCCOc2ccc(Oc1ccccc1)cc2

Properties
Chemical formula	C_{17}H_{19}NO_{4}
Molar mass	301.34 g/mol
Melting point	53.5 °C (128.3 °F; 326.6 K)
- Except where otherwise noted, data are given for materials in their standard state (at 25 °C [77 °F], 100 kPa). verify (what is ?) Infobox references

Fenoxycarb is an insect growth regulator. It has a low toxicity for bees, birds, and humans, but is toxic to fish. The oral LD_{50} for rats is greater than 16,800 milligrams per kilogram (0.269 oz/lb).

Fenoxycarb is non-neurotoxic and does not have the same mode of action as other carbamate insecticides. Instead, it prevents immature insects from reaching maturity by mimicking juvenile hormone (IRAC group 7B).
