= Dazomet =

Names
- Preferred IUPAC name 3,5-Dimethyl-1,3,5-thiadiazinane-2-thione
- Other names Mylon; Basamid, Thiazone; Mylone; Tiazon; DMTT; Dimethylformocarbothialdine; Carbothialdin; Basamide; Nefusan; Prezervit

Identifiers
| CAS Number | 533-74-4 |
| 3D model (JSmol) | Interactive image |
| ChEBI | CHEBI:75212 |
| ChEMBL | ChEMBL1407826 |
| ChemSpider | 10332 |
| ECHA InfoCard | 100.007.798 |
| EC Number | 208-576-7 |
| KEGG | C18457 |
| PubChem CID | 10788 |
| UNII | S7419CG4W5 |
| UN number | 3077 (DAZOMET) 2588 |
| CompTox Dashboard (EPA) | DTXSID7024902 |
- InChI: InChI=1S/C5H10N2S2/c1-6-3-7(2)5(8)9-4-6/h3-4H2,1-2H3 Key: QAYICIQNSGETAS-UHFFFAOYSA-N
- SMILES: CN1CN(C(=S)SC1)C

Properties
| Chemical formula | C_{5}H_{10}N_{2}S_{2} |
| Molar mass | 162.27 g·mol^{−1} |
| Appearance | White solid |
| Density | 1.29±0.1 g/mL |
| Melting point | 104 to 105 °C (219 to 221 °F; 377 to 378 K) |
| Boiling point | 222.3±50.0 °C (predicted) |

Hazards
- GHS labelling
| Pictograms | (GHS07: Exclamation mark) (GHS09: Environmental hazard) |
| Signal word | Warning |
| Hazard statements | H302, H319, H410 |
| Precautionary statements | P264, P264+P265, P270, P273, P280, P301+P317, P305+P351+P338, P330, P337+P317, P391, P501 |
| Flash point | 156 °C (313 °F) |
- Except where otherwise noted, data are given for materials in their standard state (at 25 °C [77 °F], 100 kPa). Infobox references

Dazomet is a common soil fumigant that acts as a herbicide, fungicide, slimicide, and nematicide.

== Applications ==
Dazomet is a chemical used to kill pests that inhibit plant growth through gaseous degradation. Dazomet is used as a soil sterilant on a variety of sites such as golf courses, nurseries, turf sites, and potting soils. Dazomet is used for soil sterilization as an alternative to methyl bromide. Although less effective it is still used to kill pests because of its comparatively lower toxicity. Dazomet is applied to wet soil, which causes dazomet itself to decompose into a gaseous form, which is what actively controls pests. The decomposition of dazomet releases methyl isothiocyanate (MITC) a gas toxic to pests that would prevent or kill plant growth. Dazomet and other methyl isothiocyanate generators are in IRAC group 8F. Dazomet has also been proven to be effective in the prevention of Phellinus noxius, or brown root rot disease.

== Synthesis ==
Dazomet is synthesized from carbon disulfide (CS_{2}) and diluted methylamine (CH_{3}NH_{2}). After stirring for 1-2 hours, an oily substance is formed, which is the intermediate methyldithiocarbamic acid (HS_{2}CNHCH_{3}). Then, formaldehyde (CH_{2}O) is added to the intermediate to form and precipitate out the dazomet.

== Form, color, and smell ==
Dazomet takes the form of colorless crystals. Dazomet is described as having a weakly pungent smell.

== Toxicology and safety ==
Dazomet is irritating to the eyes and its degradation product, MITC, is a dermal sensitizer. Dazomet is very toxic to aquatic organisms, and also acutely toxic to mammals. Exposure to dazomet can occur through several means; interaction with unincorporated granules, inhalation of it decomposition product, MITC, and/or water runoff.

== Stability and shelf life ==
Dazomet is stable at temperatures up to 35°C; it is sensitive to temperature >50°C and to moisture. Dazomet has a shelf life of at least two years when stored below 50°C.

== Mass spectrum ==
The molecular ion peak of dazomet is at 162 m/z. There are two major fragment peaks, one at 89 m/z and one at 42 m/z. The fragment peak at 89 m/z represents the loss of MITC, which is the major, gaseous degrade of dazomet.

== Patents ==
Patent #US5989597
Ambrose Rajamannan was the inventor of the novel process of continuously and instantaneously sterilizing soil using a water-activated fumigant. Dazomet is one water-activated fumigant that could be used. This process ensures 100% activation of the fumigant. Therefore, less fumigant would be needed to ensure that the soil would be completely sterilized.
Patent #CN1543787
See under § Synthesis
