= Pyridaben =

Names
- IUPAC name 2-tert-butyl-5-[(4-tert-butylphenyl)methylsulfanyl]-4-chloropyridazin-3-one
- Other names: Sanmite

Identifiers
| CAS Number | 96489-71-3 |
| 3D model (JSmol) | Interactive image |
| ChEBI | CHEBI:38626 |
| ChEMBL | ChEMBL225963 |
| ChemSpider | 82852 |
| ECHA InfoCard | 100.100.727 |
| EC Number | 405-700-3 |
| KEGG | C18614 |
| PubChem CID | 91754 |
| UNII | 2E4JBA5272 |
| CompTox Dashboard (EPA) | DTXSID5032573 |
- InChI: InChI=1S/C19H25ClN2OS/c1-18(2,3)14-9-7-13(8-10-14)12-24-15-11-21-22(19(4,5)6)17(23)16(15)20/h7-11H,12H2,1-6H3 Key: DWFZBUWUXWZWKD-UHFFFAOYSA-N
- SMILES: CC(C)(C)C1=CC=C(C=C1)CSC2=C(C(=O)N(N=C2)C(C)(C)C)Cl

Properties
| Chemical formula | C_{19}H_{25}ClN_{2}OS |
| Molar mass | 364.93 g·mol^{−1} |
| Appearance | white |
| Odor | odorless |
| Density | 1.2 g·cm^{−3} |
| Melting point | 111–112 °C (232–234 °F; 384–385 K) |
| Solubility in water | 0.012 mg/L (24 °C) |
| Solubility in acetone | 460 g/L (20 °C) |
| Solubility in xylene | 390 g/L (20 °C) |
| Solubility in cyclohexane | 320 g/L (20 °C) |
| Solubility in benzene | 110 g/L (20 °C) |
| Solubility in n-octanol | 63 g/L (20 °C) |
| Solubility in ethanol | 57 g/L (20 °C) |
| log P | 6.37 |
| Vapor pressure | 0.00000118 mmHg |

Hazards
- GHS labelling
| Pictograms | (GHS06: Toxic) (GHS09: Environmental hazard) |
| Signal word | Danger |
| Hazard statements | H301, H331, H410 |
| Precautionary statements | P261, P264, P270, P271, P273, P301+P316, P304+P340, P316, P321, P330, P391, P403+P233, P405, P501 |
- Except where otherwise noted, data are given for materials in their standard state (at 25 °C [77 °F], 100 kPa). Infobox references

Pyridaben is a chemical compound belonging to the class of pyridazinones.

== Properties ==
Pyridaben is a colorless solid that is practically insoluble in water. It is stable in aqueous solutions at pH values between 4 and 9 as well as in organic solvents, but it is relatively unstable upon exposure to light.

== Synthesis ==
Pyridaben can be synthesized by reacting mucochloric acid with p-tert-butylbenzyl mercaptan and subsequently treating the resulting product with tert-butylhydrazine.

== Uses ==
Pyridaben is used as an insecticide and acaricide and was developed by Nissan Chemical Industries.

== Approval ==
In the European Union, pyridaben was approved for use as an insecticide and acaricide, effective May 1, 2011. In Germany, Austria, and Switzerland, no plant protection products containing this active ingredient are approved.
