= Drug class =

Group of similar medications

A drug class is a group of medications and other compounds that share similar chemical structures, act through the same mechanism of action (i.e., binding to the same biological target), have similar modes of action, and/or are used to treat similar diseases. In the United States, the Food and Drug Administration has long worked to classify and license new medications. Its Drug Evaluation and Research Center categorizes these medications based on both their chemical and therapeutic classes.

In several major drug classification systems, these four types of classifications are organized into a hierarchy. For example, fibrates are a chemical class of drugs (amphipathic carboxylic acids) that share the same mechanism of action (PPAR agonist), the same mode of action (reducing blood triglyceride levels), and are used to prevent and treat the same disease (atherosclerosis). However, not all PPAR agonists are fibrates, not all triglyceride-lowering agents are PPAR agonists, and not all drugs used to treat atherosclerosis lower triglycerides. A drug class is typically defined by a prototype drug, the most important, and typically the first developed drug within the class, used as a reference for comparison.

== Comprehensive systems ==
- Anatomical Therapeutic Chemical Classification System (ATC) – Combines classification by organ system and therapeutic, pharmacological, and chemical properties into five levels.
- Systematized Nomenclature of Medicine (SNOMED) – includes a section devoted to drug classification

== Chemical class ==
This type of categorisation of drugs is from a chemical perspective and categorises them by their chemical structure. Examples of drug classes that are based on chemical structures include:

- Benzodiazepine
- Cannabinoid
- Cardiac glycoside
- Fibrate
- Gabapentinoid
- Steroid
- Thiazide diuretic
- Triptan
- β-lactam antibiotic

== Mechanism of action ==
This type of categorisation is from a pharmacological perspective and categorises them by their biological target. Drug classes that share a common molecular mechanism of action modulate the activity of a specific biological target. The definition of a mechanism of action also includes the type of activity at that biological target. For receptors, these activities include agonist, antagonist, inverse agonist, or modulator. Enzyme target mechanisms include activator or inhibitor. Ion channel modulators include opener or blocker. The following are specific examples of drug classes whose definition is based on a specific mechanism of action:

- 5-alpha-reductase inhibitor
- ACE inhibitor
- Alpha-adrenergic agonist
- Angiotensin II receptor antagonist
- Beta blocker
- Cholinergic
- Dopaminergic
- GABAergic
- Incretin mimetic
- Nonsteroidal anti-inflammatory drug − cyclooxygenase inhibitor
- Proton-pump inhibitor
- Renin inhibitor
- Selective glucocorticoid receptor modulator
- Serotonergic
- Statin – HMG-CoA reductase inhibitor

== Mode of alternative ==
This type of categorisation of drugs is from a biological perspective and categorises them by the anatomical or functional change they induce. Drug classes that are defined by common modes of action (i.e. the functional or anatomical change they induce) include:

- Antifungals
- Antimicrobials
- Antithrombotics
- Bronchodilator
- Chronotrope (positive or negative)
- Decongestant
- Diuretic or Antidiuretic
- Inotrope (positive or negative)

== Therapeutic class ==
This type of categorisation of drugs is from a medical perspective and categorises them by the pathology they are used to treat. Drug classes that are defined by their therapeutic use (the pathology they are intended to treat) include:

- Analgesics
- Antibiotic
- Anticancer
- Anticoagulant
- Antidepressant
- Antidiabetic
- Antiepileptic
- Antipsychotic
- Antispasmodic
- Antiviral
- Cardiovascular
- Depressant
- Sedative
- Stimulant

== Amalgamated classes ==
Some drug classes have been amalgamated from these three principles to meet practical needs. The class of nonsteroidal anti-inflammatory drugs (NSAIDs) is one such example. Strictly speaking, and also historically, the wider class of anti-inflammatory drugs also comprises steroidal anti-inflammatory drugs. These drugs were in fact the predominant anti-inflammatories during the decade leading up to the introduction of the term "nonsteroidal anti-inflammatory drugs." Because of the disastrous reputation that the corticosteroids had got in the 1950s, the new term, which offered to signal that an anti-inflammatory drug was not a steroid, rapidly gained currency. The drug class of "nonsteroidal anti-inflammatory drugs" (NSAIDs) is thus composed by one element ("anti-inflammatory") that designates the mechanism of action, and one element ("nonsteroidal") that separates it from other drugs with that same mechanism of action. Similarly, one might argue that the class of disease-modifying anti-rheumatic drugs (DMARD) is composed by one element ("disease-modifying") that albeit vaguely designates a mechanism of action, and one element ("anti-rheumatic drug") that indicates its therapeutic use.

- Disease-modifying antirheumatic drug (DMARD)
- Nonsteroidal anti-inflammatory drug (NSAID)

== Other systems of classification ==
Other systems of drug classification exist, for example the Biopharmaceutics Classification System which determines a drugs' attributes by solubility and intestinal permeability.

== Legal classification ==
- For the Canadian legal classification, see Controlled Drugs and Substances Act
- For the UK legal classification, see Drugs controlled by the UK Misuse of Drugs Act
- For the US legal classification, see Controlled Substances Act § Schedules of controlled substances
- Pregnancy category is defined using a variety of systems by different jurisdictions
