= Pyriproxyfen =

- Chemical structure of pyriproxyfen

Names
- IUPAC names 4-Phenoxyphenyl (R/S)-2-(2-pyridyloxy)propyl ether 2-[1-(4-Phenoxyphenoxy)propan-2-yloxy]pyridine

Identifiers
CAS Number	95737-68-1
3D model (JSmol)	Interactive image
ChEBI	CHEBI:39260
ChemSpider	82851
ECHA InfoCard	100.102.814
KEGG	C18605
PubChem CID	91753
UNII	3Q9VOR705O
CompTox Dashboard (EPA)	DTXSID1032640
- InChI: InChI=1S/C20H19NO3/c1-16(23-20-9-5-6-14-21-20)15-22-17-10-12-19(13-11-17)24-18-7-3-2-4-8-18/h2-14,16H,15H2,1H3 Key: NHDHVHZZCFYRSB-UHFFFAOYSA-N; InChI=1/C20H19NO3/c1-16(23-20-9-5-6-14-21-20)15-22-17-10-12-19(13-11-17)24-18-7-3-2-4-8-18/h2-14,16H,15H2,1H3 Key: NHDHVHZZCFYRSB-UHFFFAOYAG
- SMILES: O(c1ncccc1)C(COc3ccc(Oc2ccccc2)cc3)C

Properties
Chemical formula	C_{20}H_{19}NO_{3}
Molar mass	321.376 g·mol^{−1}
Appearance	Colorless crystals
Density	1.2 g/cm^{3}
Melting point	48–50 °C (118–122 °F; 321–323 K)
Boiling point	318 °C (604 °F; 591 K)
Solubility in water	0.367 mg/L

Pharmacology
ATCvet code	QP53AX23 (WHO)
- Except where otherwise noted, data are given for materials in their standard state (at 25 °C [77 °F], 100 kPa). verify (what is ?) Infobox references

Pyriproxyfen is a pesticide which is found to be effective against a variety of insects. It was introduced to the US in 1996, to protect cotton crops against whitefly. It has also been found useful for protecting other crops. It is also used as a prevention for flea control on household pets, for killing indoor and outdoor ants and roaches. Methods of application include aerosols, bait, carpet powders, foggers, shampoos and pet collars.

Pyriproxyfen is a juvenile hormone analog (IRAC group 7C) and an insect growth regulator. It prevents larvae from developing into adulthood and thus rendering them unable to reproduce.

In the US, pyriproxyfen is often marketed under the trade name Nylar, and is one of two active ingredients in Advantage II. In Europe, pyriproxyfen is known under the brand names Cyclio (Virbac) and Exil Flea Free TwinSpot (Emax).

It is used for vector control. Bed nets impregnated with a mixture of pyriproxyfen and pyrethroids are effective against pyrethroid resistant mosquitoes.

== Toxicity in mammals ==
Pyriproxyfen has low acute toxicity. According to WHO and FAO, at elevated doses exceeding 5000 mg/kg of body weight, pyriproxyfen affects the liver in mice, rats and dogs. It also changes cholesterol levels, and may cause modest anemia at high doses.

== Rumor of link to microcephaly outbreak in Brazil ==
Starting in 2014, pyriproxifen was put into Brazilian water supplies to fight the proliferation of mosquito larvae. This is in line with the World Health Organization (WHO)'s Pesticide Evaluation Scheme (WHOPES) for larvicides. In January 2016, the Brazilian Association for Collective Health (Abrasco; Portuguese: Associação Brasileira de Saúde Coletiva) criticized the introduction of pyriproxyfen in Brazil. Abrasco demanded the "immediate suspension of [use of] pyriproxyfen and all growth inhibitors ... in drinking water." The organization is opposed to the use of growth inhibitors in the context of an ongoing outbreak of fetal malformation.

On February 3, the rumor that pyriproxyfen, not the Zika virus, is the cause of the 2015-2016 microcephaly outbreak in Brazil was raised in a report of the Argentinean organization Physicians in the Crop-Sprayed Villages (PCST). It attracted wide media coverage. The statement from Abrasco was cited in the PCST report; subsequently, Abrasco clarified that position as a misinterpretation of their statement, saying "at no time did we state that pesticides, insecticides, or other chemicals are responsible for the increasing number of microcephaly cases in Brazil". They also condemned the behavior of the websites that spread the misinformation, adding that such "untruths...violates the anguish and suffering of the people in vulnerable positions". In addition, the coordinator for the PCST statement, Medardo Ávila Vazquez, acknowledged in an interview that "the group hasn't done any lab studies or epidemiological research to support its assertions, but it argues that using larvicides may cause human deformities."

On February 13, the Brazilian state of Rio Grande do Sul suspended pyriproxyfen's use, citing both Abrasco and PCST positions. The Health Minister of Brazil, Marcelo Castro, criticized this step, noting that the claim is "a rumor lacking logic and sense. It has no basis." They also noted that the insecticide is approved by the National Sanitary Monitoring Agency and "all regulatory agencies in the whole world". The manufacturer of the insecticide, Sumitomo Chemical, stated "there is no scientific basis for such a claim" and also referred to the approval of pyriproxyfen by the World Health Organization since 2004 and the United States Environmental Protection Agency since 2001.

George Dimech, the director of Disease Control and Diseases of the Health Department of Pernambuco in Brazil, gave an interview to the BBC where he pointed out that the city of Recife has the current highest reported number of cases of microcephaly, yet pyriproxyfen is not used in the region, but another insecticide altogether. He added that "this lack of spatial correlation weakens the idea that the larvicide is the cause of the problem." In addition, the BBC interviewed researchers in Pernambuco, where no evidence has been found of the cases being linked to any environmental cause like an insecticide. Neurologist Vanessa van der Linden stated in an interview, "Clinically, the changes we see in the scans of babies suggest that the injuries were caused by congenital infection and not by larvicide, drug or vaccine."

Noted skeptic David Gorski called the claim a conspiracy theory and pointed out that antivaccine proponents had also claimed that the Tdap vaccine was the cause of the microcephaly outbreak, due to its introduction in 2014, along with adding, "One can't help but wonder what else the Brazilian Ministry of Health did in 2014 that cranks can blame microcephaly on." Gorski also pointed out the extensive physiochemical understanding of pyriproxyfen coded in the WHO Guidelines for Drinking-water Quality, which concluded in a past evaluation that the insecticide is not genotoxic, and that the doctor organization making the claim has been advocating against all pesticides since 2010, complicating their reliability.

A professor from the University of Adelaide in Australia, stated that "The effect of pyriproxyfen on reproduction and fetal abnormalities is well studied in animals. In a variety of animal species even enormous quantities of pyriproxyfen do not cause the defects seen during the recent Zika outbreak." A colleague also from the University of Adelaide stated that "While the evidence that Zika virus is responsible for the rise in microcephaly in Brazil is not conclusive, the role of pyriproxyfen is simply not plausible." Another professor in Australia concluded that "insect development is quite different to human development and involves different hormones, developmental pathways and sets of genes, so it cannot be assumed that chemicals affecting insect development also influence mammalian development."

== See also ==
- Insect growth regulator
