= Pymetrozine =

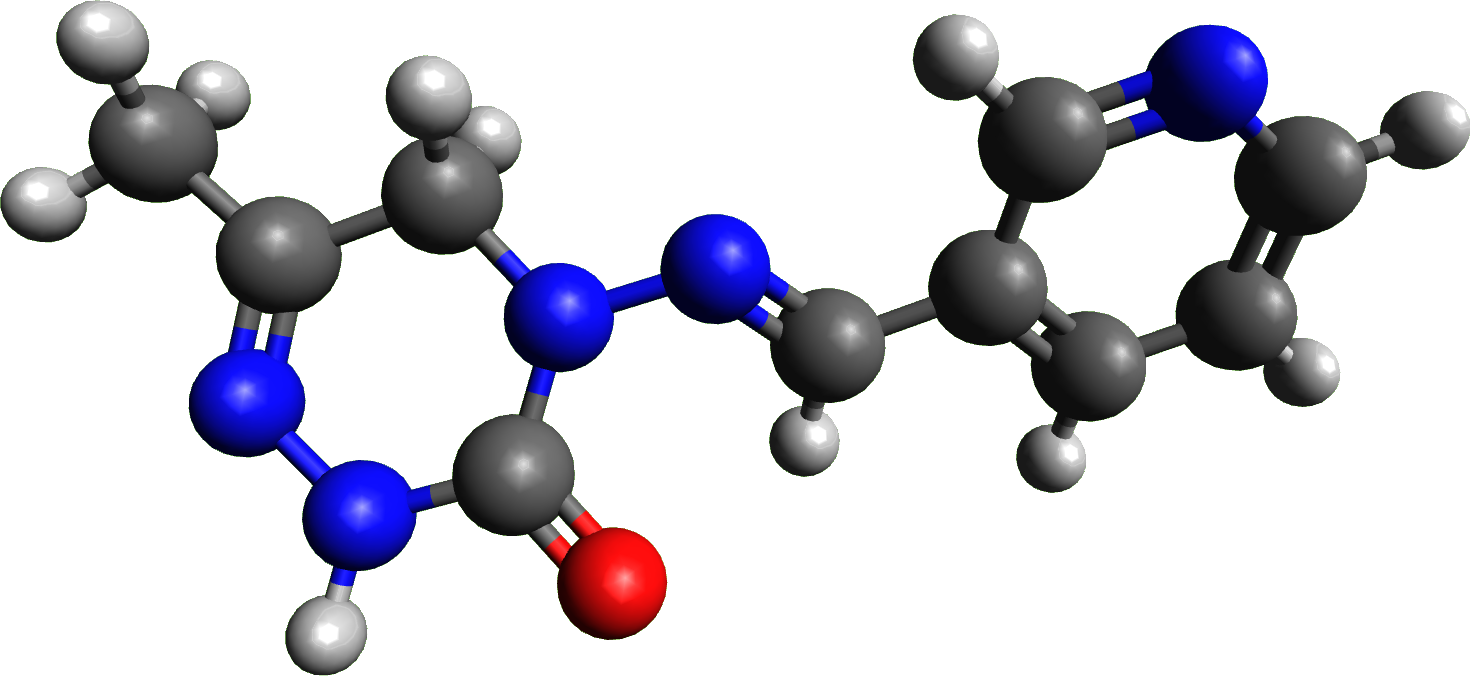

Names
- IUPAC name 6-methyl-4-[(E)-pyridin-3-ylmethylideneamino]-2,5-dihydro-1,2,4-triazin-3-one
- Other names Pymetrozin, Fulfill, Plenum, Endeavor

Identifiers
CAS Number	123312-89-0
3D model (JSmol)	Interactive image
ChEBI	CHEBI:39311
ChEMBL	ChEMBL1906026
ChemSpider	7850487
ECHA InfoCard	100.121.006
EC Number	602-927-1
KEGG	C18590
PubChem CID	9576037
UNII	F0G3V7874J
CompTox Dashboard (EPA)	DTXSID2032637
- InChI: InChI=1S/C10H11N5O/c1-8-7-15(10(16)14-13-8)12-6-9-3-2-4-11-5-9/h2-6H,7H2,1H3,(H,14,16)/b12-6+ Key: QHMTXANCGGJZRX-WUXMJOGZSA-N
- SMILES: CC1=NNC(=O)N(C1)/N=C/C2=CN=CC=C2

Properties
Chemical formula	C_{10}H_{11}N_{5}O
Molar mass	217.23 g/mol
Density	1.36 g/cm^{3}
Melting point	217 °C
Solubility in water	2.25g/l 20 °C(Ethanol); 290mg/l, 25 °C (Water); <0.001g/l, 20 °C (Hexane)

Hazards
- GHS labelling
Pictograms	(GHS07: Exclamation mark) (GHS08: Health hazard) (GHS09: Environmental hazard)
Signal word	Warning
Hazard statements	H332, H351, H361fd, H410, H412
Precautionary statements	P201, P273, P280, P301, P308+P313
- Lethal dose or concentration (LD, LC)
LD_{50} (median dose)	5820 mg/kg, Oral (Rat); >2000 mg/kg, percutaneous (Rat); >2000 mg/kg, oral (Bobwhite quail)
LC_{50} (median concentration)	>100 mg/l, (96 hr) (Rainbow trout); >5200 ppm, (8 day) (Bobwhite quail)
- Except where otherwise noted, data are given for materials in their standard state (at 25 °C [77 °F], 100 kPa). verify (what is ?) Infobox references

Pymetrozine is an insecticide in the pyridine-azomethine chemical class, primarily utilized for controlling homopteran pests, such as aphids and whiteflies, in agricultural settings. It selectively targets the nervous system of sap-feeding insects, causing them to cease feeding soon after ingestion. This unique mechanism limits impact on non-target beneficial insects. Pymetrozine has been extensively used on rice, potato and brassica crops as an alternative to organophosphorus pesticides.

== Mechanism of action ==
Pymetrozine is a neurotoxic insecticide that selectively affects chordotonal mechanoreceptors present in the legs of sap-feeding insects. It targetes specific ion channels in the nervous system of insects, particularly the transient receptor potential vanilloid (TRPV) channels. It is in IRAC group 9B. These channels, which consist of two key protein subunits, play a crucial role in insect sensory signal transduction. When pymetrozine binds to these channels, it alters their activity, leading to increased sensitivity and disruption of normal neuronal signaling. This results in abnormal behavior in target insects. Pymetrozine acts both on the plant's surface and internally, moving through vascular channels in multiple directions. It penetrates leaf tissues and remains effective when applied to either foliage or soil. It does not interfere with plant growth processes, even after leaf-targeted applications.

== Safety ==
Pymetrozine can cause cancer according to The Environmental Protection Agency (EPA). Pymetrozine is of low acute toxicity to humans, mammals, birds, aquatic organisms, and bees. It is a respiratory tract irritant and ingestion may affect major organs at high doses. It may cause reproductive or developmental defects.

== Ecotoxicity ==
Pymetrozine has low off-target effects.

The half-life of pymetrozine in water, soil, and rice plants is 2.81, 6.95, and 3.70 days respectively. Nicotinaldehyde (3-PCA) and 4-amino-6-methyl-3-oxo-2,3,4,5-tetrahydro-1,2,4-triazine are the primary photolysis products of pymetrozine. Exposure to 3-PCA has been reported to cause developmental toxicity in zebrafish.

== Use ==
The annual usage of pymetrozine was at least 4.45 × 10^{3} t in China according to its consumption (150 g/ha) and area of rice field (2.97 × 107 ha).
