= Streptomyces sioyaensis =

Scientific classification
- Domain: Bacteria
- Kingdom: Bacillati
- Phylum: Actinomycetota
- Class: Actinomycetes
- Order: Streptomycetales
- Family: Streptomycetaceae
- Genus: Streptomyces
- Species: S. sioyaensis

Binomial name
- Streptomyces sioyaensis Nishimura et al. 1961

Type strain
- ATCC 13989, ATCC 19810, BCRC 11878, CBS 198.75, CBS 563.68, CCRC 11878, CGMCC 4.1306, DSM 40032, H-690, IFO 12820, IMET 43860, ISP 5032, JCM 4418, KCC S-0418, KCTC 9043, NBIMCC 492, NBRC 12820, Nishimura H-690, NRRL B-5408, NRRL-ISP 5032, RIA 1090, UNIQEM 197, VKM Ac-1260

Species of bacterium

Streptomyces sioyaensis is a bacterium species from the genus of Streptomyces which has been isolated from soil. Streptomyces sioyaensis produces siomycine and altemicidin.

== See also ==
- List of Streptomyces species
