= Spirotetramat =

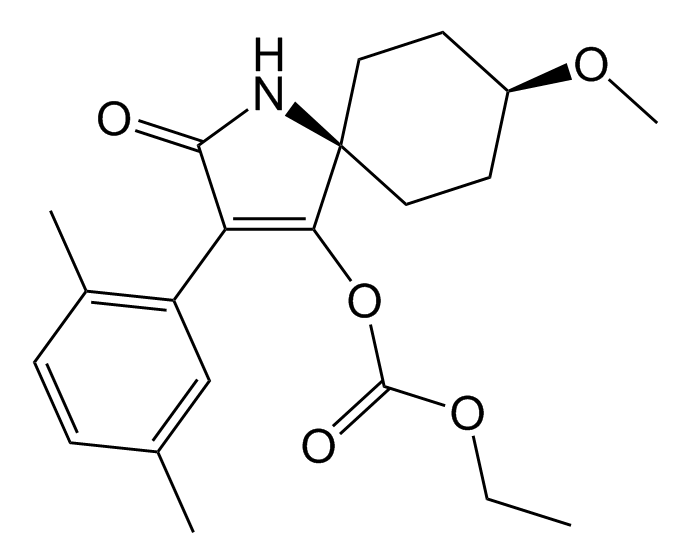
- Chemical structure of spirotetramat

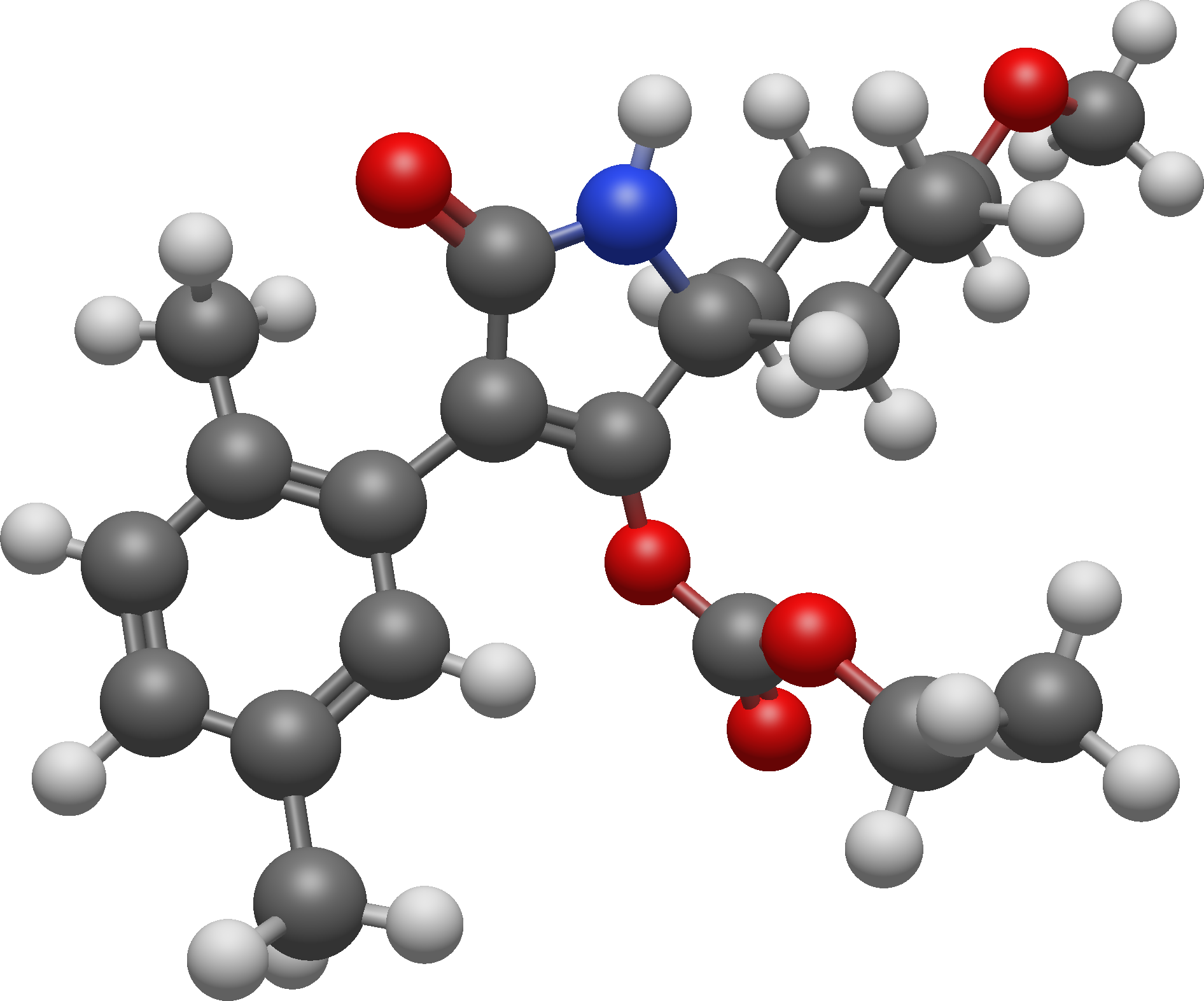
- Chemical structure of spirotetramat 3D

Names
- IUPAC name cis-3-(2,5-Xylyl)-4-(ethoxycarbonyloxy)-8-methoxy-1-azaspiro[4.5]dec-3-en-2-one
- Other names Spirotetramat, Movento, Ultor, cis-3-(2,5-dimethylphenyl)-8-methoxy-2-oxo-1-azaspiro[4.5]dec-3-en-4-yl ethyl carbonate

Identifiers
CAS Number	203313-25-1
3D model (JSmol)	Interactive image
ChEMBL	ChEMBL2229173
ChemSpider	8145165
ECHA InfoCard	100.106.958
EC Number	606-523-6
KEGG	C18807
PubChem CID	9969573
UNII	4G7KR034OX
CompTox Dashboard (EPA)	DTXSID7044342
- InChI: InChI=1S/C21H27NO5/c1-5-26-20(24)27-18-17(16-12-13(2)6-7-14(16)3)19(23)22-21(18)10-8-15(25-4)9-11-21/h6-7,12,15H,5,8-11H2,1-4H3,(H,22,23) Key: CLSVJBIHYWPGQY-UHFFFAOYSA-N
- SMILES: CCOC(=O)OC1=C(C(=O)NC12CCC(CC2)OC)C3=C(C=CC(=C3)C)C

Properties
Chemical formula	C_{21}H_{27}NO_{5}
Molar mass	373.449 g·mol^{−1}
Density	1.23 g/cm^{3}
Melting point	142 °C (288 °F; 415 K)
Boiling point	235 °C (455 °F; 508 K) (decomposes)
Solubility in water	Practically insoluble (0.03 g/L at 20 °C and pH 7)
Solubility in dichloromethane	Easily soluble
Acidity (pK_{a})	6.9

Hazards
- Occupational safety and health (OHS/OSH)
Main hazards	Irritant
- GHS labelling
Signal word	Warning
Hazard statements	H317, H319, H335, H361, H410
Precautionary statements	P201, P202, P261, P264, P271, P272, P273, P280, P281, P302+P352, P304+P340, P305+P351+P338, P308+P313, P312, P321, P333+P313, P337+P313, P363, P391, P403+P233, P405, P501
Flash point	Non-flammable
- Except where otherwise noted, data are given for materials in their standard state (at 25 °C [77 °F], 100 kPa). Infobox references

Spirotetramat (ISO Name) is a keto-enol insecticide developed by Bayer CropScience under the brand names Movento and Ultor.

== Mechanism ==
Spirotetramat is active against piercing-sucking insects, such as aphids, mites, and white flies, by acting as an ACC inhibitor, interrupting lipid biosynthesis in the insects, and is in IRAC group 23. It is a systemic insecticide that penetrates plant leaves when sprayed on. It is ambimobile, being transported both upwards and downwards through vascular bundles. In plants, it is hydrolyzed to the enol form by cleavage of the central ethoxycarbonyl group. This enol is more stable due to double bond being in a ring and the conjugation with the amide group and the benzene ring.

== Regulation ==
Bayer obtained spirotetramat's first regulatory approval in Tunisia in 2007. It was recognized by the European Union May 1, 2014.

== Toxicology and safety ==
Spirotetramat has moderate to low acute toxicity, is irritating to eyes and potentially sensitizing to skin. When tested on rats, it was not shown to be carcinogenic. In Denmark, it is listed as harmful to aquatic invertebrates, but not dangerous to bees.
