= Phenol ether =

O-alkyl derivative of phenol

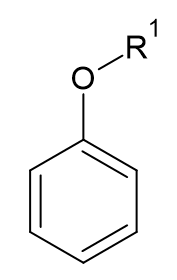
The general structure of a phenol ether.

In chemistry, a phenol ether (or aromatic ether) is an organic compound derived from phenol (C_{6}H_{5}OH), where the hydroxyl (-OH) group is substituted with an alkoxy (-OR) group. Usually phenol ethers are synthesized through the condensation of phenol and an organic alcohol; however, other known reactions regarding the synthesis of ethers can be applied to phenol ethers as well. Anisole (C_{6}H_{5}OCH_{3}) is the simplest phenol ether, and is a versatile precursor for perfumes and pharmaceuticals. Vanillin and ethylvanillin are phenol ether derivatives commonly utilized in vanilla flavorings and fragrances, while diphenyl ether is commonly used as a synthetic geranium fragrance. Phenol ethers are part of the chemical structure of a variety of medications, including quinine, an antimalarial drug, and dextromethorphan, an over-the-counter cough suppressant.

== Nomenclature ==
Phenol ethers follow the same nomenclature of regular ethers; ethers have the structure R-O-R’, but phenol ethers require that one of the substituents to be a phenyl group (abbreviated Ph), signifying a simple general structure of Ph-O-R’. As a result, the IUPAC nomenclature of phenol ethers will often take the form of “alkoxybenzene” or “phenoxyalkane,” where the alkane is some sort of hydrocarbon substituent.

The preference of the benzene ring in nomenclature relies on whether the alkane has more or less carbons than the benzene ring itself. Anisole is formally known as methoxybenzene, and is formed through the condensation of methanol (CH_{3}OH) and phenol; due to the methyl group attached to the ethereal oxygen being smaller than the aromatic benzene ring, the benzene takes priority when naming the molecule. However, 1-phenoxyoctane has an octane substituent, which has a greater number of carbons than a benzene ring.

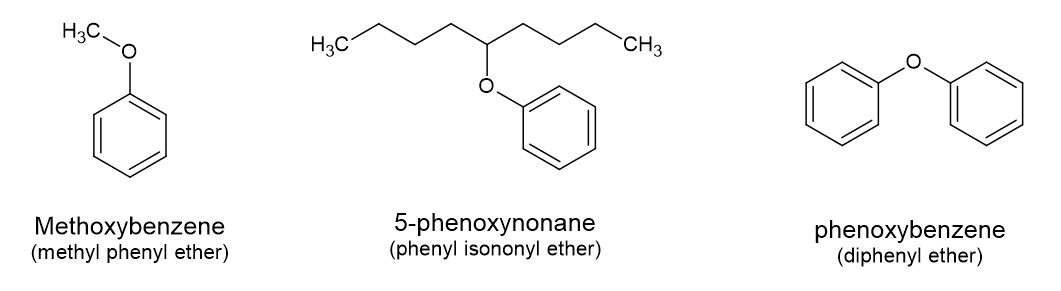
Examples of phenol ethers and their nomenclature. 5-phenoxynonane follows the same naming scheme as 1-phenoxyoctane, due to nonane having more carbons than a benzene ring.

When substituents on aromatic rings are present, standard IUPAC nomenclature should be followed when naming aromatic compounds.

== Structure and properties ==
Phenol ethers, similarly to regular ethers, are less hydrophilic than its precursors, phenols and alcohols, both of which can donate and accept hydrogen bonds. Phenol ethers, however, are still able to accept hydrogen bonds through the ethereal oxygen, allowing for its slight solubility in polar solvents. However, the presence of the aromatic ring reduces its solubility in polar solvents such as water and ethanol. Diethyl ether has higher water solubility of 8 g per 100 mL, versus diphenyl ether, with a solubility of 0.002 g per 100 mL.

The presence of the aromatic ring also draws electrons away from the ethereal oxygen, making the hydrolysis of a phenol ether significantly more difficult than that of an alkyl ether. The ethereal oxygen must be significantly nucleophilic in order for the ether to undergo acid-catalyzed hydrolysis.

== Preparation ==
Phenol ethers can be synthesized through an acid-catalyzed condensation of phenols and an alcohol. Phenols include phenol itself, benzenediols, polyphenols, and other phenol-derived molecules.

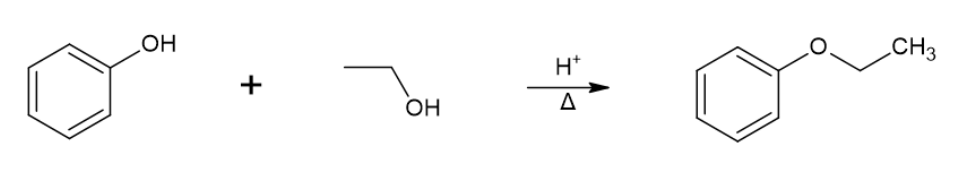
An acid catalyzed condensation between phenol and ethanol, forming ethoxybenzene.

However, this synthesis risks the self-condensation of alcohol itself (e.g. ethanol self-condenses to form diethyl ether). A more common and higher-yielding reaction is the Williamson ether synthesis, where a phenol is converted by a strong base to the phenoxide ion, which can subsequently be reacted with an alkyl halide via nucleophilic substitution to form the desired phenol ether. Primary alkyl halides work best, as secondary and tertiary alkyl halides prefer the E2 elimination product. This ether synthesis removes the risk of self-condensation, and yields can be as high as 95% in the laboratory.

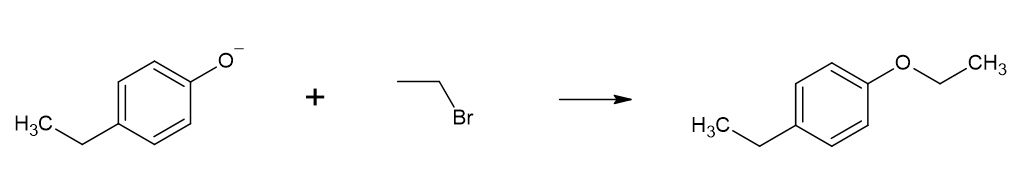
A Williamson ether synthesis between p-ethylphenolate and bromoethane to form 4-ethyl-1-ethoxybenzene.

Bis-aryl ethers (such as diphenyl ether) cannot be synthesized through the Williamson ether synthesis, however, as aryl halides cannot undergo nucleophilic substitution. As such, an Ullmann condensation can be employed: an aryl halide is able to react with phenol (or its derivatives) to form a bis-aryl ether in the presence of a copper-based catalyst, such as copper(II) oxide.

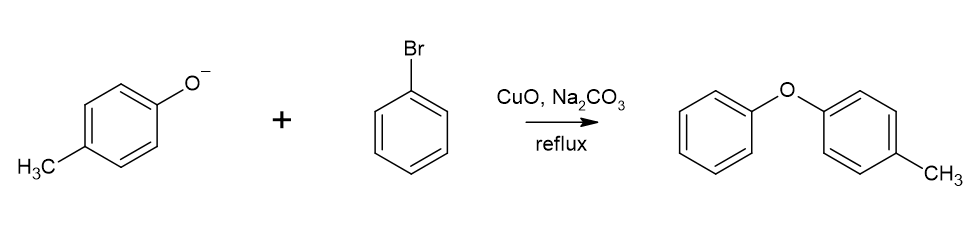
An Ullmann condensation between p-methylphenolate and bromobenzene in the presence of a copper catalyst to form 4-methyl-1-phenoxybenzene.

== Applications and occurrence ==
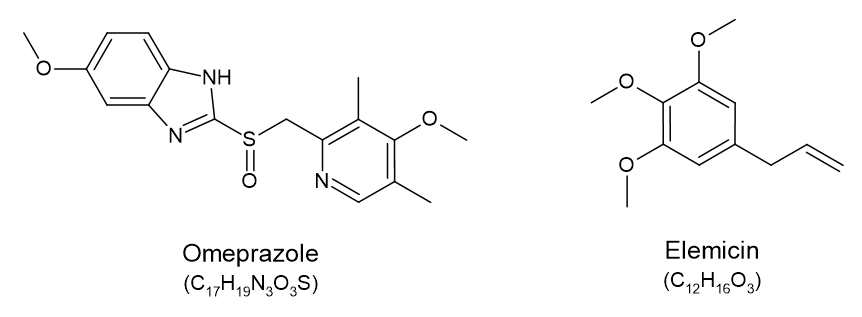
Omeprazole and elemicin are examples of useful molecules containing phenol ether substituents.

Phenol ethers are often utilized in pharmaceutical design as a substituent that acts as a hydrogen-bond acceptor but not a hydrogen-bond donor; this allows many oral medications to follow Lipinski’s rule of five. By replacing the acidic hydrogen on phenol with that of an alkyl group, the toxicity of phenols is also reduced; the LD50 of phenol in rats when administered orally is 317 mg/kg, compared to 3500-4000 mg/kg for anisole, the methyl ether. Furthermore, ethers are significantly more hydrophobic than phenols and can be more easily absorbed by the digestive system than the phenol substituent itself, and allows for oral intake of such medicines. For instance, omeprazole, an oral medication that treats acid reflux, contains two phenol ether substituents.

Due to the increased hydrophobicity of phenol ethers compared to traditional phenols, phenol ethers are often present in the essential oils of plants. Anethole, a simpler compound containing only one phenol ether substituent, is the main component in the oil of anise fruits. Elemicin, a naturally occurring organic compound containing three phenol ether substituents, is a major component in the oils of nutmeg and mace.
