= Chitin synthase =

Class of enzymes

chitin synthase

Identifiers
- EC no.: 2.4.1.16
- CAS no.: 9030-18-6

Databases
- IntEnz: IntEnz view
- BRENDA: BRENDA entry
- ExPASy: NiceZyme view
- KEGG: KEGG entry
- MetaCyc: metabolic pathway
- PRIAM: profile
- PDB structures: RCSB PDB PDBe PDBsum
- Gene Ontology: AmiGO / QuickGO
Search
- PMC: articles
- PubMed: articles
- NCBI: proteins

In enzymology, a chitin synthase (EC 2.4.1.16) is an enzyme that catalyzes the chemical reaction

UDP-N-acetyl-D-glucosamine + [1,4-(N-acetyl-beta-D-glucosaminyl)]n $\rightleftharpoons$ UDP + [1,4-(N-acetyl-beta-D-glucosaminyl)]n^{+}1

Thus, the two substrates of this enzyme are UDP-N-acetyl-D-glucosamine and [[[1,4-(N-acetyl-beta-D-glucosaminyl)]n]], whereas its two products are UDP and [[[1,4-(N-acetyl-beta-D-glucosaminyl)]n+1]].

This enzyme belongs to the family of glycosyltransferases, specifically the hexosyltransferases. The systematic name of this enzyme class is UDP-N-acetyl-D-glucosamine:chitin 4-beta-N-acetylglucosaminyl-transferase. Other names in common use include chitin-UDP N-acetylglucosaminyltransferase, chitin-uridine diphosphate acetylglucosaminyltransferase, chitin synthetase, and trans-N-acetylglucosaminosylase. This enzyme participates in aminosugars metabolism.

== Production ==
Chitin Synthase is manufactured in the rough endoplasmic reticulum of fungi as the inactive form, zymogen. The zymogen is then packaged into chitosomes in the golgi apparatus. Chitosomes bring the zymogen to the hyphal tip of a mold or yeast cell membrane. Chitin synthase is placed into the interior side of the cell membrane and then activated.

== Inhibition ==
Benzoylurea as well as other insecticides act as insect growth regulators by inhibiting this enzyme and thus preventing the formation of chitin. They are in IRAC mode of action groups 10, 15 and 16.
