= Acequinocyl =

Names
- IUPAC name (3-dodecyl-1,4-dioxonaphthalen-2-yl) acetate

Identifiers
CAS Number	57960-19-7
3D model (JSmol)	Interactive image
ChEBI	CHEBI:38592
ChEMBL	ChEMBL1869353
ChemSpider	84245
ECHA InfoCard	100.110.102
EC Number	611-595-7
KEGG	C18535
PubChem CID	93315
UNII	MQN165D1MB
CompTox Dashboard (EPA)	DTXSID8034297
- InChI: InChI=1S/C24H32O4/c1-3-4-5-6-7-8-9-10-11-12-17-21-22(26)19-15-13-14-16-20(19)23(27)24(21)28-18(2)25/h13-16H,3-12,17H2,1-2H3 Key: QDRXWCAVUNHOGA-UHFFFAOYSA-N
- SMILES: CCCCCCCCCCCCC1=C(C(=O)C2=CC=CC=C2C1=O)OC(=O)C

Properties
Chemical formula	C_{24}H_{32}O_{4}
Molar mass	384.516 g·mol^{−1}
Appearance	yellowish
Odor	faintly earthy
Density	1.15 g·cm^{−3}
Melting point	59.6 °C (139.3 °F; 332.8 K)
Solubility in water	6.69×10^{−3} mg/L
Solubility in n-hexane	44 g/L
Solubility in toluene	450 g/L
Solubility in dichloromethane	620 g/L
Solubility in acetone	220 g/L
Solubility in methanol	7.8 g/L
Solubility in dimethylformamide	190 g/L
log P	6.2
Vapor pressure	0.00000001 mmHg
Viscosity	405.95 cSt (20 °C); 217.23 cSt (40 °C)

Hazards
- GHS labelling
Pictograms	(GHS07: Exclamation mark) (GHS08: Health hazard) (GHS09: Environmental hazard)
Signal word	Danger
Hazard statements	H317, H370, H373, H410
Precautionary statements	P260, P264, P270, P272, P273, P280, P302+P352, P308+P316, P319, P321, P333+P317, P362+P364, P391, P405, P501
- Except where otherwise noted, data are given for materials in their standard state (at 25 °C [77 °F], 100 kPa). Infobox references

Acequinocyl is an acaricide used primarily against mites; it inhibits their mitochondrial electron transport. It is a chemical compound belonging to the class of carboxylic acid esters, specifically the 1,4-naphthoquinones.

== Uses ==
Acequinocyl is used as an acaricide in fruit cultivation. It acts as an inhibitor of mitochondrial electron transport at Complex III and was approved in Germany in 2008.

== Approval ==
An EU decision regarding the approval of acequinocyl as a plant protection active ingredient is still pending; however, member states may grant provisional approvals.

In Germany, Austria, and Switzerland, plant protection products (such as Kanemite) containing this active ingredient are approved.
