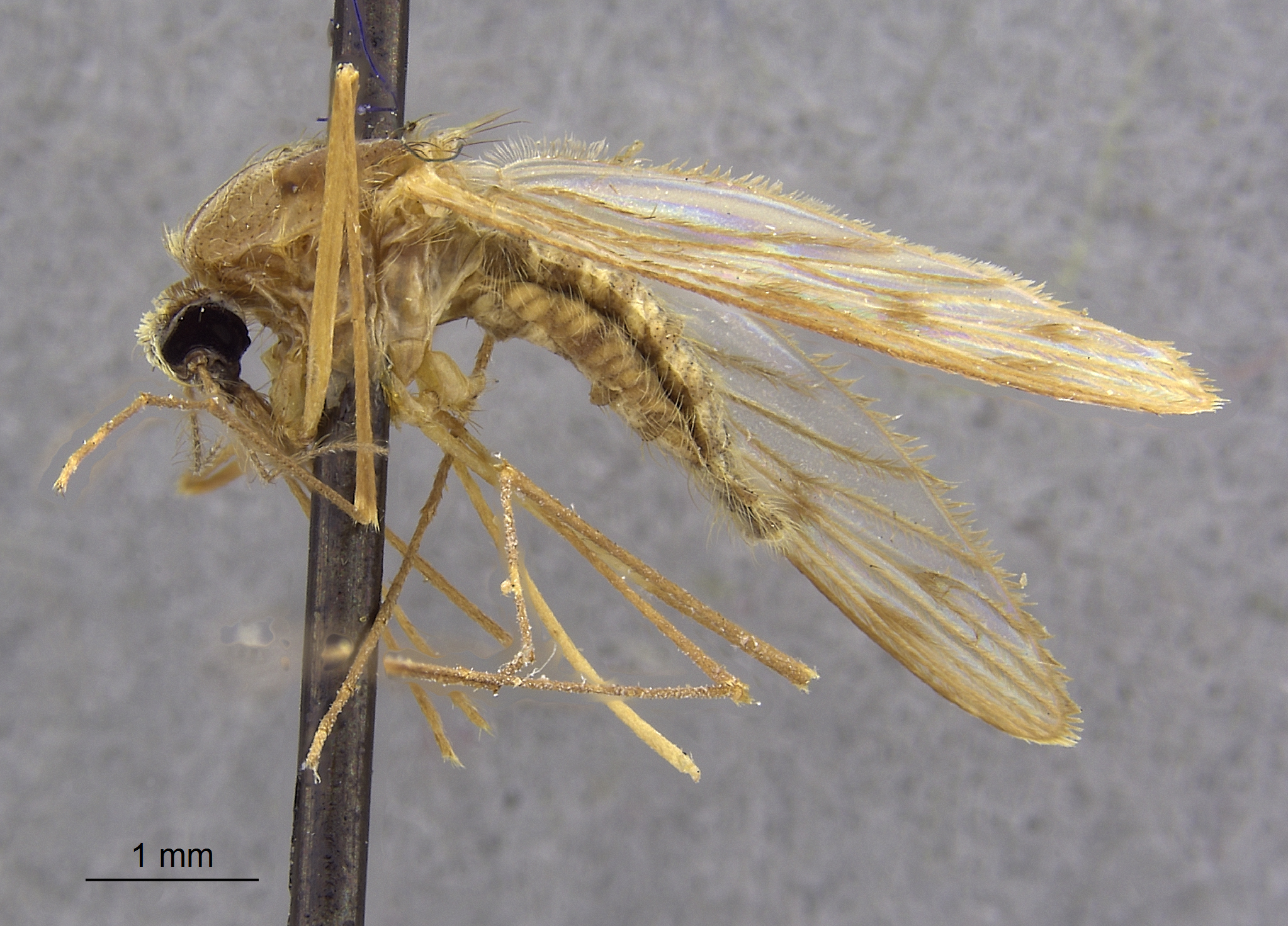

Scientific classification
- Kingdom: Animalia
- Phylum: Arthropoda
- Class: Insecta
- Order: Diptera
- Family: Culicidae
- Genus: Anopheles
- Subgenus: Anopheles
- Species: A. hermsi

Binomial name
- Anopheles hermsi Barr and Guptavanij, 1989

= Anopheles hermsi =

Species of mosquito

Anopheles hermsi is a species of mosquito in the family Culicidae. It is a known vector of Plasmodium vivax malaria. An. hermsi have been collected in Southern California.
