= Nicotinamidase =

Class of enzymes

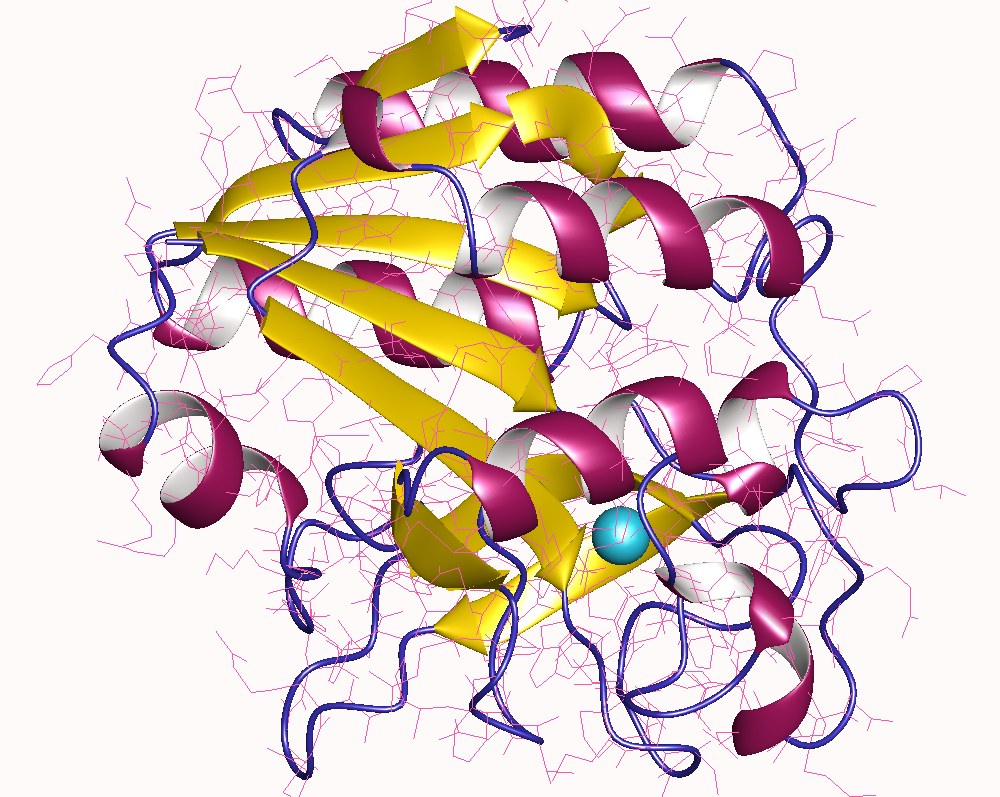
- Nicotinamidase monomer, Saccharomyces cerevisiae

Identifiers
- EC no.: 3.5.1.19
- CAS no.: 9033-32-3

Databases
- BRENDA: enzyme data
- ExPASy: NiceZyme view
- KEGG: enzyme entry
- MetaCyc: metabolic pathway
- Rhea: reactions
- PDB structures: RCSB PDB PDBe PDBsum
- Gene Ontology: AmiGO / QuickGO
Search
- PMC: articles
- PubMed: articles
- NCBI: proteins

Nicotinamidase (EC 3.5.1.19) is an enzyme that catalyzes the chemical reaction

nicotinamide
H_{2}O
NH_{3}
nicotinic acid

The enzyme characterised from Aspergillus niger and mammalian liver hydrolyses nicotinamide to nicotinic acid and ammonia. This reaction is part of the salvage pathway for nicotinamide adenine dinucleotide. Inhibition of the enzyme has been suggested as a mechanism of insect control.

The prodrug, pyrazinamide, is converted into the bacteriostatic pyrazinoic acid by this enzyme in Mycobacterium tuberculosis.

This enzyme is a hydrolase, one acting on carbon-nitrogen bonds other than peptide bonds, specifically in linear amides. The systematic name of this enzyme class is nicotinamide amidohydrolase. Other names in common use include nicotinamide deaminase, nicotinamide amidase, and YNDase.

== Structural studies ==
As of late 2007, 3 structures have been solved for this class of enzymes, with PDB accession codes PDB: 1ILW, PDB: 1IM5, and PDB: 2H0R.
