= Acaricide =

Agent that kills members of the arachnid subclass Acari

Chemical structure of permethrin, a common acaricide

Acaricides are pesticides that kill members of the arachnid subclass Acari, which includes ticks and mites. Acaricides are used both in medicine and agriculture, although the desired selective toxicity differs between the two fields.

== Terminology ==
More specific words are sometimes used, depending upon the targeted group:

- "Ixodicides" are substances that kill ticks.
- "Miticides" are substances that kill mites.
- The term scabicide is more narrow, and refers to agents specifically targeting Sarcoptes.
- The term "arachnicide" is more general, and refers to agents that target arachnids. This term is used much more rarely, but occasionally appears in informal writing.

As a practical matter, mites are a paraphyletic grouping, and mites and ticks are usually treated as a single group.

== Examples ==
Examples include:

- Permethrin can be applied as a spray. The effects are not limited to mites; lice, cockroaches, fleas, mosquitos, and other insects are affected.
- Ivermectin can be prescribed by a medical doctor to rid humans of mite and lice infestations, and agricultural formulations are available for infested birds and rodents.
- Antibiotic miticides
- Carbamate miticides
- Dienochlor miticides
- Formamidine miticides
- Oxalic acid is used by some beekeepers against the parasitic varroa mite.
- Organophosphate miticides
- Diatomaceous earth will also kill mites by disrupting their cuticles, which dries out the mites.
- Dicofol, a compound structurally related to the insecticide DDT, is a miticide that is effective against the red spider mite Tetranychus urticae.
- Lime sulfur is effective against sarcoptic mange. It is made by mixing hydrated lime, sulfur, and water, and boiling for about 1 hour. Hydrated lime can bond with about 1.7 times its weight of sulfur (quicklime can bond with as much as 2.2 times its weight of sulfur). The strongest concentrate is diluted 1:32 before saturating the skin (avoiding the eyes), applied at six-day intervals.
- A variety of commercially available systemic and non-systemic miticides: abamectin, acequinocyl, bifenazate, chlorfenapyr, clofentezine, cyflumetofen, cypermethrin, dicofol, etoxazole, fenazaquin, fenpyroximate, hexythiazox, imidacloprid, propargite, pyridaben, spiromesifen, spirotetramat.

Acaricides are also being used in attempts to stop rhinoceros poaching. Holes are drilled into the horn of a sedated rhino and acaricide is pumped in and pressurized. Should the horn be consumed by humans as in traditional Chinese medicine, it is expected to cause nausea, stomachache, and diarrhea, or convulsions, depending on the quantity, but not fatalities. Signs posted at wildlife refuges that the rhinos therein have been treated are thus expected to deter poaching. The original idea grew out of research into using the horn as a reservoir for one-time tick treatments; the acaricide is selected to be safe for the rhino, oxpeckers, vultures, and other animals in the preserve's ecosystem.

== See also ==
- Ticks of domestic animals
