= Mode of action =

Functional/anatomical change at cellular level due to a substance

In pharmacology and biochemistry, mode of action (MoA) describes a functional or anatomical change, resulting from the exposure of a living organism to a substance. In comparison, a mechanism of action (MOA) describes such changes at the molecular level.

A mode of action is important in classifying chemicals, as it represents an intermediate level of complexity in between molecular mechanisms and physiological outcomes, especially when the exact molecular target has not yet been elucidated or is subject to debate. A mechanism of action of a chemical could be "binding to DNA" while its broader mode of action would be "transcriptional regulation". However, there is no clear consensus and the term mode of action is also often used, especially in the study of pesticides, to describe molecular mechanisms such as action on specific nuclear receptors or enzymes. Despite this, there are classification attempts, such as the HRAC's classification to manage pesticide resistance.

== See also ==
- Mechanism of action in pharmaceuticals
- Adverse outcome pathway
