= Muscavirus =

Virus classification
- (unranked): Virus
- Class: Naldaviricetes
- Order: Lefavirales
- Family: Hytrosaviridae
- Genus: Muscavirus

Genus of viruses

Muscavirus is a genus of viruses, in the family Hytrosaviridae. The fly Musca domestica is the natural host. There is only one species in this genus: Musca domestica salivary gland hypertrophy virus (Muscavirus musdomesticae). Diseases associated with this genus include: salivary gland hypertrophy, and complete sterility of infected female flies by inhibiting eggs development.

== Structure ==
Viruses in the genus Muscavirus are enveloped, with rod-shaped geometries. The diameter is around 50 nm. Genomes are circular, around 124kb in length. The genome has 108 open reading frames.

Genus	Structure	Symmetry	Capsid	Genomic arrangement	Genomic segmentation
Muscavirus	Rod-shaped		Enveloped	Circular	Monopartite

== Life cycle ==
Viral replication is nuclear. DNA-templated transcription is the method of transcription. Musca domestica serve as the natural host. Transmission routes are parental and contamination.

Genus	Host details	Tissue tropism	Entry details	Release details	Replication site	Assembly site	Transmission
Muscavirus	Insects: house flies	Epithelium: secretory salivary glands; ovarioles; gonads	Contact: food; horizontal; vertical	Budding; horizontal; vertical	Nucleus	Nucleus	Contact: food; horizontal; vertical
