= Alphabaculovirus =

Virus classification
- (unranked): Virus
- Class: Naldaviricetes
- Order: Lefavirales
- Family: Baculoviridae
- Genus: Alphabaculovirus

Genus of viruses

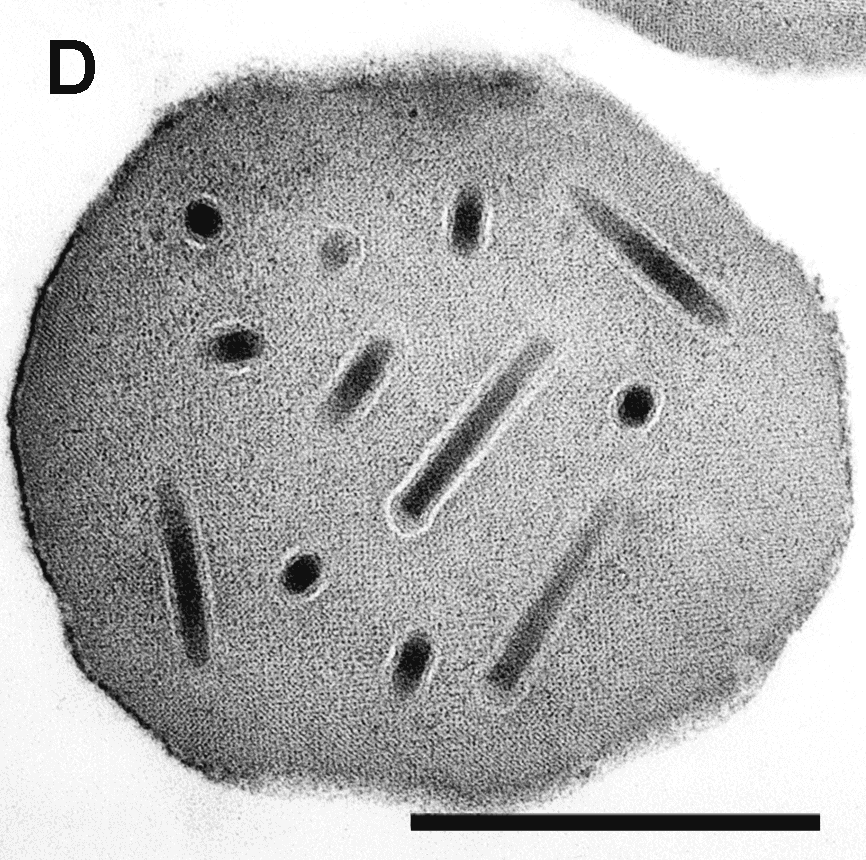
Occlusion bodies of baculoviruses in the genus Alphabaculovirus. Transmission electron micrographs of Trichoplusia ni single nucleopolyhedrovirus occlusion bodies containing occlusion-derived virus consisting of multiple and single nucleocapsids per envelope. Scale bar: 0.5 μm.

Alphabaculovirus is a genus of viruses in the family Baculoviridae. The natural hosts of species in this family are invertebrates, among them winged insects (Lepidopterans, Hymenopterans, Dipterans), and decapods. However, species in this genus have been isolated only from the insect order Lepidoptera. There are 71 species in the genus.

== Structure ==
Viruses in Alphabaculovirus are enveloped, with circular genomes around 80–180 kbp in length. The genome codes for 100 to 180 proteins.

Genus	Structure	Symmetry	Capsid	Genomic arrangement	Genomic segmentation
Alphabaculovirus	Budded or Occluded		Enveloped	Circular	Monopartite

== Life cycle ==
Alphabaculovirus replication is nuclear. Entry into the host cell is achieved by attachment of the viral glycoproteins to host receptors, which mediates endocytosis. Replication follows the double-stranded DNA bidirectional replication model. DNA-templated transcription with some alternative splicing mechanism is the method of transcription. Translation takes place by leaky scanning. The virus exits the host cell by nuclear pore export and exists in occlusion bodies after cell death, remaining infectious until finding another host. Winged insects, arthropods, Lepidoptera, Hymenoptera, Diptera, and Decapoda serve as natural hosts. Transmission routes are fecal-oral.

Genus	Host details	Tissue tropism	Entry details	Release details	Replication site	Assembly site	Transmission
Alphabaculovirus	Winged insects	Midgut then hemocoel; digestive gland epithelium (shrimps)	Glycoproteins	Budding; Occlusion	Nucleus	Nucleus	Oral-fecal

== Taxonomy ==
The genus contains the following species, listed by scientific name and followed by the exemplar virus of the species:

- Alphabaculovirus adhonmai, Adoxophyes honmai nucleopolyhedrovirus
- Alphabaculovirus agipsilonis, Agrotis ipsilon multiple nucleopolyhedrovirus
- Alphabaculovirus agsegetum, Agrotis segetum nucleopolyhedrovirus A
- Alphabaculovirus alteragsegetum, Agrotis segetum nucleopolyhedrovirus B
- Alphabaculovirus alterchofumiferanae, Choristoneura fumiferana DEF multiple nucleopolyhedrovirus
- Alphabaculovirus alterchrincludentis, Chrysodeixis includens nucleopolyhedrovirus
- Alphabaculovirus alterhycuneae, Hypantria cunea nucleopolyhedrovirus B
- Alphabaculovirus altermyunipunctae, Mythimna unipuncta nucleopolyhedrovirus
- Alphabaculovirus altersperidaniae, Spodoptera eridania nucleopolyhedrovirus
- Alphabaculovirus alterspexiguae, Spodoptera exigua multiple nucleopolyhedrovirus
- Alphabaculovirus angemmatalis, Anticarsia gemmatalis multiple nucleopolyhedrovirus
- Alphabaculovirus anpernyi, Antheraea pernyi nucleopolyhedrovirus
- Alphabaculovirus ardigrammae, Artaxa digramma nucleopolyhedrovirus
- Alphabaculovirus aucalifornicae, Autographa californica multiple nucleopolyhedrovirus
- Alphabaculovirus bomori, Bombyx mori nucleopolyhedrovirus
- Alphabaculovirus busuppressariae, Buzura suppressaria nucleopolyhedrovirus
- Alphabaculovirus calabietis, Calliteara abietis nucleopolyhedrovirus
- Alphabaculovirus capomonae, Catopsilia pomona nucleopolyhedrovirus
- Alphabaculovirus chofumiferanae, Choristoneura fumiferana multiple nucleopolyhedrovirus
- Alphabaculovirus chomurinanae, Choristoneura murinana nucleopolyhedrovirus
- Alphabaculovirus chorosaceanae, Choristoneura rosaceana nucleopolyhedrovirus
- Alphabaculovirus chrincludentis, Pseudoplusia includens single nucleopolyhedrovirus
- Alphabaculovirus chrychalcites, Chrysodeixis chalcites nucleopolyhedrovirus
- Alphabaculovirus clabilineatae, Clanis bilineata nucleopolyhedrovirus
- Alphabaculovirus covestigialis, Condylorrhiza vestigialis multiple nucleopolyhedrovirus
- Alphabaculovirus crypeltasticae, Cryptophlebia peltastica nucleopolyhedrovirus
- Alphabaculovirus cycundantis, Cyclophragma undans nucleopolyhedrovirus
- Alphabaculovirus dijunonis, Dione juno nucleopolyhedrovirus
- Alphabaculovirus ecobliquae, Ectropis obliqua nucleopolyhedrovirus
- Alphabaculovirus eppostvittanae, Epiphyas postvittana nucleopolyhedrovirus
- Alphabaculovirus erankerariae, Erannis ankeraria nucleopolyhedrovirus
- Alphabaculovirus eupseudoconspersae, Euproctis pseudoconspersa nucleopolyhedrovirus
- Alphabaculovirus helarmigerae, Helicoverpa armigera nucleopolyhedrovirus
- Alphabaculovirus heleucae, Hemileuca sp. nucleopolyhedrovirus
- Alphabaculovirus hycuneae, Hyphantria cunea nucleopolyhedrovirus
- Alphabaculovirus hytalacae, Hyposidra talaca nucleopolyhedrovirus
- Alphabaculovirus lafiscellariae, Lambdina fiscellaria nucleopolyhedrovirus
- Alphabaculovirus leseparatae, Leucania separata nucleopolyhedrovirus
- Alphabaculovirus lonobliquae, Lonomia obliqua multiple nucleopolyhedrovirus
- Alphabaculovirus lydisparis, Lymantria dispar multiple nucleopolyhedrovirus
- Alphabaculovirus lyxylinae, Lymantria xylina multiple nucleopolyhedrovirus
- Alphabaculovirus mabrassicae, Mamestra brassicae multiple nucleopolyhedrovirus
- Alphabaculovirus maconfiguratae, Mamestra configurata nucleopolyhedrovirus A
- Alphabaculovirus mavitratae, Maruca vitrata nucleopolyhedrovirus
- Alphabaculovirus mysequacis, Mythimna sequax nucleopolyhedrovirus
- Alphabaculovirus myunipunctae, Mythimna unipuncta nucleopolyhedrovirus
- Alphabaculovirus olmendosae, Olene mendosa nucleopolyhedrovirus
- Alphabaculovirus opbrumatae, Operophtera brumata nucleopolyhedrovirus
- Alphabaculovirus orleucostigmae, Orgyia leucostigma nucleopolyhedrovirus
- Alphabaculovirus orpseudotsugatae, Orgyia pseudotsugata multiple nucleopolyhedrovirus
- Alphabaculovirus oxochraceae, Oxyplax ochracea nucleopolyhedrovirus
- Alphabaculovirus pastagnalis, Parapoynx stagnalis nucleopolyhedrovirus
- Alphabaculovirus pavitrealis, Palpita vitrealis nucleopolyhedrovirus
- Alphabaculovirus peluscae, Perigonia lusca single nucleopolyhedrovirus
- Alphabaculovirus pesauciae, Peridroma species nucleopolyhedrovirus
- Alphabaculovirus plidaeusalis, Platynota idaeusalis nucleopolyhedrovirus
- Alphabaculovirus ranus, Rachiplusia nu nucleopolyhedrovirus
- Alphabaculovirus raous, Rachiplusia ou multiple nucleopolyhedrovirus
- Alphabaculovirus speridaniae, Spodoptera eridania nucleopolyhedrovirus
- Alphabaculovirus spexemptae, Spodoptera exempta nucleopolyhedrovirus
- Alphabaculovirus spexiguae, Spodoptera exigua multiple nucleopolyhedrovirus
- Alphabaculovirus splittoralis, Spodoptera littoralis nucleopolyhedrovirus
- Alphabaculovirus spliturae, Spodoptera litura nucleopolyhedrovirus
- Alphabaculovirus spocosmioidis, Spodoptera cosmioides nucleopolyhedrovirus
- Alphabaculovirus spofrugiperdae, Spodoptera frugiperda multiple nucleopolyhedrovirus
- Alphabaculovirus sujujubae, Sucra jujuba nucleopolyhedrovirus
- Alphabaculovirus thorichlaceae, Thysanoplusia orichalcea nucleopolyhedrovirus
- Alphabaculovirus travishnous, Trabala vishnou gigantina nucleopolyhedrovirus
- Alphabaculovirus trini, Trichoplusia ni single nucleopolyhedrovirus
- Alphabaculovirus urprotei, Urbanus proteus nucleopolyhedrovirus
- Alphabaculovirus wisignatae, Wiseana signata nucleopolyhedrovirus
