= Glossinavirus =

Virus classification
- (unranked): Virus
- Class: Naldaviricetes
- Order: Lefavirales
- Family: Hytrosaviridae
- Genus: Glossinavirus

Genus of viruses

Glossinavirus is a genus of viruses, in the family Hytrosaviridae. Glossina sp serve as natural hosts. There is only one species in this genus: Glossina pallidipes salivary gland hypertrophy virus (Glossinavirus glopallidipedis). Diseases associated with this genus include: partial sterility due to ovarian abnormalities or to testicular degeneration; can be asymptomatic in laboratory colonies.

== Structure ==
Viruses in the genus Glossinavirus are enveloped, with rod-shaped geometries. The diameter is around 50 nm. Genomes are circular, around 190kb in length. The genome has 160 open reading frames.

Genus	Structure	Symmetry	Capsid	Genomic arrangement	Genomic segmentation
Glossinavirus	Rod-shaped		Enveloped	Circular	Monopartite

== Life cycle ==
Viral replication is nuclear. DNA-templated transcription is the method of transcription. Glossina species serve as the natural host. Transmission routes are parental.

Genus	Host details	Tissue tropism	Entry details	Release details	Replication site	Assembly site	Transmission
Glossinavirus	Insects: tsetse flies	Epithelium: secretory salivary glands; ovarioles; gonads	Horizontal; vertical	Horizontal; vertical	Nucleus	Nucleus	Horizontal; vertical
