= Autographa californica multiple nucleopolyhedrovirus =

Virus classification
- (unranked): Virus
- Class: Naldaviricetes
- Order: Lefavirales
- Family: Baculoviridae
- Genus: Alphabaculovirus
- Species: Alphabaculovirus aucalifornicae

Species of virus

Autographa californica multiple nucleopolyhedrovirus (AcMNPV) is a nucleopolyhedrovirus belonging to the family Baculoviridae. It has a double-stranded DNA genome that is 133,894 base pairs in length with 155 ORFs. The virus forms occluded bodies called polyhedra each containing multiple virions. AcMNPV has been shown to infect more than thirty lepidopteran hosts from 10 families.

== See also ==
- Autographa californica
