= GSV =

GSV may refer to:

- Garrison of Sør-Varanger, a military base of the Norwegian Army
- General Systems Vehicle, a class of fictional artificially intelligent starship in The Culture universe of late Scottish author Iain Banks
- Geological Survey of Victoria, now GeoScience Victoria
- Gilbert–Shannon–Varshamov bound
- Girls Sport Victoria, an Australian high school sporting association
- Golden State Valkyries, an American women's basketball team based in San Francisco
- Google Street View
- Gonad specific virus, a sexually transmitted virus specific to the corn earworm moth
- Great saphenous vein
