= Helicoverpa zea nudivirus 2 =

Virus classification
- (unranked): Virus
- Class: Naldaviricetes
- Order: Lefavirales
- Family: Nudiviridae
- Genus: Betanudivirus
- Species: Betanudivirus hezeae

Sexually transmitted virus of corn earworm moths

Helicoverpa zea nudivirus 2 (HzNV-2, Hz-2V, gonad specific virus [GSV], or Heliothis zea nudivirus 2) is an enveloped, rod-shaped, nonoccluded, double stranded DNA (dsDNA) sexually transmitted virus whose natural host is the corn earworm moth. At about 440 by 90 nm, it is the causative agent of a sexually transmitted viral disease for the species. It was originally identified in a colony of corn earworm moths established and maintained in Stoneville, Mississippi, U.S. and was found to be responsible for the sterility of those infected.

The virus does not always cause sterility, though. Many moths are asymptomatic carriers of the virus. Infected female hosts mate much more than those uninfected. With more mating events, the virus spreads to several males. Fertile female hosts may also pass the virus on through their eggs.

HzNV-2 is closely related to HzNV-1; it is likely that HzNV-1 is a variant of HzNV-2 which exists in a persistent state in infected moths. HzNV-2 was discovered in 1995. Originally, symptomatic hosts were described as being "agonadal". Then, the virus was given the name "gonad specific virus". It was later given the name "Helicoverpa zea nudivirus 2" because of the similar physical properties between it and HzNV-1, which had been described about 20 years prior. It is highly unlikely that the common effects of HzNV-2 on their hosts, malformed reproductive tissues causing infertility, would have been selected for establishing an ovarian cell line. It is more likely that those chosen moths were asymptomatic. Their common ancestor is believed to share a common ancestor with baculoviruses, a family of viruses whose natural hosts are decapods, arthropods, Hymenoptera, Diptera, and Lepidoptera.

== Pathology ==
The natural host of HzNV-2 is the corn earworm moth (Helicoverpa zea). The virus is spread to offspring through their mothers' eggs (Vertical transmission) and through mating attempts between adult moths (Horizontal transmission). Infected moths are referred to as either asymptomatic (AS) or agonadal (AG), due to the virus causing larvae to never form functional gonads. HzNV-2 is very common among wild moths, and it is very able to survive in host populations.

=== Asymptomatic carriers ===
Persistent replication of HzNV-2 in insect hosts make asymptomatic (AS), fertile carriers. Unlike baculoviruses, the productive replication of this virus does not kill the hosts. Instead, it causes malformed gonads, sterilizing the hosts. When healthy females mate with infected males, the offspring are infected through the eggs (transovarially). Typically, some of the offspring are infertile while others are infected, AS carriers. Whether or not the offspring is AS or agonadal is dependent on how much viral particle content they receive from their mothers. The amount of virus mothers spread to their children increases over the time of infection.

In fact, most infected, wild female moths are fertile and AS carriers, and infected females account for up to 69% of all wild females. When they mate with sterile, infected moths are still able to spread the virus through mating. After mating, the virus productively replicates inside the females, which makes the viral dose increase on successive oviposition days. These abilities to spread differently through hosts that are both asymptomatic and symptomatic and that spread the virus vertically to offspring and horizontally to mates makes HzNV-2 very fit and able to coexist well in the wild with its host.

=== Symptomatic hosts ===
HzNV-2 is able to change the molecular processes of their hosts. Though infected larvae appear to be very normal, when they emerge from their cocoons as adults, they may be without gonads. This condition is described as being "agonadal". The reproductive systems of both sexes are malformed and appear as a large "Y" shape.

Female hosts infected through vertical transmission often do not develop several reproductive structures, including their ovaries, bursa copulatrix, accessory glands, and spermatheca. In addition, their common and lateral oviducts are malformed and enlarged. Viral replication in female gonads result in hypertrophy of the oviducts and proliferation of the cells making up these tissues. These enlargements appear to begin as early as their last instar as larvae. The lateral oviducts of healthy, adult female moths areone or two cell layers; those of infected female moths have four to eight layers instead. These enlargements may increase virus production. HzNV-2 also causes the formation of a "viral plug" that prolongs their mating behaviors and serves as a source of contamination for males attempting to mate. Infected females also produce five to seven times more sex pheromone than those uninfected and attract two times as many mates. While mating, female moths will continue to call to other males, uncharacteristic of the species. Since the virus can spread horizontally through sex, this transmits it quicker.

Infected males may grow to have small, unfused testes, no seminal vesicles, vas deferencia, or accessory glands. Accessory glands produce pheromonostatic peptide (PSP), which inhibits the amount of mating pheromones females make. Without PSP, female moths continue to attract more partners. The tissues needed for the initiation of copulation and the transfer of reproductive fluids during mating function normally. The lumen of the primary simplex of infected male moths is greatly filled with virus particles that they very likely transmit to healthy females without fertilizing them.

== Genome ==
The genome of HzNV-2 is a circular double-stranded DNA molecule of 231,621 bp, making it the largest dsDNA insect virus. It has a guanine-cytosine content of 41.9%. It contains 376 open reading frames (ORFs) coding more than 60 amino acids. Of the 113 ORFs that are likely to encode proteins, 66 are on the forward strand of DNA, the other 47 on the reverse. All of these are evenly arranged, producing 29 clusters of 1 to 6 ORFs. The average ORF is 1.4 kb in length, though the sizes range from 189 bp and 5.7 kb. The gene density of HzNV-2 is one gene per 2.05 kb with a coding density of 68%.

The HsNV-2 genome shares homology with 16 conserved baculovirus core genes. Since HzNV-1 shares all of these homologous genes with baculovirus genome and four more, it is very likely that HsNV-1 and HzNV-2 have a recent common ancestor and their common ancestor diverged from a common ancestor of the baculoviruses.

75 of the virus' 113 putative genes have poor or no homology to any other known genes, except with genes of HzNV-1. Of the 38 genes with homologues, 6 are involved in DNA replication, 4 in transcription, 5 in nucleic acid metabolism, 3 structural proteins.

=== Comparison to HsNV-1 ===
Both viruses can replicate in cell cultures, though only HzNV-2 can replicate in an insect host. The genomes of HzNV-2 and HzNV-1 are very similar, sharing a 93.5% sequence identity. Of the 113 putative genes, the viruses share 97 that are not overlapping or inverted. There is a 5.1 kb area at 174.7-179.8 kb region of HsNV-2 that has no equivalent in the genome of HzNV-1. In this region of HsNV-2, three ORFs are found: Hz2V008, Hz2V091, and Hz2V092. In total, 14 ORFs identified in HsNV-2 are not found in the HzNV-1 genome. None of which have been determined to share sequence homology with any genes of known function.

=== Genes related to DNA replication and repair ===
The C-terminal region of Hz2V008 has homology with the catalytic domain for integrase and recombinase, which has DNA breaking and rejoining activity. This region of HsNV-2's genome has similarity to the INT_REC_C conserved domain. This domain is related to phage integrase and bacterial and yeast recombinase. It also contains motif cores for DNA binding sites, catalytic residues, the active sites, and topoisomerase. The best similarity to this gene comes from monodon baculovirus and Gryllus bimaculatus nudivirus (GbNV), suggesting a possible common ancestor.

The C-terminal region of Hz2V018 has homology to DNA polymerase. It has great similarity to the Oryctes rhinoceros nudivirus' (OrNV) DNA polymerase and the DNA-dependent DNA polymerase type-B family (POLBc) conserved domain, which is linked with DNA binding, polymerase, and 3'-5' exonuclease activity. This region also contains the well-conserved nucleotide binding motif, K(3x)NS(x)YG(2x)G, at 842-853 aa and the polymerase catalytic motif, YxDTD, at 892-897 aa.

The 256 aa long N-terminal region of Hz2V029 is similar to the C-terminal region of the SbcC conserved domain, a prokaryotic ortholog of the rad50 gene of humans which has ATPase activity and is a critical part of DNA double-strand break repair. In totality, the gene is 823 aa long. This gene is most similar to the GbNV putative desmoplakin and Spodoptera frugiperda ascovirus 1a SbcC/ATPase domain.

The C-terminal region of Hz2V038 is similar to a poxvirus D5 protein and it has homology DNA helicase, essential for virus replication. The most homologous gene is found in the Ectoropis oblique nucleopolyhedrovirus (NPV).

Hz2V070 has the most similarity to the xeroderma pigmentosum G (XPG) enzyme, which is related to other enzymes playing roles in nucleotide-excision repair and transcription-coupled repair of oxidative DNA damage.

=== Genes related to RNA transcription ===
Hz2V028 shows homology with the baculovirus very late expression factor 1 (vlf-1), necessary for burst expression of the genes polyhedrin and p10. Vlf-1 is a transcription initiation factor that recognizes and binds to DTAAG, a promoter motif of baculovirus very late genes, though it is likely Hz2V028 recognizes a different motif.

Hz2V040 is closest in similarity to Spodoptera furugiperda NPV lef-5. It has characteristic zinc ribbon motif for DNA binding, and it likely has transcriptional initiation activity.

Hz2V043 most likely plays a role in mRNA 5'-capping and is likely able to from stable enzyme-nucleotide monophosphate complexes for guanylation, like GbNV lef-4.

Hz2V051 is most similar to GbNV lef-8, which helps encode one of the main catalytic subunits of the baculovirus RNA polymerase.

Hz2V063 shows homology to the N-terminal region of the nudivirus and baculovirus LEF-9. It may, then, have a part in RNA polymerase.

=== Genes related to virus entry ===
Hz2V026 is most similar to GbNV pif-2 and Autographa californica multiple nucleopolyhedrovirus (AcMPV), and it may form disulfide bonds and be a structural component of the occlusion-derived virus envelope. zz Hz2V053 is a homologue of baculovirus pif-3 and GbNV pif-3. It contains an N-terminal transmembrane domain.

Hz2V082 is a homologue of the GbNV pif-1 gene and is very similar to the Spodoptera littoralis NPV (SlNPV). It is likely responsible for oral infectivity through directly binding the virus particle to host cells.

Hz2V106 shows homology with baculovirus p74 and likely mediates the specific binding of the virus particle to host cells by aiding the formation of disulfide bonds inside its C-terminal transmembrane's membrane anchoring domain.

=== Genes related to nucleic acid metabolism ===
Hz2V035 is most similar to Bombyx mori thymidlylate synthase and is likely involved in the synthesis of dTMP precursors from dUTP.

Hz2V047 and Hz2V065 are most similar to SlNPV sibonucleotide reductase large (RR1) and small subunit (RR2) respectively. RR1 and RR2 help reduce ribonucleotides to deoxyribonucleotides in order to produce precursors of DNA.

Hz2V066 is most homologous with the Bombyx mori serine hydroxymethyltransferase (SHMT), which catalyzes the reversible interconversion of serine and glycine with tetrahydrofolate.

Hz2V067 is most similar to Drosophila melanogaster deoxynucleotide kinase (dNK). dNK catalyzes the phosphorylation of deoxyribonucleosides to yield corresponding monophosphates and it is a key enzyme involved in salvaging deoxyribonucleosides.

Hz2V069 encodes a protein 350 aa long and is most homologous with Culex quinquefasciatus dUTPase. dUTPase helps minimize the misincoporation of uracil into virus DNA during replication, and it may be a key enzyme in HzNV-2 replication and latency in asymptomatic carriers.

Hz2V093 is similar to HzNV-1 ORF65, and it may play a role in RNA capping while not being essential for virus replication.

Hz2V111 is a homologue of Heliothis virescens dihydrofolate reductase (DHFR) and to herpesvirus DHFR. DHFR reduces dihydrofolate into tetrahydrofolate, which is necessary for DNA synthesis to take place.

=== Genes related to structural proteins ===
Hz2V062 is most similar to GbNV odv-e56.

Hz2V089 is homologous to baculovirus vp91.

Hz2V108 is a homologue of MBV 38K protein gene, which is crucial for nucleocapsid assembly.

=== Auxiliary and undefined genes ===
Hz2V007 is very similar to the Bombyx mori carboxylesterase (COE) and, to a lesser degree, Anopheles gambiae juvenile hormone esterase (JHE). This high similarity may mean that HzNV-2 can control the physiology of infected hosts through the regulation of Juvenile hormone levels and the level of gene expression occurring at different stages of their development. In addition, this gene more closely resembles a host gene than a viral gene.

Hz2V012 and Hz2V015 encode inhibitor of apoptosis (IAP) homologues.

Hz2V023 shows homology to the major facilitator superfamily (MFS), specifically Aedes aegypti adenylate cyclase. MFS is a group of transporter genes found exclusively in living organisms and this virus. They code for carrier proteins involved in uptaking and effluxing small molecules, particularly sugar and drugs respectively. This gene more closely resembles host genes than viral genes. In fact, an MFS gene has never before been found in a viral genome; it is found exclusively in living species genomes. The protein it encodes for likely facilitates the enhanced metabolism necessary for the cell proliferation in the infected hosts' reproductive tissues

Hz2V034 is relatively similar to the guanosine monophosphate kinase (GMPK) and most homologous with the hypothetical protein of monodon baculovirus. GMPK transfers the terminal phosphate group of ATP and GMP in order to make ADP and GDP, a critical step in the biosynthesis of GTP.

Hz2V039 has homology with the baculovirus 19K protein gene (AcMNPV ORF 96) and is most homologous with GbNV ORF 87.

Hz2V068 encodes a zinc-dependent matrix metalloprotease (ZnMc_MMP) and is most similar to Acyrthosiphon pisum MMP. This gene most more closely resembles host genes than viral genes. It likely synthesizes zinc and calcium dependent enzymes to be proenzymes in connective tissues. MMPs are important in cellular differentiation, morphogenesis, and pericellular proteolysis of the extracellular matrix and other cell surface molecules.

Hz2V096 is homologous to AcMNPV ORF81 (ac81) but is most similar to GbNV ORF14. Its function is unknown, but ac81 is considered a baculovirus core gene

Hz2V099 is similar to a prokaryotic acetylesterase (Aes), a member of the esterase/lipase family that plays a role in the control of a transcriptional activator.

Hz2V110 is homologous to serine/threonine protein kinase (S_TPK). S_TPK catalyzes phosphorylation of serine and threonine residues, which is important to cellular function regulation, particularly the phosphorylation of protein involved in signal transduction.

The combination of Hz2V007, Hz2V023, and Hz2V068 may account for the malformation of infected tissues and the unique pathology of the virus.
