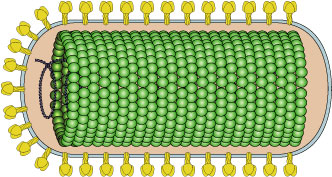
- Schematic drawing

Virus classification
- (unranked): Virus
- Class: Naldaviricetes
- Order: Lefavirales
- Family: Nudiviridae

Genera
- See text

= Nudivirus =

Nudiviridae

Family of viruses

Nudiviruses are a genus of arthropod viruses that constitute the family Nudiviridae. Insects and marine crustaceans serve as natural hosts to this family of viruses. Nudiviruses are double-stranded DNA viruses, with their genome notably ranging from 130 to 140 kilobases in length. There are 29 species in this family, assigned to 6 genera. Diseases associated with this family include: death in larvae, and chronic disease in adults.

== Taxonomy ==
The family Nudiviridae contains the following genera:

- Alphanudivirus
- Betanudivirus
- Deltanudivirus
- Epsilonnudivirus
- Gammanudivirus
- Zetanudivirus

== Classification History ==
During their first discovery, nudiviruses were classified as a subgroup in the Baculoviridae family. Originally it was assumed that nudiviruses were nooccluded baculoviruses. In 2007, the genus Nudivirus was proposed to include viruses similar to the Oryctes rhinoceros virus. In 2013, Nudiviruses were classified as the family Nudiviridae. Nudiviruses are assigned to the class Naldaviricetes that contains three other large dsDNA virus families: Baculoviridae, Hytrosaviridae and Nimaviridae.

== Species ==
Nudiviruses infect only insects and marine crustaceans.

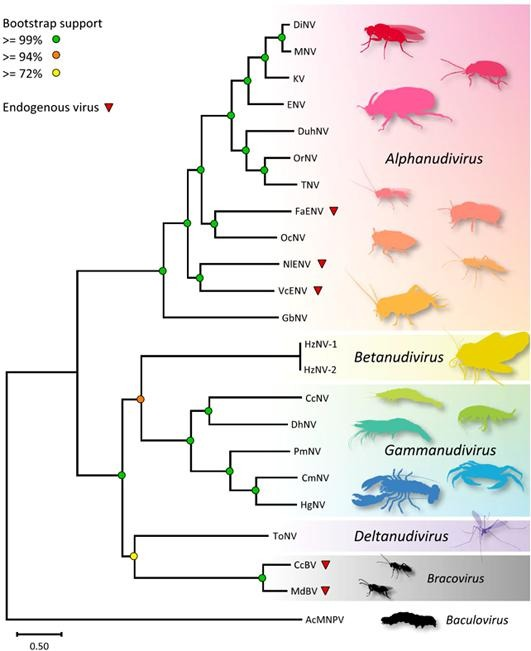
- Nudivirus Phylogenetic Tree
  Drosophila innubila nudivirus (DiNV) – Drosophila innubila (Diptera)
- Gryllus bimaculatus nudivirus (GbNV) – black cricket (Teleogryllus commodus)
- Heliothis zea nudivirus 1 (HzNV-1) – cotton bollworm
- Helicoverpa zea nudivirus 2 (HzNV-2 formally known as GSV)– cotton bollworm
- Homarus gammarus nudivirus (HgNV)- European lobster (Homarus gammarus)
- Oryctes rhinoceros nudivirus (OrNV)– rhinoceros beetle Oryctes rhinoceros
- Penaeus monodon nudivirus (PmNV) – Black tiger shrimp
- Dikerogammarus haemobaphes nudivirus (DhNV) – an amphipod crustacean (Dikerogammarus haemobaphes)
- Menippe mercenaria nudivirus (MmNV) – Florida stone crab
- Callinectes sapidus nudivirus (CsNV)- Blue crab
- Diabrotica undecimpunctata howardi nudivirus (DuhNV) – Spotted cucumber beetle
- Tomelloso virus (TV) – Drosophila melanogaster
- Osmia cornuta nudivirus (OcNV) – European orchard bee
- Crangon crangon nudivirus (CcNV) – Brown Shrimp
- Carcinus maenas bacilliform nudivirus (CmNV) – European Green Crab
- Tipula oleracea nudivirus (ToNV) – Marsh Crane Fly
- Carcinus maenas bacilliform nudivirus (CmNV) –
- Faxonius propinquus nudivirus (FpNV) – Northern Clear Water Crayfish
- Faxonius virilis nudivirus (FvNV) – Virile Crayfish
- Faxonius rusticus nudivirus (FrNV) – Rusty Crayfish

== Virus Transmission ==
Transmission of nudiviruses occurs horizontally by feeding, mating and vertically from mother to offspring. Infections can be lethal for the larvae and can possibly reduce the fitness of the host by reducing offspring production and survival among adults.

== Structure and life cycle ==
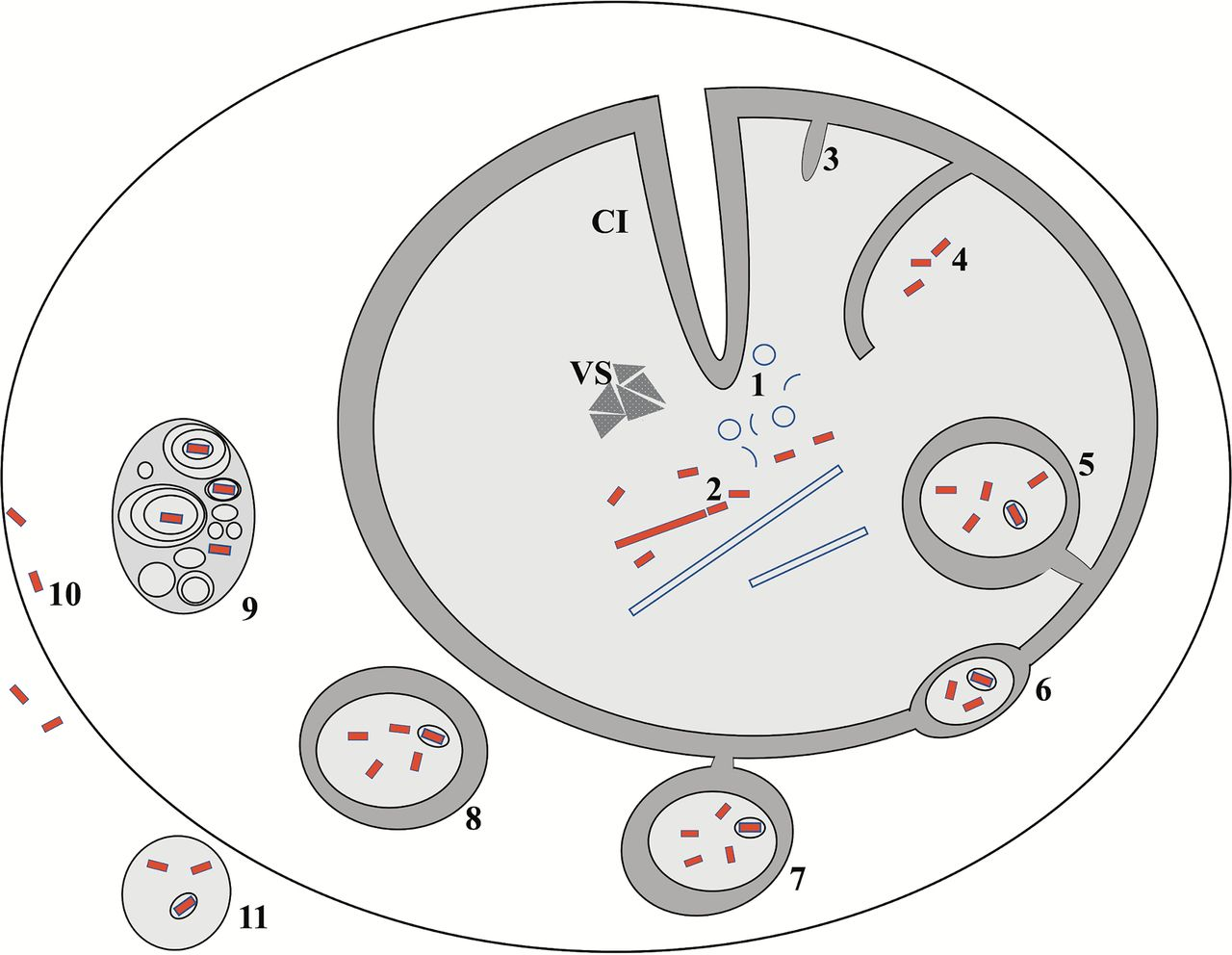
Nudiviridae replication cycle

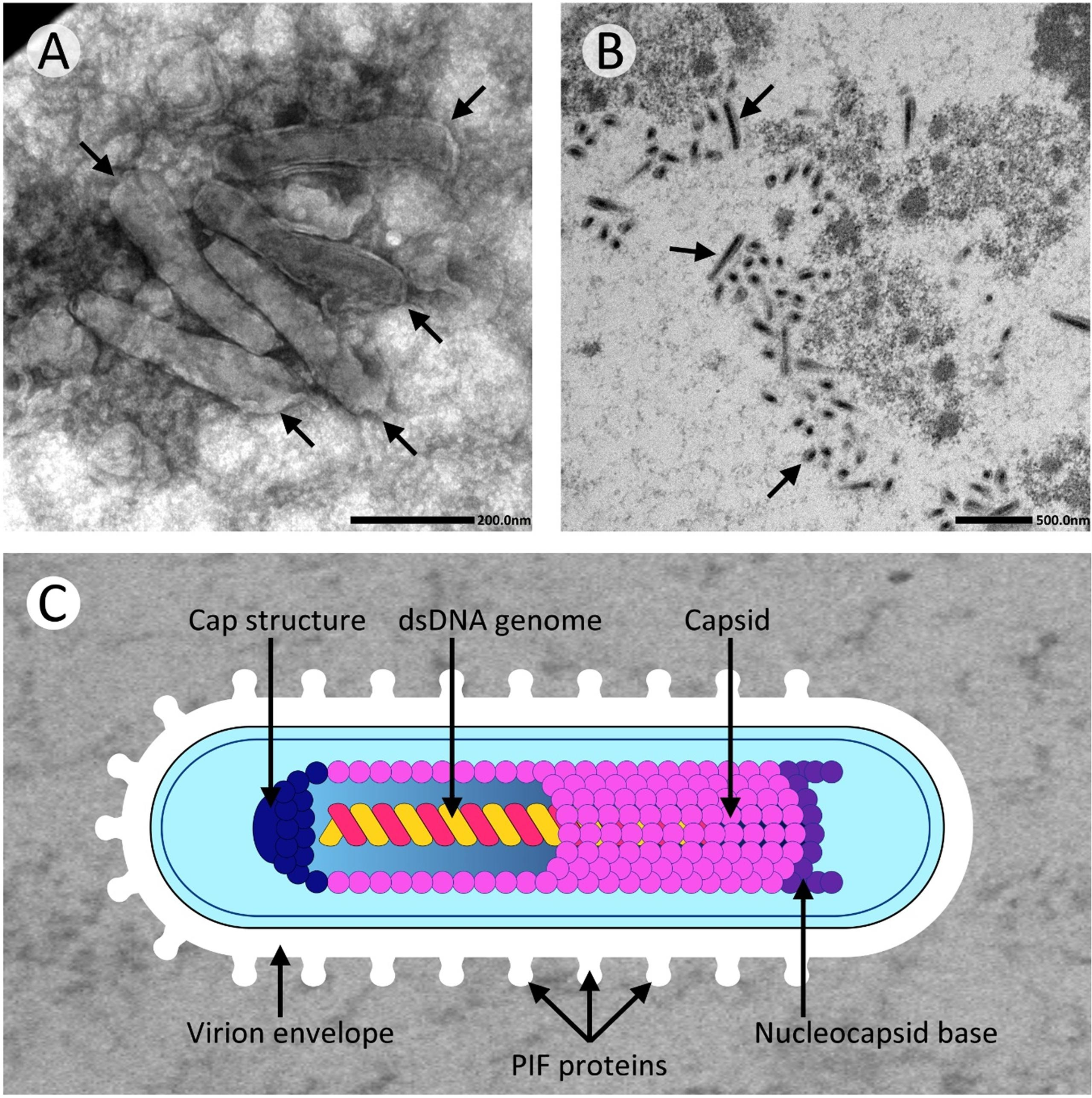
Virion structures of the betanudivirus HzNV-1.

Nudiviruses are double stranded DNA viruses, characterized by their rod shape. Their virions are made of a single nucleocapsid surrounded by an envelope and range from 30 nm to 120 nm in length. They replicate in the nucleus of infected host cells and in some parasitoid wasp species, a nudivirus genome, in proviral form, is integrated into the wasp genome and produces virus like particles called polydnaviruses that are injected into lepidopteran larvae and are thought to facilitate parasitization of the larvae.

Nudiviruses have localized infection and are associated with specific cell pathogenesis and varies among species. Vesicles containing virions have been observed for HzNV-2 and OrNV and aid in infecting subsequent cells. Virions sexually transmitted during mating, like Hznv-2, target reproductive tissues, cause the malformation of reproductive tissues in infected adult Helicoverpa Zea. In cells, enveloped and non enveloped particles were observed in the nucleus and have been found to successfully replicate in infect ovarian moth cell lines, but did not replicate in fat body cells. In OrNV, replication occurs in the nucleus in midgut and fat body cells. In TpNV, replication occurs in the nucleus of the salvalary glands. The specific cell localization is a distinctive characteristic that differentiates nudivruses from baculoviruses.

Three species form Occlusion bodies (OBs), ToNV, PmNV and OrNV. In PmNV OBs are transmitted orally and are sensitive to acid conditions. Host proteins may be involved in the formation of nudiviral OBs.

Currently, there is not a general life cycle established for nudiviruses.

== Genome ==
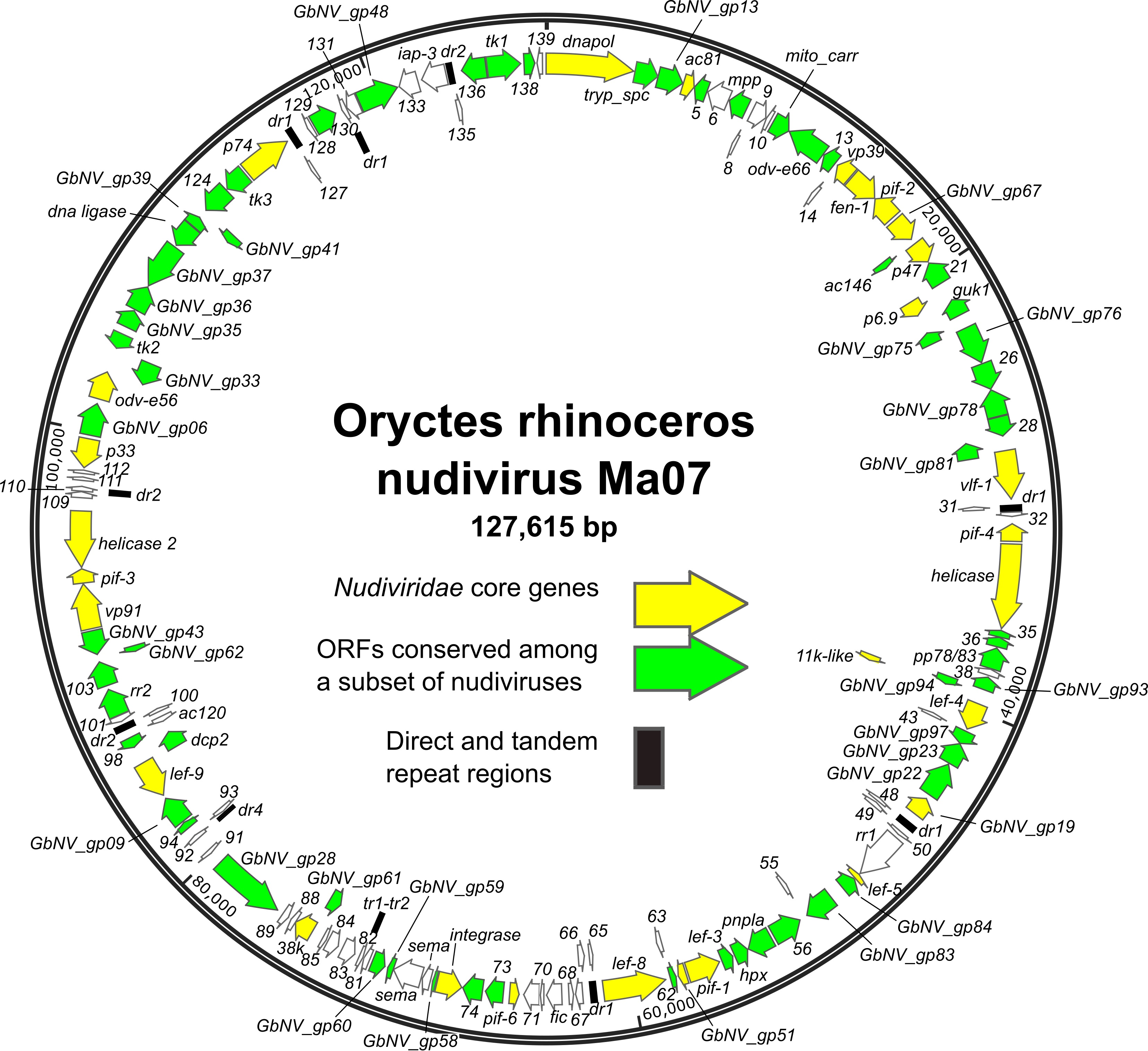
Genome map of Oryctes rhinoceros nudivirus (click on image to enlarge it)

Gene content comparison and phylogenetic analyses show that nudiviruses share 20 core genes with baculoviruses and form a monophyletic sister group with them. Fossil calibration estimate this association arose 100 million years ago(Mya), while the last common ancestor of nudiviruses and baculoviruses existed approximately 312 Mya. Baculoviruses and nudiviruses differ in gene content, genome organization, cytopathology, infection of adults and most likely in host range. The 20 core genes common in both baculoviruses and nudiviruses are involved in RNA transcription, DNA replication, virion structural components and many other functions. Gene content and sequence similarity suggest that the nudiviruses GbNV, HzNV-1, and OrNV form a monophyletic group of nonoccluded double-stranded DNA viruses, which separated from the baculovirus lineage before this radiated into dipteran-, hymenopteran-, and lepidopteran-specific clades of occluded nucleopolyhedroviruses and granuloviruses. The coding sequences vary among the nudivirus species and encode between 87 and 154 proteins depending on the species.

The order of the genes in the genomes of the viruses found in nudiviridae are poorly conserved.

There are 32 core genes conserved among nudiviruses that are involved in various viral functions.

- Transcription: lef-4, lef-5, lef-8, lef-9, p47
- Infectivity: pif-0, pif-1, pif-2, pif-3, pif-4, pif-5, pif-6
- Package/Assembly/Morphogenesis: vip91, 38k, p33, p6.9, vlf-1, vp39, ac81
- DNA replication/repair/recombination: dnapol, helicase, helicase-2, integrase, fen-1
- Nucleotide metabolism: tk1, tk2, tk3
- Unknown function: GbNV gp19-like, GbNV gp51-like, GbNV gp58-like, GbNV gp67-like, 11K-like.

The conservation of the 8 pif proteins, suggest the mode of infection for nudiviruses is conserved.

== Tandem Direct Repeat Regions ==
Tandem direct repeats (Drs) are a common feature found in nudiviruses. These regions are characterized by their imperfect palindromic core. The number direct repeat regions vary among nudivirus species and hypothesized to function like baculovirus Homologous regions. These regions can play a role in replication and can act as enhancers. The drs identified in various nudivirus genomes have no homology to each other and are present in both coding and noncoding regions.

OrNV: 14 repeat regions 30-84 bp in length with varying AT%

GbNV: 14 repeat regions 11 to 42 bp in length up to 96% AT rich.

ToNv: 5 repeat regions 160-262 bp in length.

HzNV-1: 6 repeat regions 24- 81 bp in length.

HgNV: 7 repeat regions 58.8 to188 bp in length.

PmNV: 10 repeat regions.

== Genome integration ==
Some nudiviruses have the ability to integrate into their host genome, like FaENV, NiENV, VcENV that are permently integrated into their host and HzNV-1 that integrates as part of an latent infection. A latent HzNV-1 infection can be reactivated generate a lytic viral infection The ability of these viruses to maintain their replication after integration distinguishes them their baculovirus ancestor.

== Defense mechanisms ==
In many organisms, apoptosis can be regarded as an early defense mechanism against viral infection. Some viral genes allow the cell to survive for longer while producing more virions; Heliothis zea Nudivirus 1 (HzNV-1 or Hz-1 virus), a nudivirus with a broad host range, has been shown to block an induced-apoptosis gene (hhi1). A functional anti-apoptosis gene, (Hz-iap2), has been found to suppress the hhi1 gene which can cause the cell to die. A second inhibitor gene (Ac-iap2) to the hhi1 gene has been also discovered, but its function is still uncertain.

== Nudivirus encoded microRNAs ==
Micro RNAs (miRNAs) are small non-coding RNA molecules that play important roles in the regulation of genes in eukaryotic organisms. Virus encoded miRNAs are commonly reported in DNA viruses and several nudiviruses have been reported to encode miRNAs. The first reported nudivirus encoded miRNA was from Heliothis zea nudivirus-1 which was shown to regulate virus latency. Two other viruses Drosophila innubila nudivirus and Oryctes rhinoceros nudivirus have also been reported to encode miRNA molecules from transcriptomic studies, however the role of these miRNAs and their role in virus-host interactions is yet to be experimentally determined.

== Utilization for Pest Control ==
In the southwest Pacific islands, OrNV has been shown to be an effective biocontrol agent against the palm pest, the coconut rhinoceros beetle.

== Etymology ==
The word "nudivirus" comes from the Latin nudus, which means naked and virus, poison. Naked refers to the fact that most do not have the dense protein bodies which surround baculoviruses. However occluded nudiviruses, with such protein bodies, such as those of Tipula oleracea and Penaeus monodon have been characterized.
