= White spot syndrome =

Whispovirus

Virus classification
- (unranked): Virus
- Class: Naldaviricetes
- Order: incertae sedis
- Family: Nimaviridae
- Genus: Whispovirus

Species
- White spot syndrome virus

Viral infection of penaeid shrimp

White spot syndrome (WSS) is a viral infection of penaeid shrimp. The disease is highly lethal and contagious, killing shrimp quickly. Outbreaks of this disease have wiped out the entire populations of many shrimp farms within a few days, in places throughout the world.

White spot syndrome virus (WSSV) is the lone virus of the genus Whispovirus (white spot), which is the only genus in the family Nimaviridae. It is responsible for causing white spot syndrome in a wide range of crustacean hosts.

The disease is caused by a family of related viruses subsumed as the white spot syndrome baculovirus complex and the disease caused by them as white spot syndrome.

== History ==
The first reported epidemic due to this virus is from Taiwan in 1992. Reports of losses due to white spot disease came from China in 1993 where it led to a virtual collapse of the shrimp farming industry. This was followed by outbreaks in Japan and Korea in the same year, Thailand, India and Malaysia in 1994, and by 1996 it had severely affected East Asia and South Asia. In late 1995, it was reported in the United States, 1998 in Central and South America, 1999 in Mexico, in 2000 in the Philippines, and in 2011 in Saudi Arabia.

In 2007, a government study in Queensland, Australia, established that the disease was present in almost 90% of supermarket-sold prawns. In 2016, Australian Government investigations found over 85% of imported prawns had the disease and contemplated prosecution against several importers. It was suggested that some importers had evaded biosecurity inspection and/or that lax inspection processes by Biosecurity Australia allowed the disease to go undetected. It was claimed that the Australian prawn industry was not advised about the white spot disease in case the publicity might jeopardise any prosecutions. In November 2016, the virus was detected on a prawn farm on the Logan River in south-east Queensland, for the first time in the wild in Australia. The source was not known, but at that point aquaculture farmers were sure that the disease could be eradicated, and not spread to wild prawns. However, by March 2021 it was apparent that not only had it spread to wild prawns and small crabs in the Logan River, south of Brisbane, but it was also being detected in Deception Bay and was widespread in Moreton Bay, in the Brisbane area, far away from the original infection on the prawn farms. In 2021, the Australian Government was reviewing its import requirements, and farmers and fishers were urging Australian biosecurity laws to include a requirement that imported prawns should be cooked.

== Virology ==
White spot syndrome virus is a species of virus in the genus Whispovirus, in the family Nimaviridae. It is the only species in this family.

=== Virion structure ===
WSSV is a rod-shaped, double-stranded, DNA virus, and the size of the enveloped viral particles have been reported to be 240–380 nm long and 70–159 nm in diameter and nucleocapsid core is 120–205 nm long and 95–165 nm in diameter. The virus has an outer lipid bilayer membrane envelope, sometimes with a tail-like appendage at one end of the virion. The nucleocapsid consists of 15 conspicuous vertical helices located along the long axis; each helix has two parallel striations, composed of 14 globular capsomers, each of which is 8 nm in diameter.

Genus	Structure	Symmetry	Capsid	Genomic arrangement	Genomic segmentation
Whispovirus	Ovoid		Enveloped	Circular	Monopartite

=== Genome ===
The complete DNA sequence of the WSSV genome has been assembled into a circular sequence of 292,967 bp. It encodes 531 putative open reading frames.

One of the proteins, WSSV449, has some similarity to host protein Tube and can function like Tube by activating the NF-κB pathway.

=== Lifecycle ===
Viral replication is nuclear; DNA-templated transcription is its method. The virus infects an unusually wide host range of crustaceans. Transmission of the virus is mainly through oral ingestion and water-borne routes in farms (horizontal transmission) and vertical transmission (from infected mother prawns) in the case of shrimp hatcheries. The virus is present in the wild stocks of shrimp, especially in the coastal waters adjacent to shrimp-farming regions in Asian countries, but mass mortalities of wild shrimp are yet to be observed.

Genus	Host details	Tissue tropism	Entry details	Release details	Replication site	Assembly site	Transmission
Whispovirus	Crustaceans	Ectoderm; mesoderm	Unknown	Unknown	Nuclear	Nuclear	Contact

== Clinical ==
The virus has a wide host range. While shrimp can survive with the virus for extended periods of time, factors such as stress can cause the outbreak of WSS. The disease is highly virulent and leads to mortality rates of 100% within days in the case of cultured penaeid shrimps. Most of the cultured penaeid shrimps (Penaeus monodon, Marsupenaeus japonicus, Litopenaeus vannamei, and Fenneropenaeus indicus) are natural hosts of the virus. Several nonpenaeid shrimp were also found to be severely infected during experimental challenges. Many crustaceans such as crabs (Scylla spp., Portunus spp.), spiny lobsters (Panulirus spp.), crayfish (Astacus spp.', Cherax spp.) and freshwater shrimp (Macrobrachium spp.) are reported to be infected with variable severities depending on the lifestage of the host and presence of external stressors (temperature, salinity, bacterial diseases, pollutants).

Clinical signs of WSS include a sudden reduction in food consumption, lethargy, loose cuticle and often reddish discolouration, and the presence of white spots of 0.5 to 2.0 mm in diameter on the inside surface of the carapace, appendages, and cuticle over the abdominal segments.

== Pathology ==
In the host, WSSV infects a wide variety of cells from ectodermal and mesodermal origin. Histological changes are seen in the gill epithelium, antennal gland, haematopoeitic tissue, nervous tissue, connective tissue, and intestinal epithelial tissue. Infected cells have prominent intranuclear occlusions that initially stain eosinophilic, but become basophilic with age; hypertrophied nuclei with chromatin margination; and cytoplasmic clearing. Pathogenesis involves widespread tissue necrosis and disintegration.

White spots on the shell of infected shrimp under scanning electron microscope appear as large, dome-shaped spots on the carapace measuring 0.3 to 3.0 mm in diameter. Smaller white spots of 0.02 to 0.10 mm appear as linked spheres on the cuticle surface. Chemical composition of the spots is similar to the carapace, calcium forming 80–90% of the total material, and may have derived from abnormalities of the cuticular epidermis.

Several biochemical changes have been reported after infection with this virus: glucose consumption and plasma lactate concentration increase, glucose 6 phosphate dehydrogenase activity increases, and triglyceride concentration decreases. The voltage-dependent anion channel of the mitochondrion is also upregulated.

== Diagnosis ==
Infection with WSSV differs from other described penaeid infections yellowhead virus (YHV) and infectious hypodermal and hematopoietic necrosis virus (IHHNV) in the described histological findings, as YHV has a reduced tissue specificity, infecting only the intestinal epithelial tissues and IHHNV causes intranuclear occlusions that stain eosinophilic, but do not change over the course of the infection.

Rapid and specific diagnosis of the virus can be accomplished using nested or quantitative PCR.

== Treatment ==
No treatments for WSS are available.

== Prevention ==
A large number of disinfectants are widely used in shrimp farms and hatcheries to prevent an outbreak. Stocking of uninfected shrimp seeds and rearing them away from environmental stressors with extreme care to prevent contamination are useful management measures. Site selection may be one of the most crucial in preventing WSS. Shrimp farmed in areas with relatively low temperature fluctuations and at water temperatures greater than 29°C had increased resistance to WSSV.
