= Hytrosaviridae =

- Schematic drawing

Virus classification
- (unranked): Virus
- Class: Naldaviricetes
- Order: Lefavirales
- Family: Hytrosaviridae

Genera
- Glossinavirus; Muscavirus

Family of viruses

Hytrosaviridae is a family of double-stranded DNA viruses that infect insects. The name is derived from Hytrosa, sigla from the Greek Hypertrophia for 'hypertrophy' and 'sialoadenitis' for 'salivary gland inflammation.'

== Description ==
The viruses in this family are non occluded, enveloped, rod-shaped virions measuring 500–1,000 nanometers (nm) in length and 50–80 nm in diameter. The virions contain a thin, dense central nucleocapsid that encases the DNA-protein core. The nucleocapsid core is surrounded by an amorphous proteinaceous tegument layer. The outer surface of the virions is studded with helical polymeric structure composed of virally-encoded and host-derived protein dimers. The virions contain at least 35 polypeptides which range in size from 10 to 200 kilodaltons.

The genome is a supercoiled, circular double stranded DNA (dsDNA) molecule ranging in size from 120 to 190 kilobases with 108-174 putative non-overlapping genes that are equally distributed over the genome in unidirectional clusters. The G+C ratio varies between 28% and 44%.

Species in this family cause overt salivary gland hypertrophy symptoms in dipteran adults. Infection and replication in non-salivary gland cells induce partial in tsetse flies and complete shutdown of vitellogenesis in the houseflies.

Replication occurs in the nucleus of secretory epithelial cells of the salivary gland. The viral DNA synthesis and transcription occurs within the nuclear replication complexes. Replication involved temporal expression of immediate early, early and late genes. The nucleocapsids exit the nucleus into the cytoplasm through the nuclear pore complex, after which they associate with the Golgi apparatus that culminates in cytoplasmic envelopment and virion assembly.

Transmission is either horizontally (per os) through feeding or vertically (transovarially) from mother to offspring. Mechanical transmission (trans-cuticular though wounds) has been suggested in the houseflies.

== Taxonomy ==
Two genera, each containing one species, are assigned to this family:

- Glossinavirus
  - Glossinavirus glopallidipedis, the exemplar virus of which is Glossina pallidipes salivary gland hypertrophy virus (GpSGHV)
- Muscavirus
  - Muscavirus musdomesticae, the exemplar virus of which is Musca domestica salivary gland hypertrophy virus (MdSGHV)

== Host Range ==
- Glossina pallidipes. This is the natural host of Glossina pallidipes salivary gland hypertrophy virus (GpSGHV), in which the virus predominantly causes chronic asymptomatic (covert) SGH infections. GpSGHV is highly specific to Glossina species. There is no available evidence for GpSGHV infections or replication in heterologous host species such as the housefly. The susceptibility of the tsetse fly to GpSGHV infections differ widely in different Glossina species, of which Glossina pallidipes is the most susceptible. Up to 15 different GpSGHV haplotypes with varying prevalence rates have been reported in the wild populations of tsetse flies in East, Central and West Africa.
- Musca domestica. The common housefly is the natural host of Musca domestica salivary gland hypertrophy virus (MdSGHV), in which the virus causes only acute symptomatic (overt) SGH infections. Under laboratory setting, MdSGHV can infect other insects, including the obligate hemato phagous stable flies (Stomoxys calcitrans), the autumn housefly (Musca autumnalis), and the larvae predator of the housefly, the black dump fly (Hydrotaea aenescens). However, MdSGHV does not induce overt SGH symptoms in hosts other than the housefly, but it does significantly affect ovarian development and cause mortalities in some of the muscids such as the stable fly and dump fly.
- Merodon equestris. The hytrosavirus infecting this phytophagous syrphid fly is yet to be characterized.

Morphologically and symptomologically similar virus to SGHVs has been reported to cause SGH symptoms in the male accessory gland filaments of the solitary braconid wasp, Diachasmimorpha longicuadata Ashmed (Hymenoptera. Braconidae), which suggests existence of other Hytrosaviridae family members.

== Virology ==
Prevalence of this virus is high (80%) in Glossina pallidipes. Within the housefly populations, MdSGHV induces variable rates of overt SGH symptoms (0-40%), which is related to the fly's seasonal densities at various sampling sites.

== Pathogenesis and Tissue Tropism ==
Hytrosaviruses (SGHVs) induce similar gross pathology (SGH symptoms) in the salivary glands of their respective adult insect hosts, but the cytopathogies are distinct for each of the two known genera (Glossinavirus and Muscavirus). Both pairs of the salivary gland tissue are equally affected (swollen up to four times their normal sizes) with the enlargement extending the entire lengths of the distal regions of the salivary glands. Infections of tissues other than the salivary glands is associated with various pathologies such as reproductive dysfunctions, infertility in females and distorted mating behaviors.

=== Pathogenesis in the Salivary Glands ===
GpSGHV causes salivary gland hyperplasia in the infected tsetse flies, i.e. only the cytoplasmic but not the nuclear compartment of the glands are enlarged. However, the hyperplastic salivary gland cells are capable of dividing. This pathology is thought to be due to the virus-induced reprogramming of the differentiated salivary gland cells. Overall, the induction of overt SGH symptoms is typically the exemption rather than the rule. It is only under some unknown conditions that the asymptomatic infection state is triggered to the symptomatic infection state. When GpSGHV is artificially inoculated (intrahemocoelic) into adult stages of the tsetse fly Glossina pallidipes, overt SGH symptoms develop in the F1 offsprings produced by the injected mothers, but not in the parental generation. MdSGHV induces salivary gland hypertrophy in the housefly, i.e. both the cytoplasmic and nuclear compartments of the salivary gland tissue proliferate, but are incapable of dividing. When MdSGHV suspensions are artificially infected into adult houseflies, the virus induces overt SGH symptoms in 100% of the infected flies within three days post infection. Adult housefly develops increased resistance to MdSGHV infections with age, which is partially attributed to the development of the PM barrier in the fly's midguts.

=== Pathogenesis in non-Salivary Gland Tissues ===
Infections of non-salivary gland tissues in the tsetse flies by GpSGHV is associated with testicular degeneration, ovarian abnormalities, severe necrosis, degeneration of germinaria, and a reduction of the fly's development, survival and fecundity. Infections of the milk glands cause necrosis and depletion of the milk reservoir organelles.

In the housefly, MdSGHV in non-salivary gland tissues blocks the production of sesquiterpenoids, which in turn induces complete shutdown of vitellogenesis. The ovaries of viremic housefly females become arrested at the pre-vitellogenic stages. MdSGHV induces behavioral alterations in infected females, which refuse to copulate with either healthy or viremic males.

=== Viral Latency ===
The asymptomatic GpSGHV infection state represents either a sub-lethal persistence or latency. Host's RNA interference (RNAi) machineries such as the small interfering RNA (siRNA) and micro RNA (miRNA) pathways have been implicated in keeping GpSGHV infections under control.

== Similarities with other Virus Taxa ==
Structurally, hytrosaviruses are similar to members of other arthropod-infecting virus families such as Baculoviridae, Nudiviridae and Nimaviridae. Hytrosaviruses share 12 of the 38 core genes that have been described in baculoviruses, nudiviruses, nimaviruses and some bracoviruses. Some of the structural and genomic features shared between hytrosaviruses and other large, dsDNA viruses include the possession of enveloped, rod-shaped virions, circular dsDNA genomes and replication in the nucleus of infected cells. However, hytrosaviruses differ functionally with baculoviruses by the lack of occlusion bodies and lower lethality.

The viral DNA polymerase encoded is type B, which is present and conserved in all large dsDNA viruses. At the amino acid level, the best match of the DNA polB of hytrosaviruses is to the DNA polB found in the Alcelaphine gammaherpesvirus. Based on the DNA polB gene, hytrosaviruses relate more closely with invertebrate viruses with large linear dsDNA compared to viruses with circular dsDNA genomes. Some of the linear dsDNA viruses that cluster together with hytrosaviruses include members of families Herpesviridae (120-240 kp), Iridoviridae (140-303 bp), Poxviridae (130–375 kb), Phycodnaviridae (100–560 kb) and Mimiviridae (1200 kb). Hytrosaviruses encode homologs to the core and highly conserved oral infectivity factor (PIF) genes found in other dsDNA viruses (PIFs o/P74, 1,2 and 3), and occlusion-derived virus (ODV) envelope of epidopteran baculoviruses (OVD-E66). Also found in hytrosaviruses are homologs to some of the subunits of the DNA-dependent RNA polymerase (DdRp) complex found in baculoviruses and nudivuses. The DdRp complex components present in the hytrosaviruses include the late expression factors 4, 5, 8 and 9 (LEF-4, LEF-5, LEF-8 and LEF-9).

== Diagnosis and Management of Hytrosavirus Infections ==
In mass rearing facilities, infections of tsetse flies by hytrosavirus causes reduction in colony productivity, which can cause collapse of the colonies. The virus is introduced into the mass rearing facilities from asymptomatic, field-collected materials, or material derived from already existing colonies, that are used to establish new or replenish existing colonies. The virus is then spread and maintained in the colonies through vertical transmission. Unknown factors (e.g. stress or genetic) can trigger expression of overt SGH symptoms, which culminate in fly mortalities, reduced fecundity and eventual colony collapse. There are no obvious external clinical signs for hytrosavirus infections. The hytrosavirus infecting the tsetse flies can be diagnosed using a simple, sensitive and reliable non-destructive PCR-based assay, which allows the screening of the virus in individual live flies. Hytrosavirus infections in mass-reared tsetse flies can be effectively managed by an integrated approach involving a "clean feeding system" (CFS), which is based on strict sanitation, regular and routing monitoring of viral infections and the occurrence of overt SGH symptoms. The CFS can be combined with supplementation of bloodmeals with antiviral drugs such as valacyclovir, which are administered at low doses that are non-detrimental to the fly's DNA synthesis. When administered, the antiviral drug is converted into active metabolites by the virally-encoded thymidylate synthase. The active metabolites subsequently block viral replication resulting in the reduction of viral titers and shedding.
