= Naldaviricetes =

Virus classification
- (unranked): Virus
- Class: Naldaviricetes

Subtaxa
- Order: Lefavirales; Baculoviridae; Filamentoviridae; Hytrosaviridae; Nudiviridae; Nimaviridae

Class of viruses

Naldaviricetes is a class of large double-stranded DNA viruses that infect arthropods. These viruses share a set of homologous genes that encode per os infectivity factors (PIFs), which are essential for oral infection of insect hosts. The class currently includes four recognized families — Baculoviridae, Nudiviridae, Hytrosaviridae, and Nimaviridae — three of which (Baculoviridae, Nudiviridae, and Hytrosaviridae) are grouped within the order Lefavirales. Naldaviricetes was formally established by the International Committee on Taxonomy of Viruses (ICTV) in 2021 to unify these families under a higher-rank taxon based on conserved genomic and structural features. The name Naldaviricetes derives from "Nuclear Arthropod Large DNA Viruses" (NALDVs), a term historically used to describe these four virus families.

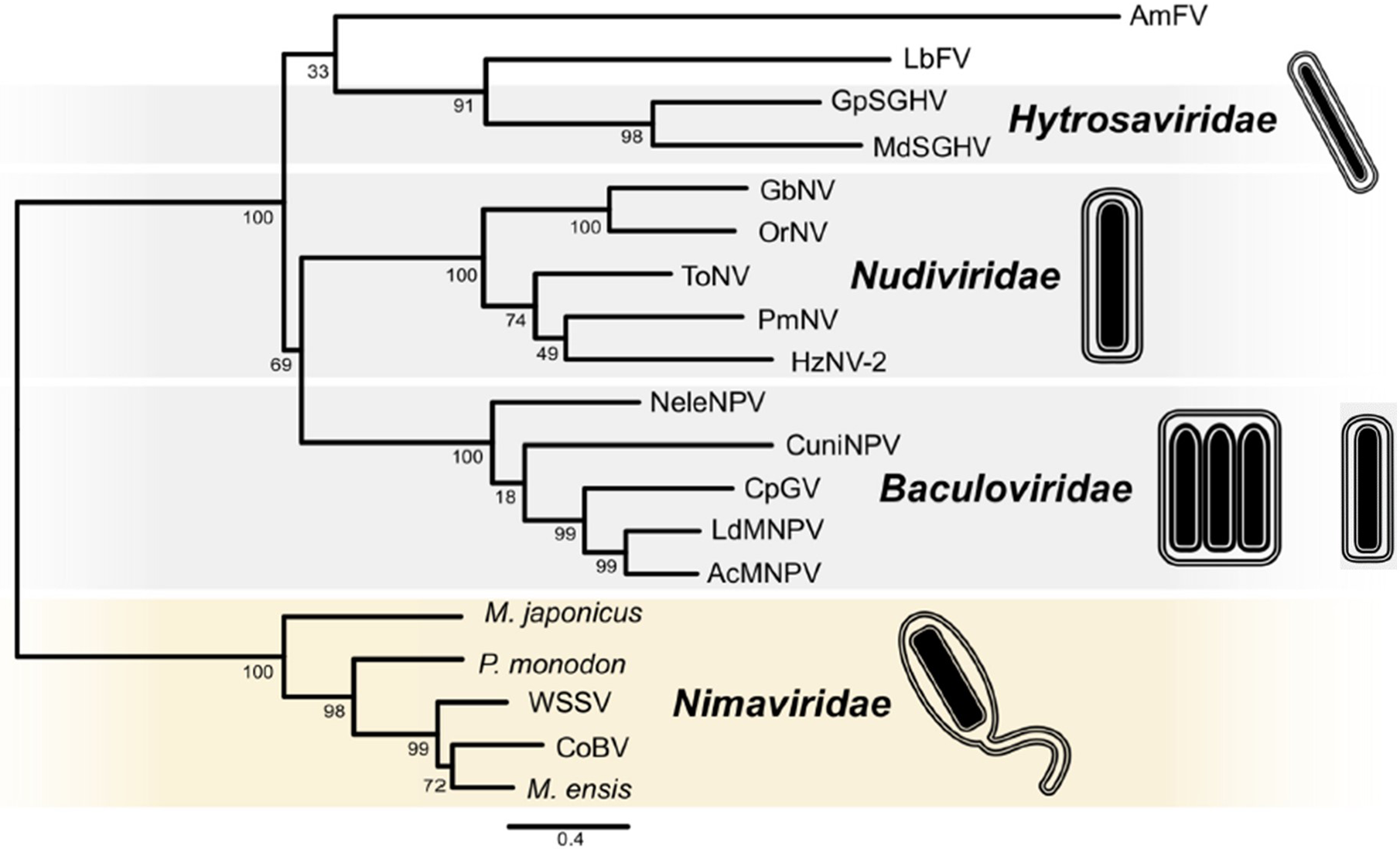
Concatenated alignments of five PIF amino acid sequences (pif-0/p74, pif-1, pif-2, pif-3, and pif-5/odv-e56), DNA polymerase (dnapol), and sulfhydryl oxidase (p33) of the members of the class Naldaviricetes

== General characteristics ==
Viruses in this class are enveloped, rod-shaped, large dsDNA viruses that replicate in the nuclei of infected cells. All members of Naldaviricetes share several diagnostic features:

- Conserved pif genes: pif0/p74, pif1–pif3, and pif5/odv-e56.
- Circular dsDNA genomes (≈ 80 – 300 kb) that replicate in the host cell nucleus.
- Enveloped, rod-shaped or ovoid nucleocapsids.
- Absence of vertical double-jelly-roll capsid proteins typical of Varidnaviria, indicating an independent evolutionary origin.

These shared traits, especially the PIF gene complement, distinguish Naldaviricetes from other arthropod-infecting large-DNA viruses such as Ascoviridae, Entomopoxvirinae, and Betairidovirinae, which lack pif homologs.

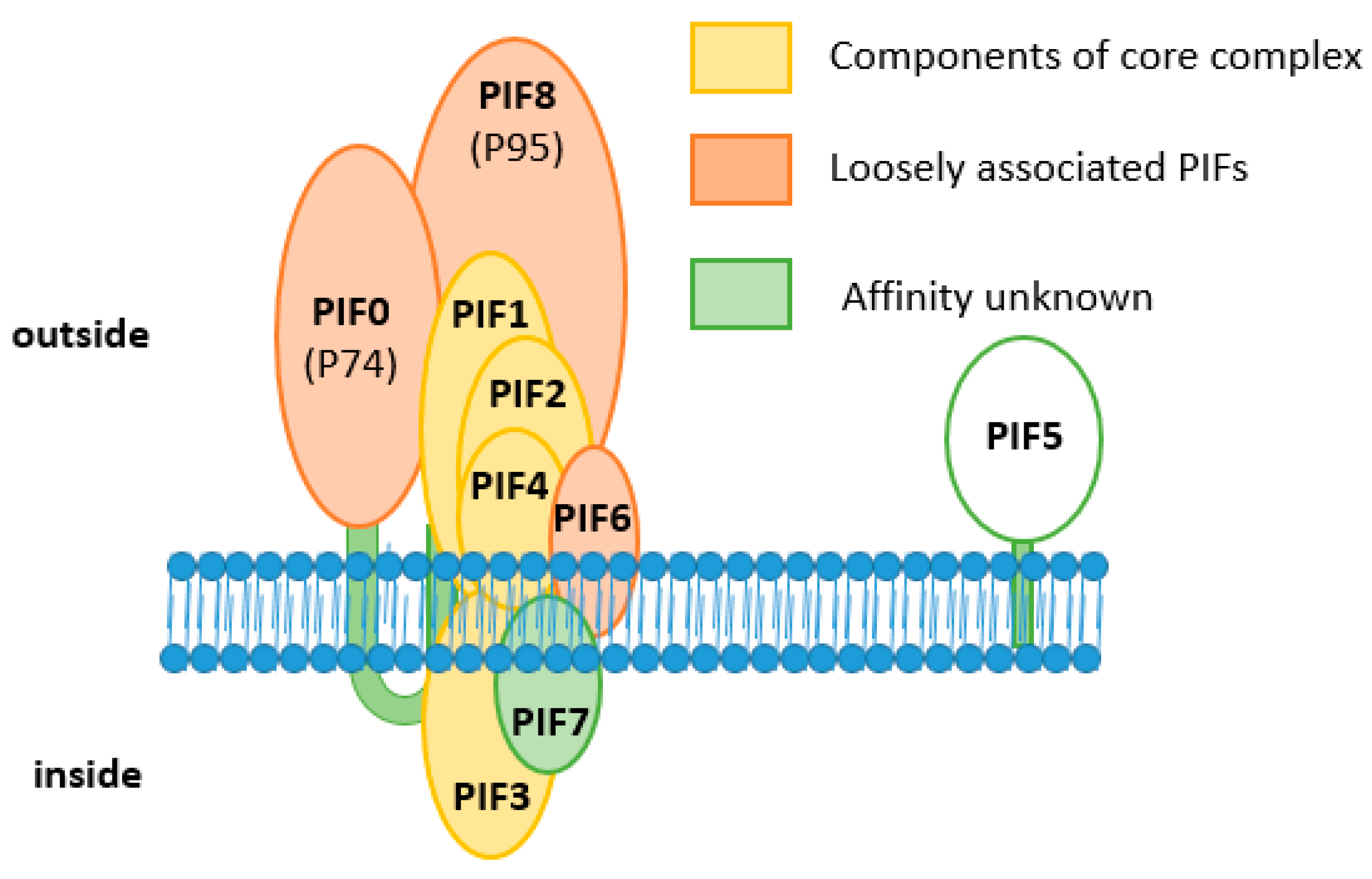
Model of the ODV entry complex showing Pifs associated with the baculoviruses.

== Pif genes ==
Pif genes encode a complex of envelope proteins that enable oral infectivity in insect midgut cells. They were first discovered in baculoviruses, and later found in nudiviruses, hytrosaviruses, and nimaviruses.The conservation of pif genes across these families is considered the molecular signature of Naldaviricetes. Homologs are also present in endogenous nudivirus-derived elements of braconid wasps (family Polydnaviriformidae), reflecting ancient gene capture events.

== Families ==
=== Baculoviridae ===
Enveloped, rod-shaped viruses of insects with circular dsDNA genomes of 80–180 kb. They produce two virion phenotypes—budded virus (BV) for systemic spread and occlusion-derived virus (ODV) for oral transmission. Baculoviruses are divided into four genera: Alphabaculovirus, Betabaculovirus, Gammabaculovirus, and Deltabaculovirus, and are transmitted orally and vertically from parent to offspring through infected eggs.

=== Hytrosaviridae ===
Hytrosaviruses are enveloped, non-occluded, non-icosahedral rod-shaped particles with rounded and/ or conical ends. The members with genomes sequenced are Glossina pallidipes salivary gland hypertrophy virus (GpSGHV, infecting the tsetse fly) and Musca domestica salivary gland hypertrophy virus (MdSGHV, infecting housefly) while the sequence of the hytrosavirus infecting narcissus bulb fly is not yet published and remains unclassified. They are transmitted orally, vertically, mechanically, and transovarially.

=== Nimaviridae ===
Nimaviridae has only a single member called White spot syndrome virus (WSSV) that infects aquatic crustaceans. WSSV virions are enveloped, ellipsoid-to-bacilliform with a flagellum-like extension. WSSV is transmitted orally or vertically.

=== Nudiviridae ===
Viruses with ellipsoidal to rod-shaped virions, typically non-occluded but some produce occlusion bodies. Their genomes (96–232 kb) encode ≈ 100–150 genes, including ~28 core genes shared with baculoviruses. Most nudiviruses like members of Alpha-, Delta- and Gammanudiviruses are transmitted orally; with Helicoverpa zea Nudivirus 2, as the only exception that is known to be transmitted sexually and vertically.

== Characteristics of the class Naldaviricetes ==
Characteristic	Baculoviridae	Nudiviridae	Hytrosaviridae	Nimaviridae
Morphology	Enveloped and rod shaped	Enveloped and rod shaped	Large, rod shaped and enveloped	Enveloped, ellipsoid to bacilliform with a flagellum-like extension
Virions	1. OBs have ODVs and ODVs have one to many rod-shaped nucleocapsids.; 2. BVs are single rod shaped nucleocapsids	Bacilliform nucleocapsids	Non-icosahedral and rod-shaped particles with a tegument	Rod shaped particles with a tegument
Occlusion bodies	Present	Present in OrNV, PmNV, ToNV, TpNV	Absent	Absent
Nucleic acid	Circular, supercoiled dsDNA of 80-180 kbp	Circular, supercoiled dsDNA of 96-232 kbp	Circular, dsDNA of 124 kbp (MdSGHV) or 190 Kbp (GpSGHV)	Circular, dsDNA of 280-307 kbp
Transmission	Oral	Orally, sexual and vertical	Oral, vertical, mechanical and transovarial	Oral and Vertical
Tropism	Midgut for ODVs and Systemic for BVs	Midgut, Gonads, and Hepatopancreas	Salivary glands and gonads	Midgut, gills, lymphoid organ and connective tissues
Molecules involved in infection	PIFs in ODVs and GP64 in BVs	N/A	N/A	Pifs

== Order Lefavirales ==
The order Lefavirales was created within Naldaviricetes to include the families Baculoviridae, Nudiviridae, and Hytrosaviridae. The name derives from "late expression factors (lef)", a group of baculoviral genes encoding the subunits of a DNA-directed RNA polymerase responsible for late-phase transcription. These genes—lef-4, lef-5, lef-8, lef-9, p47, and vlf-1—are conserved among lefaviral families but absent from Nimaviridae.

== Evolution ==
Phylogenetic analyses of concatenated PIF, DNA polymerase, and p33 (sulfhydryl oxidase) sequences indicate that Naldaviricetes form a monophyletic group distinct from the Nucleocytoviricota (formerly NCLDVs). Network analyses suggest they may represent an ancient branch of the Varidnaviria-related dsDNA virus network, albeit lacking the canonical double-jelly-roll capsid protein. Evidence of nudivirus-derived elements integrated into insect genomes points to deep co-evolution between these viruses and their arthropod hosts.

== Binomial naming system ==
In 2023, the ICTV adopted a binomial species-naming format for all viruses in the order Lefavirales. Each species name consists of the genus name followed by an epithet derived from the host species (e.g., Alphabaculovirus aucalifornicae, Betanudivirus hezeae, Glossinavirus glopallidipedis). This reform standardized naming while retaining traditional virus abbreviations and common names.

== Relationships to other taxa ==
While Naldaviricetes share certain ancestral traits with members of Varidnaviria, they lack hallmark major-capsid-protein genes of that realm. Within arthropod-infecting dsDNA viruses, they are distinguished from Ascoviridae, Entomopoxvirinae, and Betairidovirinae by nuclear replication and possession of pif genes. Members of the genus Bracoviriform (family Polydnaviriformidae) also retain ancient nudivirus-derived pif homologs.
