= Lefavirales =

Virus classification
- (unranked): Virus
- Class: Naldaviricetes
- Order: Lefavirales

Order of viruses

Lefavirales is an order of viruses of the class Naldaviricetes. Viruses of this order have Hexapoda and Crustacea as their hosts, including Adoxophyes and Carcinus.

== Classification ==
Lefavirales is part of the incertae sedis class Naldaviricetes. It contains the following families:

- Baculoviridae
- Filamentoviridae
- Hytrosaviridae
- Nudiviridae
