= Polyhedron (disambiguation) =

A polyhedron is a solid in three dimensions with flat polygonal faces, straight edges and sharp corners or vertices.

An intersection of half-spaces in n-dimensional space is also called a polyhedron; for this concept see n-dimensional polyhedron.

Polyhedron may also refer to:

- Polyhedron (magazine), formerly Polyhedron Newszine, a former magazine targeting consumers of role-playing games
- Polyhedron (journal), a scientific journal covering the field of inorganic chemistry

== See also ==
- Abstract polyhedron
- Polyhedrin, a protein that forms Baculovirus occlusion bodies
