= Lois Miller =

Lois Miller may refer to:

- Lois K. Miller (1945–1999), American geneticist
- Lois Kelly Miller (1917–2020), Jamaican theater and screen actress
