= Sf caspase-1 =

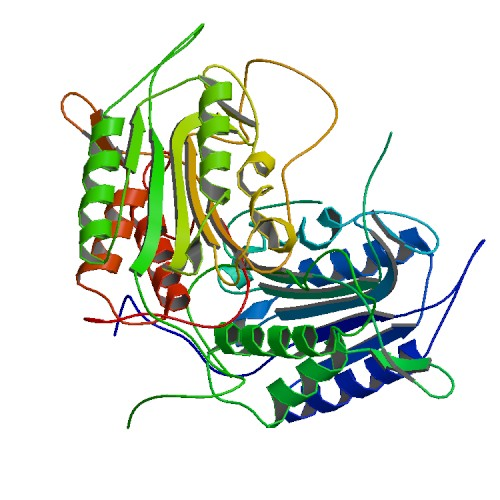
- Sf caspase-1 structure by Ni et al. 2006

Identifiers
- Organism: Spodoptera frugiperda (Fall armyworm)
- Symbol: N/A
- PDB: 2NN3
- RefSeq (mRNA): U81510.1
- RefSeq (Prot): AAC47442.1
- UniProt: P89116
Search for
- Structures: Swiss-model
- Domains: InterPro

The protein Sf caspase-1 is the insect ortholog of the human effector caspases CASP3 (CPP32) and CASP7 (MCH3) in the species Spodoptera frugiperda (Fall armyworm). It was identified as the target of the baculoviral caspase inhibitor protein P35, which it cleaves and by which it is inhibited. Like other caspases, Sf caspase-1 is an aspartate-specific cysteine protease that is produced as an inactive proenzyme and becomes activated by autocatalytic cleavage. The Sf caspase-1 proenzyme is cleaved after the amino acid residues Asp-28 and Asp-195, resulting in a smaller 12 kDa fragment and a larger 19 kDa fragment. Just like with human caspases CASP3 or CASP7, the two cleavage fragments form heterodimers, which again form biologically active dimers-of-heterodimers consisting of two smaller and two larger fragments. Some experiments also showed cleavage of Sf caspase-1 at the residue Asp-184, resulting in an 18 kDa instead of 19 kDa fragment, however this result is likely an in vitro artefact. The insect immunophilin FKBP46 is a substrate of Sf caspase-1, which cleaves full length FKBP46 (~46 kDa) resulting in a ~25 kDa fragment.
