= Cydia pomonella granulovirus =

Virus classification
- (unranked): Virus
- Class: Naldaviricetes
- Order: Lefavirales
- Family: Baculoviridae
- Genus: Betabaculovirus
- Species: Betabaculovirus cypomonellae

Species of virus

Cydia pomonella granulovirus (CpGV) is a granulovirus belonging to the family Baculoviridae. It has a double-stranded DNA genome that is approximately 123,500 base pairs in length with 143 ORFs. The virus forms small bodies called granules containing a single virion. CpGV is a virus of invertebrates – specifically Cydia pomonella, commonly known as the Codling moth. CpGV is highly pathogenic, it is known as a fast GV – that is, one that will kill its host in the same instar as infection; thus, it is frequently used as a biological pesticide.

== In pest control ==
C. pomonella has proved to be a problematic pest on several fruit trees, including apples and pears. The caterpillars burrow into the fruit, rendering it unfit for sale. Traditional insecticides are of limited use, as some strains have acquired resistance to several insecticides.

CpGV has been shown to kill many of the larvae of C. pomonella in trials without having adverse effects on humans or other animals, thanks to the specific nature of the virus.

The first CpGV strain, isolated in Mexico, has been commercially formulated into biological pesticides such as Madex (Andermatt Biocontrol AG), Carpovirusine (NPP/Arysta LifeScience) and Cyd-X (Certis). Due to the continued use of CpGV in the field, C. pomonella populations resistant to the Mexican strain have been identified. New strains which are able to manage resistant codling moth populations have been developed. These strains are commercialized by BioTEPP inc. into Virosoft CP4, NPP/Arysta LifeScience into Carpovirusine Evo 2 and by Andermatt Biocontrol AG into Madex Max and Madex Plus.

== See also ==
- Biological insecticides
