= Polyhedrosis =

Polyhedrosis is a viral disease in which polyhedral 'occlusion bodies' are formed, which carry the virus.

Polyhedrosis may refer to:

- Cytoplasmic polyhedrosis virus
- Nuclear polyhedrosis virus
