= Early 35 kDa protein =

Anti-apoptotic viral protein

Early 35 kDa protein (AcMNPV)
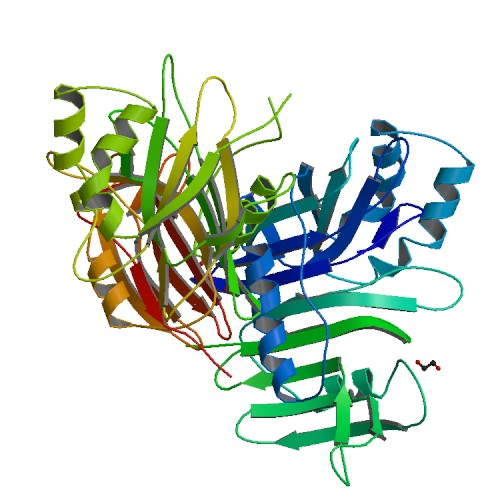
- P35 structure by Fisher et al. 1999

Identifiers
- Organism: Autographa californica nuclear polyhedrosis virus (AcMNPV)
- Symbol: P35
- Entrez: 1403968
- PDB: 1P35
- RefSeq (mRNA): NC_001623.1
- RefSeq (Prot): NP_054165.1
- UniProt: P08160

Other data
- Chromosome: 0: 0.12 - 0.12 Mb
Search for
- Structures: Swiss-model
- Domains: InterPro

Early 35 kDa protein (BmNPV)

Identifiers
- Organism: Bombyx mori nuclear polyhedrosis virus (BmNPV)
- Symbol: P35
- Entrez: 1488744
- RefSeq (mRNA): NC_001962.1
- RefSeq (Prot): NP_047533.1
- UniProt: P31354

Other data
- Chromosome: 0: 0.11 - 0.11 Mb
Search for
- Structures: Swiss-model
- Domains: InterPro

The Early 35 kDa protein, or P35 in short, is a baculoviral protein that inhibits apoptosis in the cells infected by the virus. Although baculoviruses infect only invertebrates in nature, ectopic expression of P35 in vertebrate animals and cells also results in inhibition of apoptosis, thus indicating a universal mechanism. P35 has been shown to be a caspase inhibitor with a very wide spectrum of activity both in regard to inhibited caspase types and to species in which the mechanism is conserved.

== Species distribution ==
P35 has been found in different strains of the nuclear polyhedrosis virus, a species of baculovirus that infects insects. Two orthologs of P35 that have been studied in detail are the ones from the Autographa californica multicapsid nuclear polyhedrosis virus (AcMNPV) and from the Bombyx mori nuclear polyhedrosis virus (BmNPV). The P35 ortholog from AcMNPV was found to block apoptosis in mammalian cells much more efficiently as compared to the ortholog from BmNPV.

== Function ==
The P35 protein inhibits apoptosis by acting as a competitive, irreversible inhibitor of caspases. P35 first serves as a caspase substrate and is cleaved between the amino acids D87 and G88, i.e. after the sequence DQMD in P35 from AcMNPV and after the sequence DKID in P35 from BmNPV, resulting in two polypeptide products of about 10 kDa and 25 kDa in size. The cleavage site is situated in a solvent-exposed loop that extends from the protein's beta sheet core, thus ensuring good accessibility to the caspase. However, unlike other caspase substrate proteins, the fragments of P35 do not dissociate from the caspase after cleavage. Instead, the N-terminal, 10 kDa cleavage fragment remains bound to the caspase by a covalent, stable thioester bond between the cleavage residue D87 of P35 and the cysteine residue at the active site of the caspase.

While the formation of a thioester intermediate between the aspartate of the substrate's recognition site and the cysteine of the caspase's active site is a normal event in caspase-mediated protein cleavage, the resulting bond is normally quickly hydrolysed so that the cleaved products can detach. In the case of P35, however, the caspase-substrate complex remains stable. Cleavage of P35 triggers rapid conformational changes that reposition its N-terminus, which is normally buried in the protein's beta-sheet core, to the caspase's active site. As a consequence of this rearrangement, the N-terminal P35 residues C2 and V3 interact with the caspase's active site to displace water and prevent the hydrolysis reaction. The P35 residue C2 competes with the caspase's active site cysteine residue for binding of the P35 residue D87, keeping the reaction trapped in an equilibrium state.

== Interactions ==
In insect cells, P35 inhibits an enzyme called Sf caspase-1, which was identified as a structural and functional ortholog of human CASP3 (CPP32) and CASP7 (MCH3). Studies using purified human caspases in vitro found that the protein is able to also inhibit several of these, including CASP1, CASP3, CASP6, CASP7, CASP8, and CASP10.

== Clinical significance ==
Since baculoviridae infect only insects and not humans, the function of P35 in the immune evasion of infected cells is not clinically relevant. However, P35 has been considered as a potential tool in gene therapy to suppress apoptosis where it is not wanted, such as in the protection of transplanted tissue from immune rejection or in the killing of bystander cells in cancer therapy; such methods are still far from clinical application though.

== History and discovery ==
The role of P35 in the inhibition of apoptosis was first described by Rollie J. Clem in the research group of Lois K. Miller at the Department of Genetics at the University of Georgia in 1991. Four years later, in 1995, the reason for apoptosis inhibition by P35 was identified as its ability to bind and inhibit caspases (then still called ICE homologs) by Nancy J. Bump and co-workers at the BASF Bioresearch Corporation in Worcester, Massachusetts. The mechanism of caspase inhibition was discovered by Guozhou Xu in the team of Hao Wu at the Department of Biochemistry at Weill Cornell Medical College in 2001.
