= Gammabaculovirus =

Virus classification
- (unranked): Virus
- Class: Naldaviricetes
- Order: Lefavirales
- Family: Baculoviridae
- Genus: Gammabaculovirus

Genus of viruses

Gammabaculovirus is a genus of viruses, in the family Baculoviridae. Hymenoptera serve as natural hosts. There are three species in this genus.

== Taxonomy ==
The genus contains the following species, listed by scientific name and followed by the exemplar virus of the species:

- Gammabaculovirus neabietis, Neodiprion abietis nucleopolyhedrovirus
- Gammabaculovirus nelecontei, Neodiprion lecontei nucleopolyhedrovirus
- Gammabaculovirus nesertiferis, Neodiprion sertifer nucleopolyhedrovirus

== Structure ==
Viruses in Gammabaculovirus are enveloped. Genomes are circular, around 82-86kb in length. The genome codes for 90 proteins.

Genus	Structure	Symmetry	Capsid	Genomic arrangement	Genomic segmentation
Gammabaculovirus	Budded or Occluded		Enveloped	Circular	Monopartite

== Life cycle ==
Viral replication is nuclear. Entry into the host cell is achieved by attachment of the viral glycoproteins to host receptors, which mediates endocytosis. Replication follows the dsDNA bidirectional replication model. DNA-templated transcription, with some alternative splicing mechanism is the method of transcription. The virus exits the host cell by nuclear pore export, and existing in occlusion bodies after cell death and remaining infectious until finding another host. Hymenoptera serve as the natural host. Transmission routes are fecal-oral.

Genus	Host details	Tissue tropism	Entry details	Release details	Replication site	Assembly site	Transmission
Gammabaculovirus	Hymenoptera	Epithileal: midgut	Cell receptor endocytosis	Budding; Occlusion	Nucleus	Nucleus	Oral-fecal
