= Mastrus ridens =

Scientific classification
- Kingdom: Animalia
- Phylum: Arthropoda
- Clade: Pancrustacea
- Class: Insecta
- Order: Hymenoptera
- Family: Ichneumonidae
- Genus: Mastrus
- Species: M. ridens

Binomial name
- Mastrus ridens Horstmann, 2009

Species of wasp

Mastrus ridens is a species of ichneumon wasp. It was discovered in Kazakhstan in the 1990s, but it was not described as a distinct species from the similar M. ridibundus until 2010. This species is of interest as a potential biological control agent of the codling moth.
