= Polyhedrin =

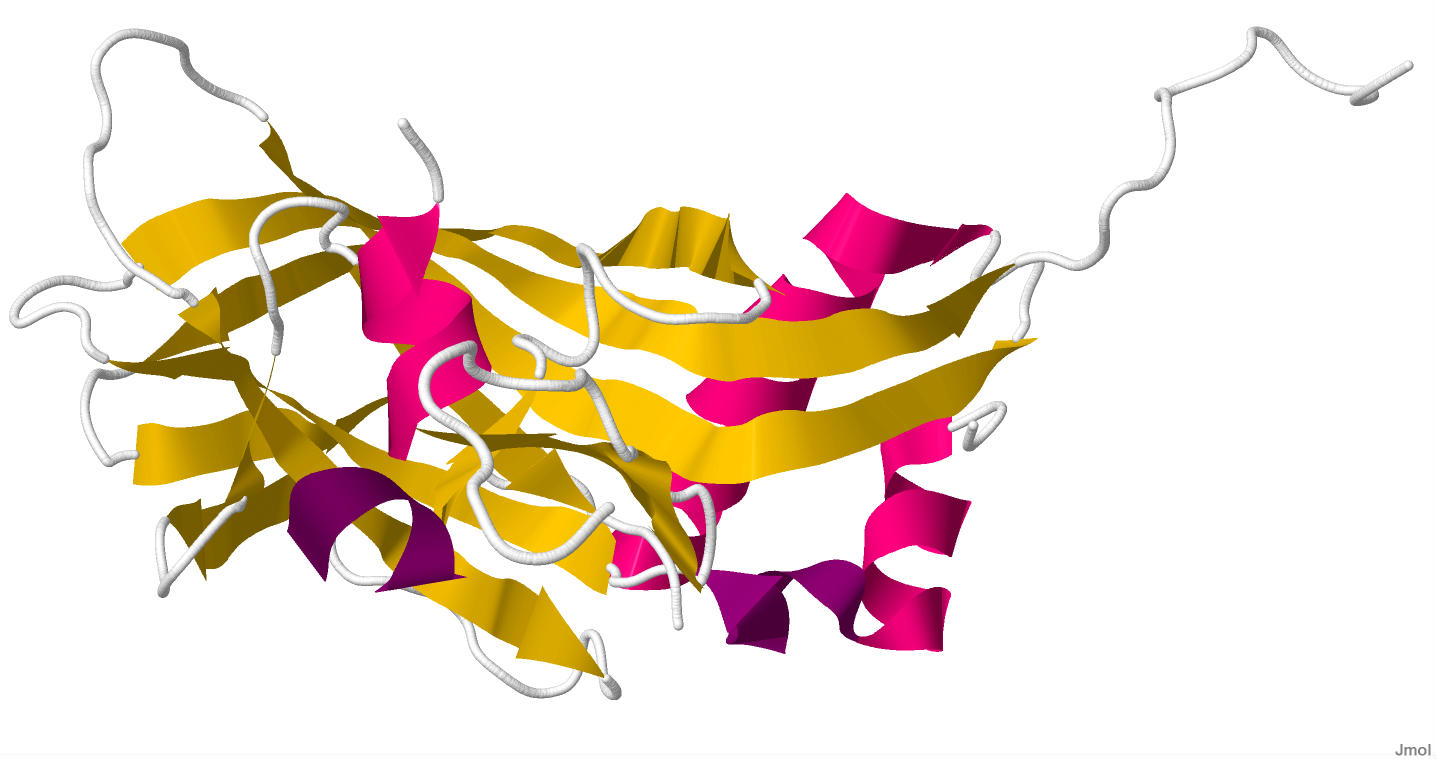
- The crystal structure of a recombinant baculovirus polyhedrin.

Identifiers
- Symbol: Polyhedrin
- Pfam: PF00738
- InterPro: IPR001746
Available protein structures:
- PDB: IPR001746 PF00738 (ECOD; PDBsum)
- AlphaFold: IPR001746; PF00738

For the three dimensional shape, see Polyhedron

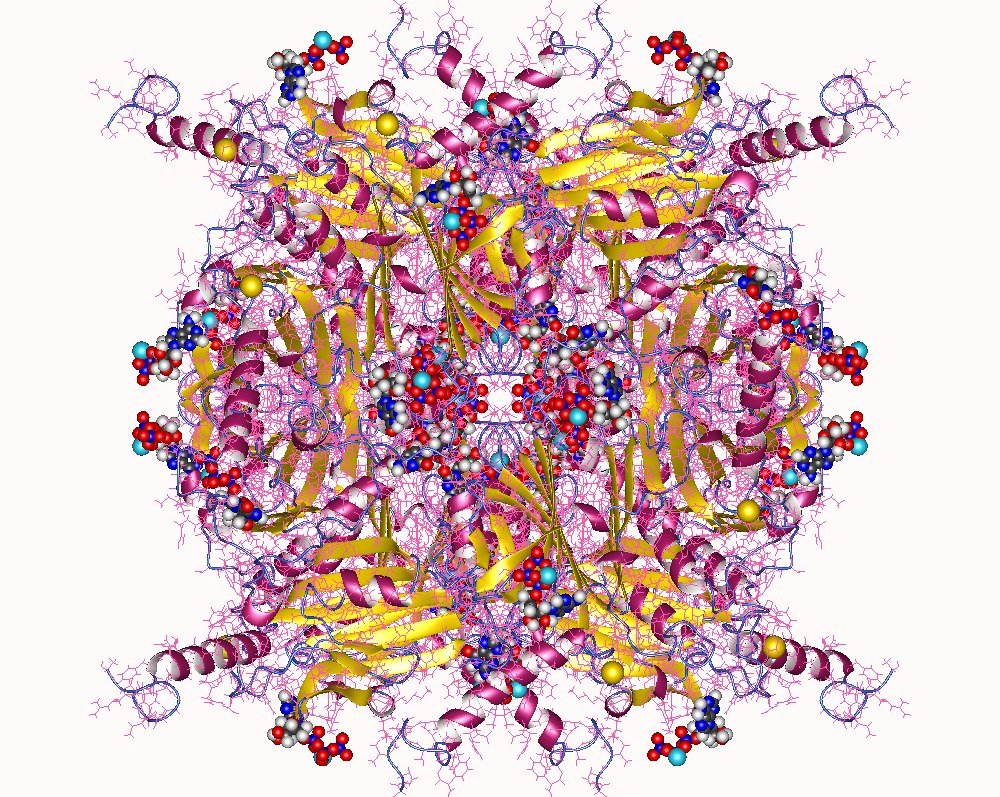
Polyhedrin dodecamer, Cypovirus 1.

Polyhedrins are a type of viral protein that form occlusion bodies (also called polyhedra), large structures that protect the virus particles from the outside environment for extended periods until they are ingested by susceptible insects. They occur in various viruses including nuclear polyhedrosis viruses (NPVs) and granuloviruses (GVs). GVs contain one virus particle per occlusion, whereas NPVs package about 5–15 viruses in each occlusion.
