= BacMam =

Use of baculovirus to deliver genes to mammalian cells

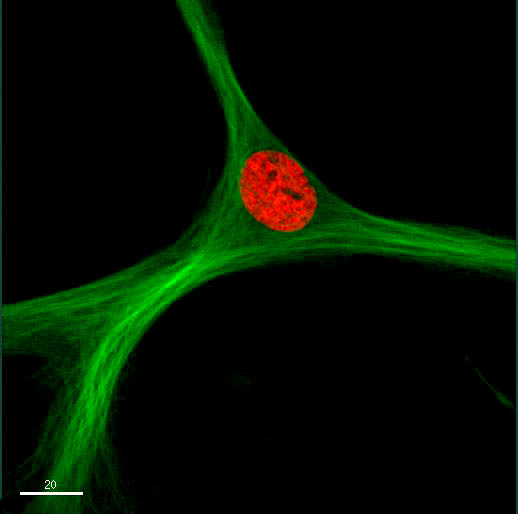
A human mesenchymal stem cell expressing microtubule associated protein fusion to Green fluorescent protein (green) and histone 2b fusion to tagRFP (red) via BacMam gene delivery technology.

Baculovirus gene transfer into Mammalian cells (BacMam) is the use of a baculovirus to deliver genes to mammalian cells. Baculoviruses are insect viruses that are typically not capable of infecting mammalian cells; however, they can be modified to express proteins in mammalian cells. Unmodified baculoviruses are able to enter mammalian cells; however, their genes are not expressed unless a recognizable mammalian promoter is incorporated upstream of a gene of interest. Both the unmodified baculovirus and its modified counterpart are unable to replicate in humans, making them non-infectious.

Baculovirus-mediated gene transfer was developed by Dr. Frederick M. Boyce. It has gained widespread use because of certain advantages compared to other transfection methods. BacMam has been found to have some stability and flexibility over other cell line methods, which has contributed to its adoption as a standard gene transfer technique.

== General properties ==
The BacMam gene delivery technology is a transient expression system, which facilitates the expression of gene products. It has a broad range of transduction, including many primary cell types and stem cells. The baculoviral genome has a large capacity for the insertion of foreign genes, with insertions of up to 38 kb having been successfully tested. Simultaneous delivery of multiple genes to the same cell is feasible. There are little to no microscopically observable cytopathic effects of BacMam particles on mammalian cells. The level of gene expression can be adjusted by viral dose or chemical additions using histone deacetylase inhibitors. Transduction of cells is performed by liquid-only addition, making BacMam amenable to automated methods. Viruses are stable when stored at 4 °C in the dark for long periods of time.

== Biosafety considerations ==
Baculoviruses are Risk Group 1 agents that have been widely used for over 25 years for insect cell protein production applications. Baculoviruses are produced in insect cells and incapable of replicating in mammalian cells and are not known to cause disease in healthy human adults. Furthermore, BacMam viruses are inactivated by human complement, which reduces risk to researchers. Viruses used in the laboratory are unable to replicate in insects, so there is no environmental threat if these particles were to be released into the environment.

== Viral entry ==
Studies on baculovirus entry into human hepatocellular carcinoma cells suggest that BacMam enters mammalian cells via clathrin-mediated endocytosis and possibly via micropinocytosis. Further studies have suggested that caveolae are involved in baculovirus entry in mammalian cells.

== Host cell response ==
To be effective, a gene delivery technology must not interfere with normal cellular function. Cytotoxicity assays and transcriptome analyses on a human HEK cell line (HEK293) have revealed that baculovirus transduction is not cytotoxic and does not induce differential transcriptional responses. Similarly, infected Schwann cells retain their characteristic morphological and molecular phenotype and are capable of differentiating in vitro and expressing the P0 myelination marker. Using complementary DNA (cDNA) microarray technology to examine in vitro and in vivo global cellular gene expression profiles in the rat brain, cultured human astrocytes, and human neuronal cells after viral transduction, host antiviral responses were observed. The related genes were mainly those associated with innate immunity, including several of the genes involved in Toll-like receptor signaling pathway and cytokine-cytokine receptor interaction.

== Uses ==
=== Bioproduction ===
BacMam has been used to produce proteins in large quantities using HEK293 cells in a hollow fiber bioreactor system.

=== High-Throughput Screening ===
Pharmacology of G protein-coupled receptor can be studied using BacMam technology in drug discovery applications.

=== Fluorescence Microscopy ===
Organelle labeling reagents are commercially available BacMam particles for labeling organelles and other subcellular structures Single mitochondrion labeling with a mitochondrial targeted green fluorescent protein.

=== Receptor Activation/Pathway Analysis ===
Characterization of serotonin receptor activation via a BacMam delivered GFP fusion to a kinase substrate has been performed.

=== Structural Biology ===
The BacMam system can be used to produce soluble and membrane-situated glycoproteins for structural studies.

== See also ==
- Baculovirus
