= Lois K. Miller =

American geneticist and academic

Lois Kathryn Miller
- Lois Kathryn Miller
- Born: May 2, 1945; Lebanon, Pennsylvania, United States
- Died: November 9, 1999 (aged 54); Athens, Georgia, United States
- Education: Upsala College (BS), University of Wisconsin–Madison (PhD)
- Spouse: Karl Espelie
- Children: 1
- Awards: Lamar Dodd Award for Outstanding Research, National Institutes of Health Merit Award, Chiron Biotechnology Research Award
- Scientific career
- Fields: Virology, genetics
- Institutions: University of Wisconsin–Madison (1967–1971), California Institute of Technology and Imperial Cancer Research Fund (1971–1976), University of Idaho (1976–1986), University of Georgia (1986–1999)
- Thesis: A study of two enzymatic activities associated with deoxyribonucleic acid polymerases: I. The exonucleolytic activity of the Micrococcus luteus DNA polymerase; II. Nucleoside diphosphokinase (1971)
- Doctoral advisor: Robert D. Wells

Lois Kathryn Miller (May 2, 1945 (Note: Miller's National Academy of Sciences biographical memoir lists two birthdates – this one and October 8, 1945.) – November 9, 1999) was an American geneticist and academic. She was a Distinguished Research Professor of Genetics and Entomology at the University of Georgia. A graduate of Upsala College, she taught at the University of Idaho before moving to Georgia. Miller's research was related to baculoviruses, which infect agricultural pests. She was elected to the National Academy of Sciences and was a fellow of the American Association for the Advancement of Science.

== Early life ==
Miller was born in Lebanon, Pennsylvania, the youngest of three children born to Clarence and Naomi Miller; her father was a Lutheran clergyman and her mother taught Latin at a high school. Miller's family moved several times during her childhood due to her father's job, and she attended junior high and high school in Harrisburg, Pennsylvania.

While completing her undergraduate education at Upsala College, Miller spent a summer doing research at the Oak Ridge National Laboratory. She graduated from Upsala in 1967. and she earned a Ph.D. at the University of Wisconsin–Madison. At Wisconsin, she worked with Bob G. Wells, whose laboratory was trying to better understand DNA polymerase. While in graduate school, she met Karl Espelie, who became her husband; they had a daughter in 1979.

== Career ==
Miller joined the faculty at the University of Idaho in 1976, and she moved to the University of Georgia ten years later, becoming a Distinguished Research Professor of Genetics and Entomology. She focused her research on baculoviruses and programmed cell death. In 1991, her team at the University of Georgia discovered the anti-apoptotic properties of the baculoviral Early 35 kDa protein (P35).

Miller was elected to membership in the National Academy of Sciences in 1987 and was made a fellow of the American Association for the Advancement of Science in 1992.

== Death ==
Miller, who had been treated for melanoma in the mid-1980s, experienced a recurrence of the cancer in the mid-1990s. She underwent cancer treatment - including experimental immunotherapy treatments at the National Cancer Institute - until she entered home hospice care in early 1999. She died on November 9, 1999.

After her death, Miller continued to receive recognition for her work. She won the Inventor of the Year Award from the University of Georgia in 2001.
