= Deltabaculovirus =

Virus classification
- (unranked): Virus
- Class: Naldaviricetes
- Order: Lefavirales
- Family: Baculoviridae
- Genus: Deltabaculovirus

Genus of viruses

Deltabaculovirus is a genus of viruses, in the family Baculoviridae. Mosquito larvae serve as natural hosts. There is only one species in this genus: Culex nigripalpus nucleopolyhedrovirus (Deltabaculovirus cunigripalpi).

== Structure ==
Viruses in Deltabaculovirus are enveloped. Genomes are circular, around 80-180kb in length. The genome codes for 100 to 180 proteins.

Genus	Structure	Symmetry	Capsid	Genomic arrangement	Genomic segmentation
Deltabaculovirus	Budded or Occluded		Enveloped	Circular	Monopartite

== Life cycle ==
Viral replication is nuclear. Entry into the host cell is achieved by attachment of the viral glycoproteins to host receptors, which mediates endocytosis. Replication follows the dsDNA bidirectional replication model. DNA-templated transcription, with some alternative splicing mechanism is the method of transcription. The virus exits the host cell by nuclear pore export, and existing in occlusion bodies after cell death and remaining infectious until finding another host. Mosquito larvae serve as the natural host. Transmission routes are fecal-oral.

Genus	Host details	Tissue tropism	Entry details	Release details	Replication site	Assembly site	Transmission
Deltabaculovirus	Mosquito: larva	Epithileal: midgut	Cell receptor endocytosis	Budding; Occlusion	Nucleus	Nucleus	Contact
