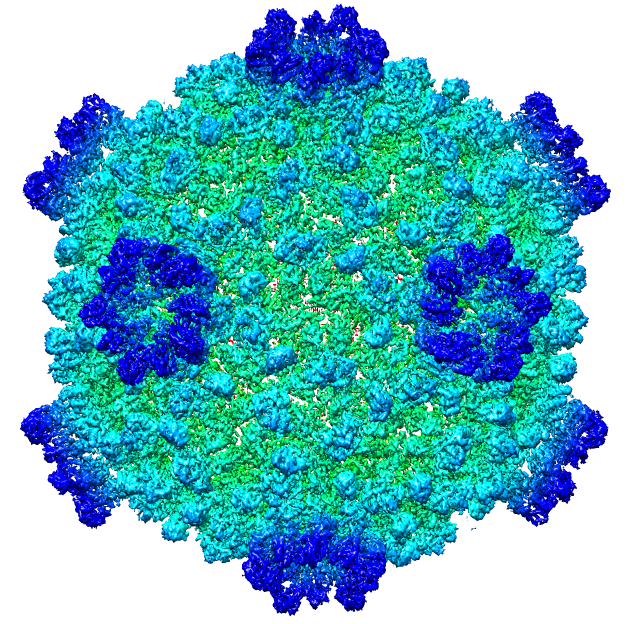
- Ultrastructure of a cypovirus virion
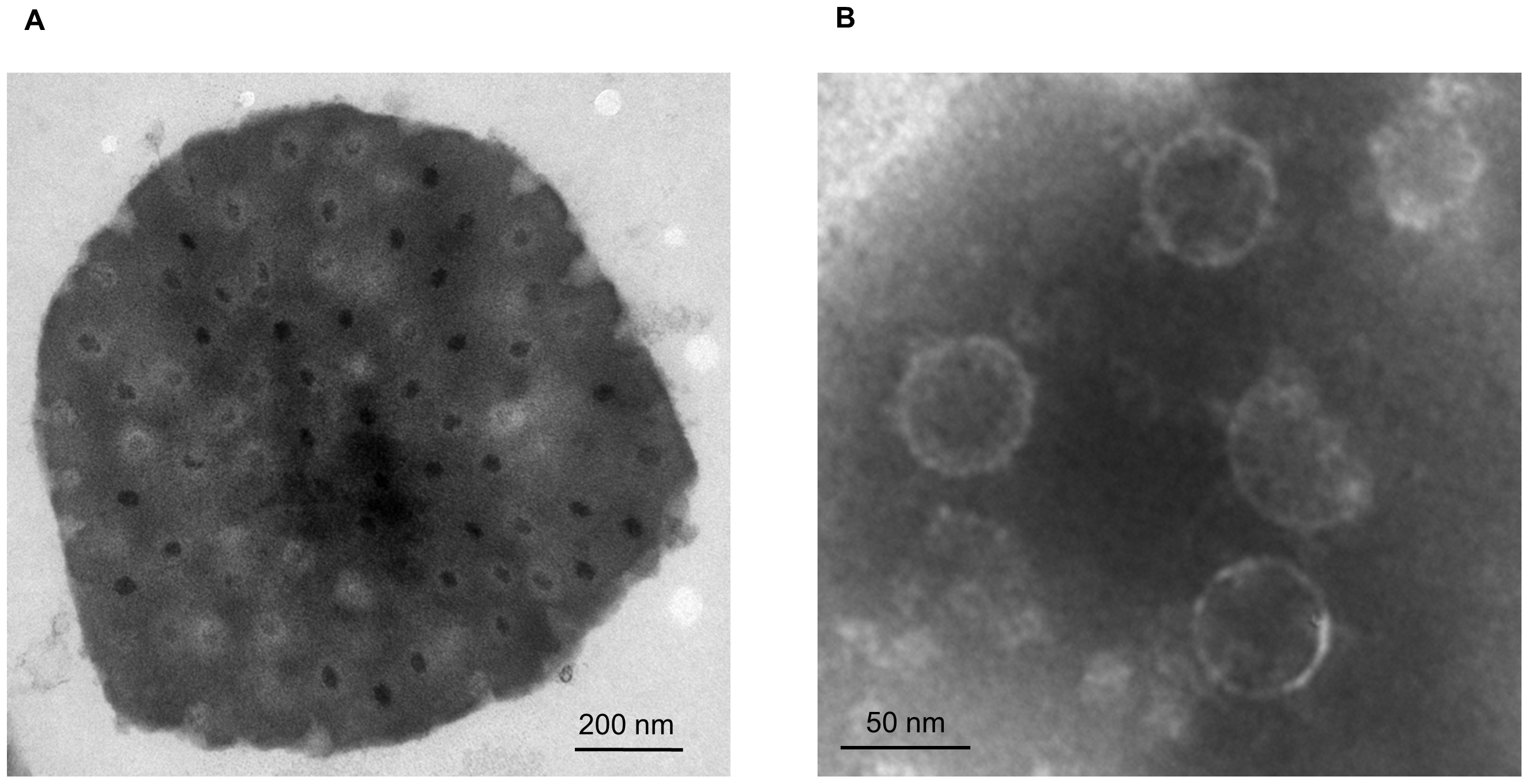
- TEM of occlusion body and virions of Dendrolimus punctatus cypovirus

Virus classification
- (unranked): Virus
- Realm: Riboviria
- Kingdom: Orthornavirae
- Phylum: Duplornaviricota
- Class: Resentoviricetes
- Order: Reovirales
- Family: Spinareoviridae
- Genus: Cypovirus

Species
- See text

= Cypovirus =

Genus of viruses

Cypovirus, short for cytoplasmic polyhedrosis virus, is a genus of double-stranded RNA viruses in the order Reovirales and family Spinareoviridae, isolated solely from insects. Associated diseases include chronic diarrhoea and pale blue iridescence in the guts of larvae. It contains sixteen species.

Cypoviruses are structurally similar to the more widely studied nucleopolyhedroviruses, a genus of arthropodean viruses in the family Baculoviridae, except for their RNA genomes and cytoplasmic replication instead of DNA genomes and nucleic replication.

== Structure ==
Viruses in the genus Cypovirus are nonenveloped, with icosahedral geometries, and T=2 symmetry. Cypoviruses have only a single capsid shell, which is similar to the orthoreovirus inner core. They exhibit striking capsid stability, which is fully capable of endogenous RNA transcription and processing. The capsid diameter is around 65 nm.

== Genome ==
Genomes are linear and segmented. The genome codes for 10 to 12 proteins. Classification of cypoviruses is based on the electrophoretic migration profiles of their genome segments. The overall folds of cypovirus proteins are similar to those of other reoviruses, but they have insertional domains and unique structures that contribute to their extensive intermolecular interactions. The cypovirus turret protein contains two methylase domains with a highly conserved helix-pair/β-sheet/helix-pair sandwich fold, but lacks the β-barrel flap present in orthoreovirus λ2. The stacking of turret protein functional domains and the presence of constrictions and A spikes along the mRNA release pathway indicate a mechanism that uses pores and channels to regulate the highly coordinated steps of RNA transcription, processing, and release.

== Lifecycle ==
Viral replication is cytoplasmic. Entry into the host cell is achieved by attachment to host receptors, which mediates endocytosis. Replication follows the double-stranded RNA virus replication model. Double-stranded RNA virus transcription is the method of transcription. Translation takes place by ribosomal skipping. The virus exits the host cell by monopartite nontubule guided viral movement, and exists in occlusion bodies after cell death and remains infectious until finding another host.

Insects serve as their natural hosts. Transmission routes are fecal-oral, parental, and egg transmission.

Infection occurs when a susceptible insect consumes viral polyhedra, usually as a contaminant on the insect’s food (in most cases, foliage of a plant). These dissolve in its digestive tract, releasing the virus particles that penetrate the gut epithelial cells. Replication of the virus is often confined to these cells and the progeny virus, in the form of new polyhedra are excreted in the insect feces, thus contaminating more foliage resulting in the spread of the disease to additional insects. The progression of the disease can be rather slow, but the virus infection is normally fatal.

== Species ==
Diagram of a cypovirus virion and polyhedron

The genus contains the following species:

- Cypovirus aglaidis
- Cypovirus agrotidis
- Cypovirus altineae
- Cypovirus antheraeae
- Cypovirus aplocerae
- Cypovirus aprophylae
- Cypovirus autographae
- Cypovirus betineae
- Cypovirus choristoneurae
- Cypovirus gatineae
- Cypovirus heliothidis
- Cypovirus inachidis
- Cypovirus lymantriae
- Cypovirus mamestrae
- Cypovirus polistis
- Cypovirus trichoplusiae

== See also ==
- Baculoviridae – members of this family may also cause polyhedrosis
- Betairidovirinae – members of this subfamily may also cause iridescence
