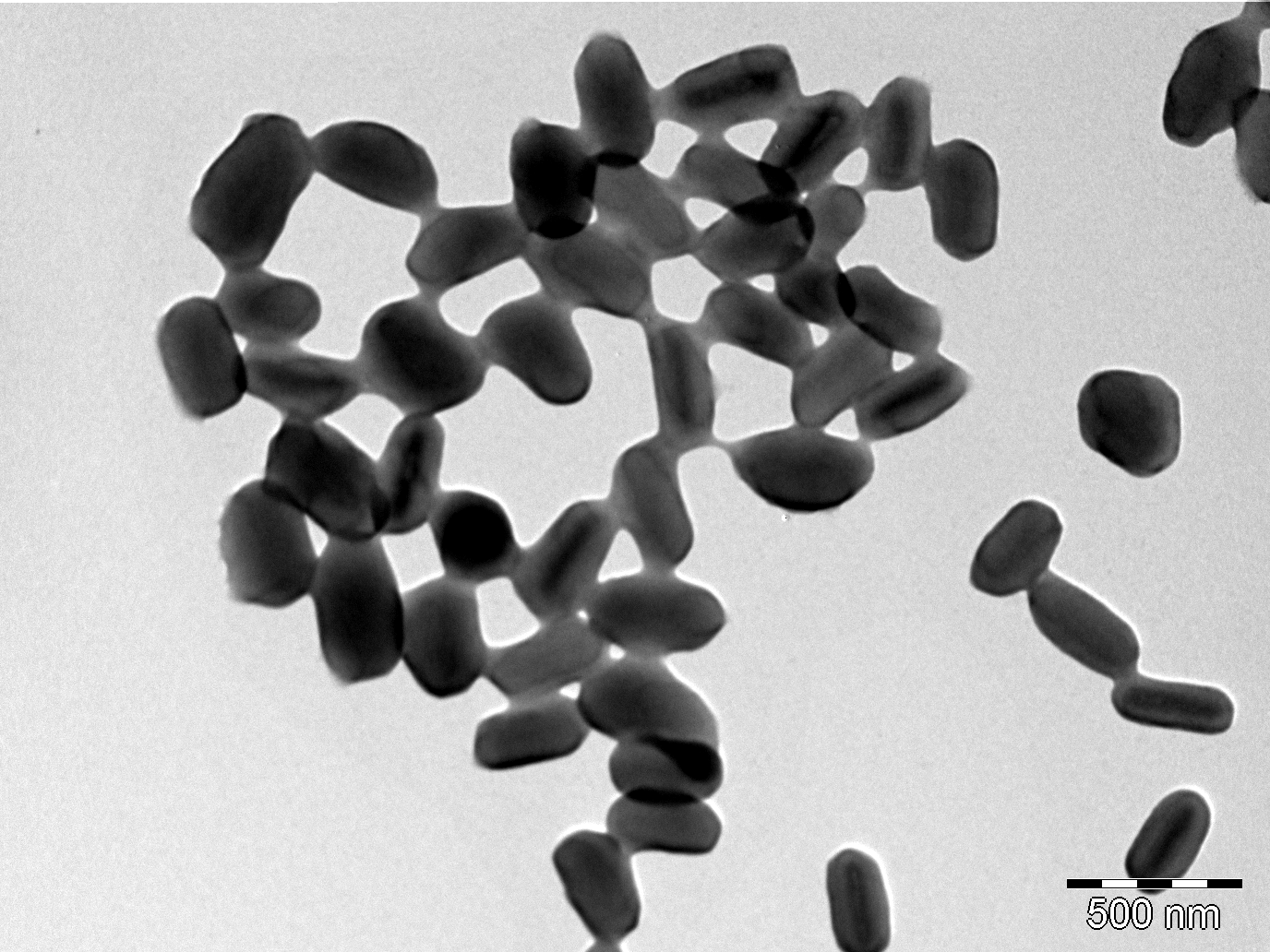
- Electron micrograph of Phthorimaea operculella granulovirus occlusion bodies

Virus classification
- (unranked): Virus
- Class: Naldaviricetes
- Order: Lefavirales
- Family: Baculoviridae
- Genus: Betabaculovirus

= Betabaculovirus =

Genus of viruses

Betabaculovirus is a genus of viruses, in the family Baculoviridae. Arthropods serve as natural hosts. There are 29 species in this genus.

== Taxonomy ==
The genus contains the following species, listed by scientific name and followed by the exemplar virus of the species:

- Betabaculovirus adoranae, Adoxophyes orana granulovirus
- Betabaculovirus agsegetum, Agrotis segetum granulovirus
- Betabaculovirus alterclanastomosis, Clostera anastomosis granulovirus B
- Betabaculovirus altermyunipunctae, Mythimna unipuncta granulovirus
- Betabaculovirus arrapae, Pieris rapae granulovirus Wuhan
- Betabaculovirus chofumiferanae, Choristoneura occidentalis granulovirus
- Betabaculovirus clanachoretae, Clostera anachoreta granulovirus
- Betabaculovirus clanastomosis, Clostera anastomosis granulovirus A
- Betabaculovirus cnamedinalis, Cnaphalocrocis medinalis granulovirus
- Betabaculovirus cryleucotretae, Cryptophlebia leucotreta granulovirus
- Betabaculovirus cypomonellae, Cydia pomonella granulovirus
- Betabaculovirus disaccharalis, Diatraea saccharalis granulovirus
- Betabaculovirus epaporemae, Epinotia aporema granulovirus
- Betabaculovirus erellonis, Erinnyis ello granulovirus
- Betabaculovirus habrilliantis, Harrisina brillians granulovirus
- Betabaculovirus helarmigerae, Helicoverpa armigera granulovirus
- Betabaculovirus hycuneae, Hyphantria cunea granulovirus
- Betabaculovirus lacoleraceae, Lacanobia oleracea granulovirus
- Betabaculovirus maphaseoli, Matsumuraeses phaseoli granulovirus
- Betabaculovirus molatipedis, Mocis latipes granulovirus
- Betabaculovirus myunipunctae, Pseudaletia unipuncta granulovirus
- Betabaculovirus phoperculellae, Phthorimaea operculella granulovirus
- Betabaculovirus plidaeusalis, Platynota idaeusalis granulovirus
- Betabaculovirus plinterpunctellae, Plodia interpunctella granulovirus
- Betabaculovirus pluxylostellae, Plutella xylostella granulovirus
- Betabaculovirus psincretae, Psilogramma increta granulovirus
- Betabaculovirus spliturae, Spodoptera litura granulovirus
- Betabaculovirus spofrugiperdae, Spodoptera frugiperda granulovirus
- Betabaculovirus xecnigri, Xestia c-nigrum granulovirus

== Structure ==
Viruses in Betabaculovirus are enveloped. Genomes are circular, around 80-180kb in length. The genome codes for 100 to 180 proteins.

Genus	Structure	Symmetry	Capsid	Genomic arrangement	Genomic segmentation
Betabaculovirus	Budded or Occluded		Enveloped	Circular	Monopartite

== Life cycle ==
Viral replication is nuclear. Entry into the host cell is achieved by attachment of the viral glycoproteins to host receptors, which mediates endocytosis. Replication follows the dsDNA bidirectional replication model. Dna templated transcription, with some alternative splicing mechanism is the method of transcription. The virus exits the host cell by nuclear pore export, and existing in occlusion bodies after cell death and remaining infectious until finding another host. Arthropods serve as the natural host. Transmission routes are fecal-oral.

Genus	Host details	Tissue tropism	Entry details	Release details	Replication site	Assembly site	Transmission
Betabaculovirus	Arthropods	Midgut then hemocoel; digestive gland epithelium (shrimps)	Cell receptor endocytosis	Budding; Occlusion	Nucleus	Nucleus	Oral-fecal
