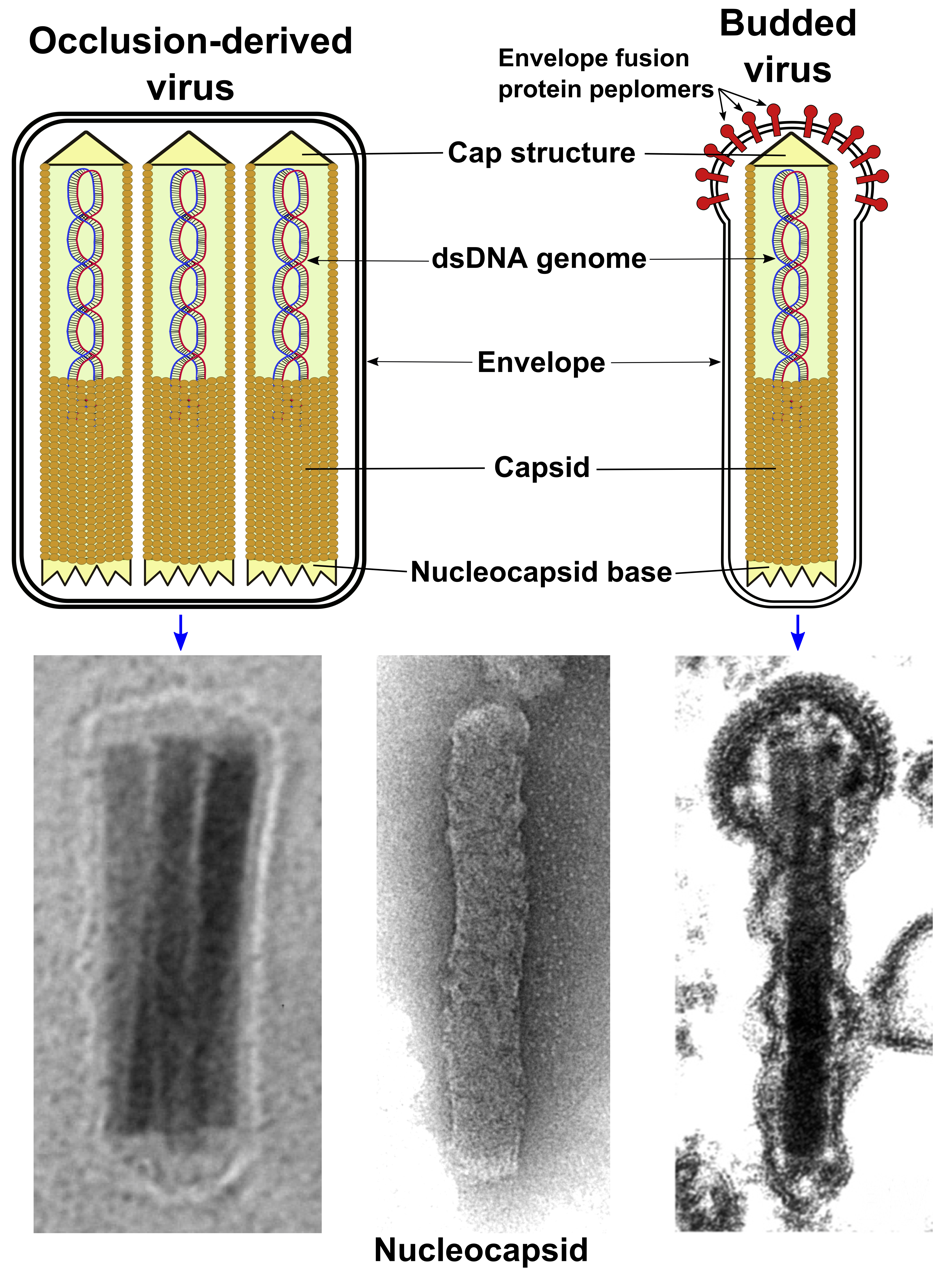
- Baculovirus virions and nucleocapsids

Virus classification
- (unranked): Virus
- Class: Naldaviricetes
- Order: Lefavirales
- Family: Baculoviridae

Genera
- Alphabaculovirus; Betabaculovirus; Deltabaculovirus; Gammabaculovirus

= Baculoviridae =

Family of viruses

Baculoviridae is a family of viruses. Arthropods, among the most studied being Lepidoptera, Hymenoptera and Diptera, serve as natural hosts. Currently, 85 species are placed in this family, assigned to four genera.

Baculoviruses are known to infect insects, with over 600 host species having been described. Immature (larval) forms of lepidopteran species (moths and butterflies) are the most common hosts, but these viruses have also been found infecting sawflies, and mosquitoes. Although baculoviruses are capable of entering mammalian cells in culture, they are not known to be capable of replication in mammalian or other vertebrate animal cells.

Starting in the 1940s, they were used and studied widely as biopesticides in crop fields. Baculoviruses contain a circular, double-stranded DNA (dsDNA) genome ranging from 80 to 180 kbp.

== Historical influence ==
The earliest records of baculoviruses can be found in the literature from as early as the 16th century in reports of "wilting disease" infecting silkworm larvae. Starting in the 1940s, the viruses were used and studied widely as biopesticides in crop fields. Since the 1990s, they have been employed to produce complex eukaryotic proteins in insect cell cultures (see Sf21, High Five cells). These recombinant proteins have been used in research and as vaccines in both human and veterinary medical treatments (for example, the most widely used vaccine for prevention of H5N1 avian influenza in chickens was produced in a baculovirus expression vector). More recently, baculoviruses were found to transduce mammalian cells with a suitable promoter.

== Baculovirus lifecycle ==
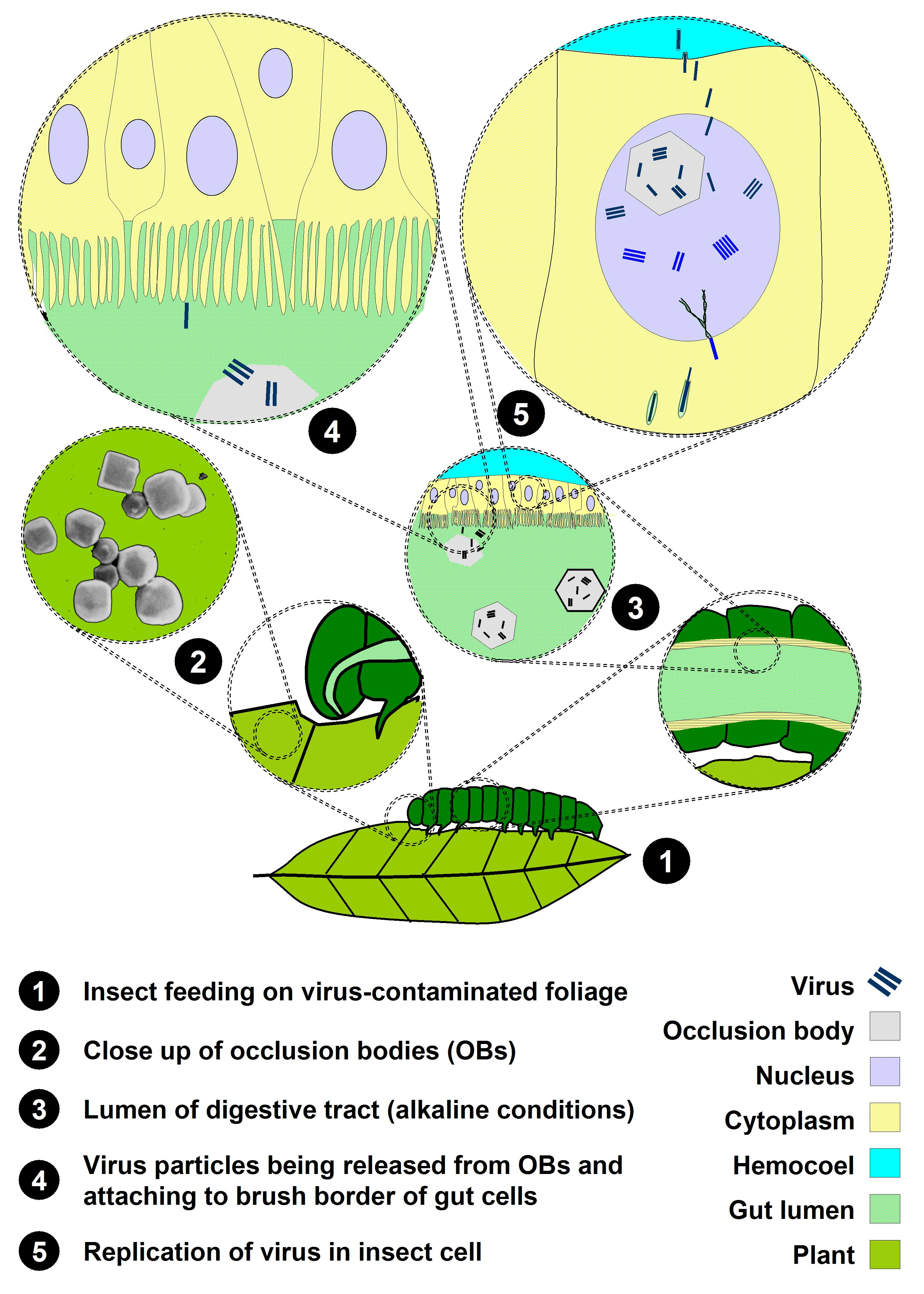
Diagram of a NPV lifecycle

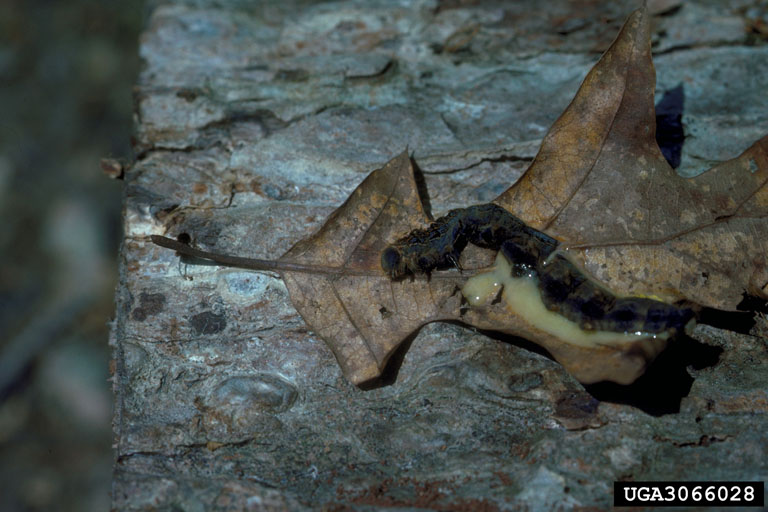
A dead caterpillar infected by NPV

The baculovirus lifecycle involves two distinct forms of virus. Occlusion-derived virus (ODV) is present in a protein matrix (polyhedrin or granulin) and is responsible for the primary infection of the host, while the budded virus (BV) is released from the infected host cells later during the secondary infection.

Baculoviruses have very species-specific tropisms among the invertebrates with over 700 host species having been described. Immature (larval) forms of lepidopteran species are the most common hosts, but these viruses have also been found infecting sawflies and mosquitoes. Reports of baculovirus infections of shrimp and beetles (e.g. Oryctes rhinocerus) were found to be nudiviruses, a closely related lineage to the baculoviruses.

Typically, the initial infection occurs when a susceptible host insect feeds on plants that are contaminated with the occluded form of the virus. The protein matrix dissolves in the alkaline environment of the host midgut (stomach), releasing ODVs that then fuse to the columnar epithelial cell membranes of the host intestine and are taken into the cell in endosomes. Nucleocapsids escape from the endosomes and are transported to nucleus. This step is possibly mediated by actin filaments. Viral transcription and replication occur in the cell nucleus and new BV particles are budded out from the basolateral side to spread the infection systemically. During budding, BV acquires a loosely fitting host cell membrane with expressed and displayed viral glycoproteins.

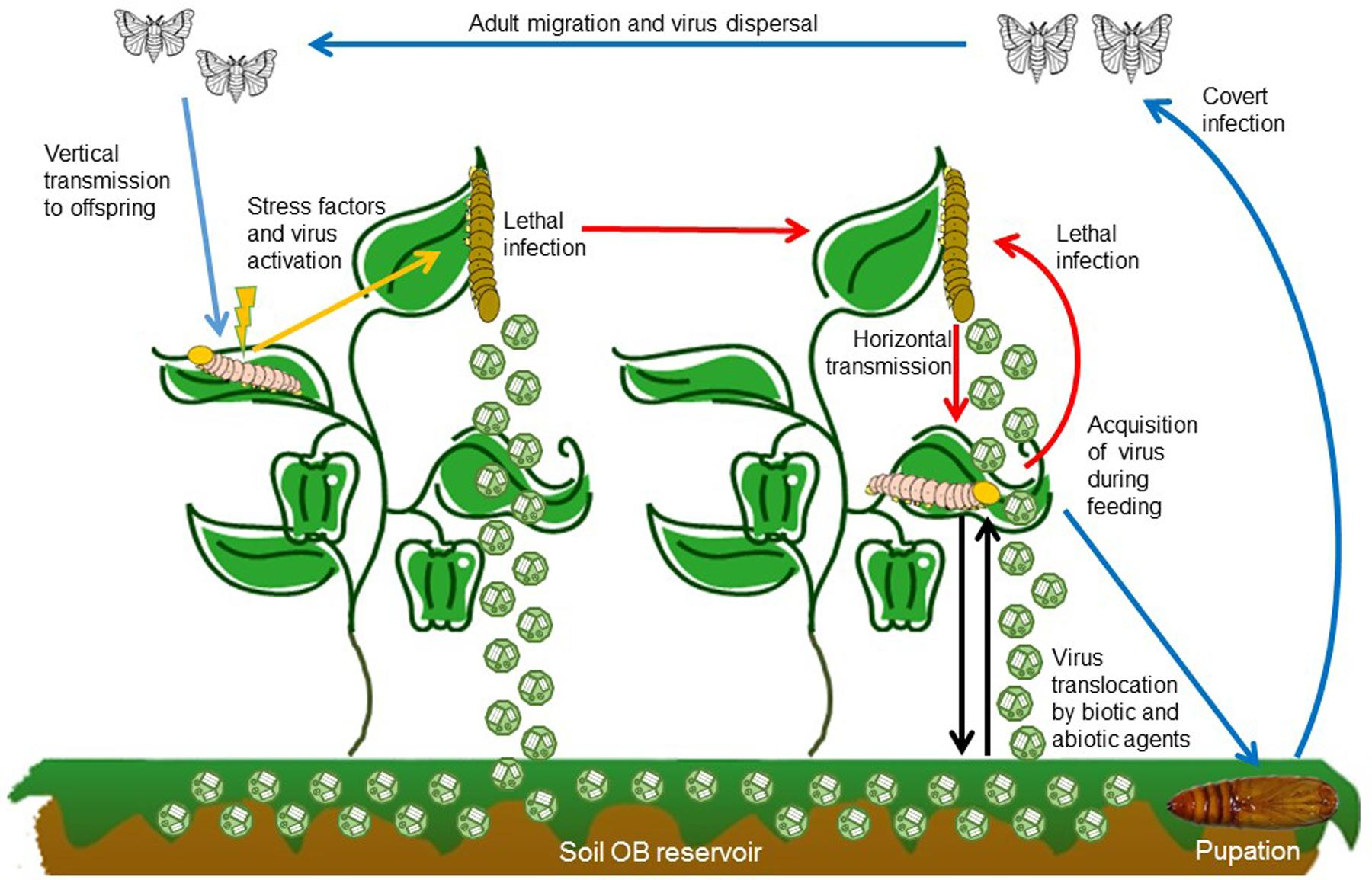
Baculovirus dispersal pathways in the environment

After baculovirus infection, three distinct phases occur:

- Early (0–6 h),
- Late (6–24 h)
- Very late phase (18–24 to 72 h)

While BV is produced in the late phase, the ODV form is produced in the very late phase, acquiring the envelope from host cell nucleus and embedded in the matrix of occlusion body protein. These occlusion bodies are released when cells lyse to further spread baculovirus infection to next host. The extensive lysis of cells frequently causes the host insect to literally disintegrate, thus the reason for the historic name "wilting disease". The complete ODV-polyhedrin particles are resistant to heat and light inactivation, whereas the naked BV virion is more sensitive to environment.

When infecting a caterpillar, the advanced stages of infection cause the host to feed without resting, and then to climb to the higher parts of trees, including exposed places they would normally avoid due to the risk of predators. This is an advantage for the virus since (when the host dissolves) it can drip down onto leaves, which will be consumed by new hosts.

== Transmissibility ==
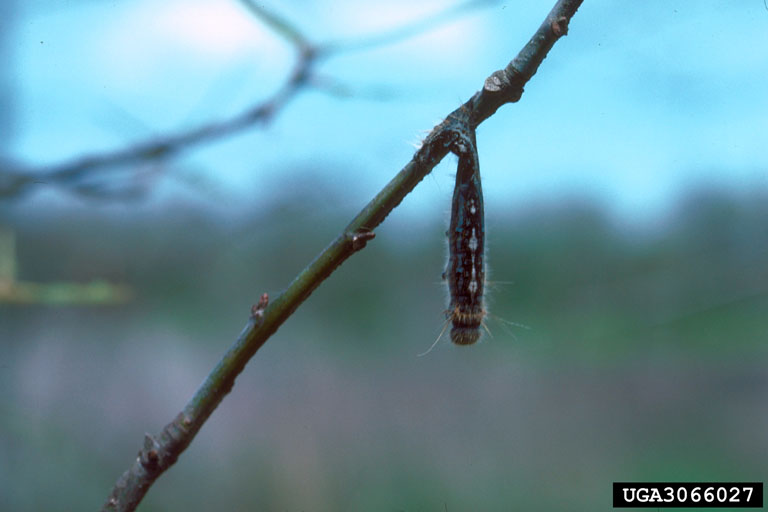
Another victim of the nuclear polyhedrosis virus

The virus is unable to infect humans in the way it does insects, because human stomachs are acid-based and NPV requires an alkaline digestive system in order to replicate. It is possible for the virus crystals to enter human cells, but not to replicate to the point of causing illness.

== Structure of the virion ==
Diagram of a nucleopolyhedrovirus

The most studied baculovirus is Autographa californica multicapsid nucleopolyhedrovirus (AcMNPV). The virus was originally isolated from the alfalfa looper (a lepidopteran) and contains a 134 kbp genome with 154 open reading frames. The major capsid protein VP39 together with some minor proteins forms the nucleocapsid (21 nm x 260 nm) that encloses the DNA with p6.9 protein. Using cryo–electron microscopy, it has been shown that the major capsid protein VP39 forms a covalently cross-linked helical tube protecting a highly compacted 134-kilobase pair DNA genome. The ends of the tube are sealed by the base and cap substructures, which share a 126-subunit hub but differ in components that promote actin tail–mediated propulsion and nuclear entry of the nucleocapsid, respectively.

The fold of VP39 is novel and is unrelated to those of major capsid proteins encoded by non-baculo-like dsDNA viruses that belond to realms Varidnaviria and Duplodnaviria. The N terminus of VP39 contains a CCCH zinc finger motif with an unusual extension in the “knuckle” turn of the zinc finger containing the first two cysteines. This extension has a structural role as it projects away from the main body of the major capsid protein to form a interdimer disulfide bond between two Cys29 residues from neighboring VP39 strands in the nucleocapsid.

BV acquires its envelope from the cell membrane and requires a glycoprotein, gp64, to be able to spread systemic infection. This protein forms structures called peplomers on one end of the budded virus particle, but is not found on ODVs (although several other proteins are only associated with the ODV form). Some differences also exist in the lipid composition of the viral envelope of the two forms. While the BV envelope consists of phosphatidylserine, ODV contains phosphatidylcholine and phosphatidylethanolamine.

A nucleocapsid assembly-essential element (NAE) was identified in the AcMNPV genome. The NAE is an internal cis-element within the ac83 gene. The nucleocapsid assembly is not dependent on the ac83 protein product.

== Major envelope glycoprotein gp64 ==
During periods of evolution, the baculoviral envelope glycoproteins have undergone changes. Ld130, also known as baculovirus F-protein from Lymantria dispar (LdMNPV) is suggested to be an ancestral envelope fusion protein which has been replaced by non-orthologous gene replacement with gp64 in AcMNPV, Bombyx mori (BmNPV) and Orgyia pseudotsugata (OpMNPV) while they still retain the ld130 gene.

Gp64 is a homotrimeric membrane glycoprotein that is polarly present on the rod-shaped virion. It consists of 512 amino acids (aa) with four glycosylation sites at asparagine residues and has a N-terminal signal sequence (20 aa), oligomerization and fusion domain and a hydrophobic transmembrane domain near the C-terminus (7 aa).

It is produced in both early and late phases of the infection cycle with a maximal rate of synthesis occurring in 24–26 h after infection. Trimerization with intermolecular cysteine-bonds seems to be a crucial step for protein transport to cell surface, since only 33% of synthesized protein reaches cell surface, as monomeric gp64 is degraded within the cells.

Gp64 is essential for efficient budding of the virion and for the cell-to-cell transmission during the infection cycle, as well as viral entry, i.e. causing viral trophism and endosome-mediated uptake to the cell. The major function of the gp64 envelope protein is to cause the pH-mediated envelope fusion to the endosome. Although gp64 has variety of essential functions, it has been reported that gp64-null baculoviruses can be substituted with other viral glycoproteins such as Ld130, G-protein of Vesicular stomatitis virus. These substitutions will result in functional virions.

== Applications ==
Baculovirus expression in insect cells represents a robust method for producing recombinant glycoproteins or membrane proteins. In the early 1990s, a system was developed by Monsanto that allows for easy and fast generation of recombinant baculoviruses. Baculovirus-produced proteins have been in use since 2007 as vaccines against human papillomavirus infection, successfully protecting against cervical cancer. Baculovirus-produced proteins are currently under study as therapeutic cancer vaccines with several immunologic advantages over proteins derived from mammalian sources.

Lymantria dispar (commonly known as the spongy moth), a serious pest of forest trees, has been successfully contained by releasing spongy moth baculovirus (NPV) preparations. Certain species of sawfly (Neodiprion sertifer, N. lecontei, N. pratti pratti, etc.), have also been successfully controlled by NPV treatments specific to them.

Members of the genus Heliothis—cosmopolitan insects that attack at least 30 food- and fibre-yielding crop plants—have been controlled by the application of Baculovirus heliothis. In 1975, the United States Environmental Protection Agency registered the B. heliothis preparations.

NPV preparations have also been used commercially against pests such as Trichoplusia (under the biotrol-VTN brand name) and the cotton leafworm (under the biotrol-VSE brand name).

== Biosafety ==
Baculoviruses are incapable of replicating within the cells of mammals and plants. They have a restricted range of hosts they can infect that is typically restricted to a limited number of closely related insect species. Because baculoviruses are not harmful to humans, they are considered a safe option for use in research applications. They are also used as biological agents as in the case of the Indian mealmoth, a grain-feeding pest. However, in the scope of biosafety, it must be considered that baculoviruses are harmful, if not lethal to insect populations, as described above. Therefore, their usage should preferably occur in controlled settings limiting the dissemination into the environment.

== Taxonomy ==
The name of this family has been derived from the Latin word baculus, meaning "stick". The family has been divided into four genera: Alphabaculovirus (lepidopteran-specific nucleopolyhedroviruses), Betabaculovirus (lepidopteran-specific granuloviruses), Gammabaculovirus (hymenopteran-specific nucleopolyhedroviruses), and Deltabaculovirus (dipteran-specific nucleopolyhedroviruses).

=== Nuclear polyhedrosis virus ===
Nuclear Polyhedrosis Virus (NPV) was once listed by the International Committee on Taxonomy of Viruses as a subgenus of Eubaculovirinae, but the term now refers to 35 species of the family Baculoviridae, mostly alphabaculoviruses, but also one deltabaculovirus and two gammabaculoviruses.

The polyhedral capsid from which the virus gets its name is an extremely stable protein crystal that protects the virus in the external environment. It dissolves in the alkaline midgut of moths and butterflies to release the virus particle and infect the larva. An example of an insect that it infects is the fall webworm.

== Evolution ==
Baculoviruses are thought to have evolved from the Nudiviridae family of viruses 310 million years ago.

== See also ==
- Cypovirus
- BacMam
- The Cobra Event
- Pancrustacea – clade including natural hosts of the viruses
- Early 35 kDa protein
- Polyhedrosis (disambiguation)
