= Novaluron =

Chemical compound

Clinical data
- Trade names: Rimon

Legal status
- Legal status: In general: legal

Pharmacokinetic data
- Bioavailability: ~100%
- Metabolism: 90-95%
- Elimination half-life: 1-4 h
- Excretion: Kidney, renal

Identifiers
- IUPAC name: N-[[3-Chloro-4-[1,1,2-trifluoro-2-(trifluoromethoxy)ethoxy]phenyl]carbamoyl]-2,6-difluorobenzamide
- CAS Number: 116714-46-6
- PubChem CID: 93541
- ChemSpider: 84442
- UNII: Z8H1B3CW0B
- KEGG: C18875
- ChEMBL: ChEMBL1869031
- CompTox Dashboard (EPA): DTXSID5034773
- ECHA InfoCard: 100.129.652

Chemical and physical data
- Formula: C_{17}H_{9}ClF_{8}N_{2}O_{4}
- Molar mass: 492.71 g·mol^{−1}
- 3D model (JSmol): Interactive image
- Density: 1.560 g/cm^{3} (22 °C) g/cm^{3}
- Melting point: 178 °C (352 °F)
- Solubility in water: 3 × 10^{−6} mg/mL (20 °C)
- SMILES: C1=CC(=C(C(=C1)F)C(NC(NC2=CC(=C(C=C2)OC([C@@H](F)OC(F)(F)F)(F)F)Cl)=O)=O)F
- InChI: InChI=1S/C17H9ClF8N2O4/c18-8-6-7(4-5-11(8)31-16(22,23)14(21)32-17(24,25)26)27-15(30)28-13(29)12-9(19)2-1-3-10(12)20/h1-6,14H,(H2,27,28,29,30)

Novaluron, or (±)-1-[3-chloro-4-(1,1,2-trifluoro-2-trifluoro- methoxyethoxy)phenyl]-3-(2,6-difluorobenzoyl)urea, is a chemical with pesticide properties, belonging to the class of insecticides called insect growth regulators. It is a benzoylphenyl urea developed by Makhteshim-Agan Industries Ltd.. In the United States, the compound has been used on food crops, including apples, potatoes, brassicas, ornamentals, and cotton. Patents and registrations have been approved or are ongoing in several other countries throughout Europe, Asia, Africa, South America, and Australia. The US Environmental Protection Agency and the Canadian Pest Management Regulatory Agency consider novaluron to pose low risk to the environment and non-target organisms and value it as an important option for integrated pest management that should decrease reliance on organophosphorus, carbamate and pyrethroid insecticides.

== History ==
=== Legislation ===
In the European Union, a registration application was filed in 2001, but in 2007 there was still no definitive agreement regarding the legal status of novaluron. Member states of the European Union were allowed to award temporary permits for products based on novaluron. On April 4, 2012, a decision was disclosed which discontinued permits for the use of novaluron, to be executed on October 3. The development of the legal status of novaluron in Japan is condensed in the timeline below.

=== Timeline of approval in Japan ===
Date	Action
November 28, 2001	Registration application submitted
October 29, 2003	Minister of Health, Labor and Welfare requests health risk assessment in line with establishment of residue standard
November 6, 2003	18th meeting of Food Safety Commission (explanation of MHLW’s request outline)
November 12, 2003	2nd meeting of Pesticides Expert Committee
November 20, 2003	20th meeting of Food Safety Commission (reporting of discussion results from the Pesticides Expert Committee meeting)
November 20 to December 17, 2003	Public comments
December 24, 2003	Finalized

== Synthesis ==
Novaluron can be synthesized in a four-step reaction process. First, 2-chloro-4-nitrophenol is converted into chloro-4-aminophenol through a reduction reaction. After this first step, an addition reaction with perfluoro-vinyl-perfluoro-methyl ether is conducted to synthesize 3-chloro-4-[1,1,2-trifluoro2-(trifluoromethoxy)-ethoxy]aniline. The next step in the process is the production of 2,6-difluorobenzoyl isocyanate in an acylation reaction using 2,6-difluorobenzamide and oxalyl dichloride. The final part of the synthesis of novaluron is an addition reaction with 3-chloro-4-[1,1,2-trifluoro-2-(trifluoromethoxy)-ethoxy]aniline.

== Reactivity and mechanism of action ==
The exact mechanism of action of novaluron has not been extensively researched, but the general mechanisms and effects common to benzoylphenyl ureas apply. The compound inhibits chitin formation, targeting specifically larval insect stages that actively synthesize chitin. The adults of non-target species are seldom affected. Benzoylphenyl ureas, including novaluron, do not inhibit chitin synthesis in cell free systems or block the chitin biosynthetic pathway in intact larvae. The precise biochemical activity of these compounds, that gives them their insecticidal activity, has not yet been elucidated. The most likely hypothesis is that benzoylphenyl ureas interrupt the in vivo synthesis and transport of specific proteins required for assemblage of polymeric chitin.

== Metabolism ==
After oral administration in rats, novaluron treated with chlorophenyl-14C, only about 6-7% of the administered dose was absorbed after a single low dose (2 mg per kilogram bodyweight). A single high dose (1000 mg per kilogram bodyweight) caused an absorption that was 10-fold less. In another experiment [difluorophenyl-14C(U)]novaluron caused an absorption of approximately 20%, but this number may be an overestimate due to cleavage of novaluron in the gastrointestinal tract. Through whole-body autoradiography it was demonstrated that the concentrations of radioactivity were highest in the kidneys, liver, fat tissues, pancreas and in the mesenteric lymph nodes, while the lowest concentrations appeared to be in the thymus, eyes, brain, testes, bone, muscles, and blood.

== Biotransformation ==
In a study of absorption, distribution, metabolism (biotransformation) and excretion of novaluron, rats received radioactively labeled novaluron orally. The absorbed novaluron was metabolized and 14 and 15 components were detected in the urine and bile respectively. The main metabolic pathway was cleavage of the urea bridge between the chlorophenyl- and difluorophenylgroups. The products of this reaction are 2,6-difluorobenzoic acid and 3-chloro-4-(1,1,2-trifluoro-2-trifluoromethoxyethoxy) aniline. Most of the radioactivity consisted of unchanged novaluron. The parent compound was also the major component present in extracts from fat, liver and kidneys. The proposed metabolic pathway is shown in the adjacent image.

== Efficacy ==
Benzoylphenyl ureas have provided consistently good results when applied properly against certain susceptible pests. Novaluron in particular has been shown to have insecticidal activity against several important pests. Bioactivity of novaluron is usually much greater than that of insecticides diflubenzuron and teflubenzuron and the compound is at least as active as other insecticides from its developmental generation, for example chlorofluazuron and lufenuron. In comparison to other benzoylphenyl ureas, novaluron demonstrates improved contact toxicity, while the probable mechanism of action remains the same.

Novaluron has been shown to be highly active against a number of common pests, such as the Colorado potato beetle, whiteflies, African cotton leafworm, and cotton bollworm. Organisms that are closely related to these animals seem to share this susceptibility to the compound. A notable exception to this is a study evaluating the efficacy of various insecticides on the stem borers Diatraea saccharalis and Eoreuma loftini, in which the results seemed to indicate that these organisms were not susceptible to novaluron.

== Toxicity ==
The Joint FAO/WHO Meeting on Pesticide Residues (JMPR) concluded that novaluron is unlikely to be carcinogenic to humans. Furthermore, it concluded that it is not a developmental toxicant. The organization established an ADI (Acceptable Daily Ingestion) of 0-0.01 mg/kg of body weight, because of the NOAEL (No Observed Adverse Effect Level) of 1.1 mg/kg of body weight per day for erythrocyte damage and secondary splenic and liver changes. This was established in a 2-year study in rats.

Novaluron has low to moderate acute toxicity. The toxicity for oral administration and inhalation is of Toxicity Category IV and for the dermal route is the toxicity of Toxicity Category III(see Toxicity category rating). Furthermore, it is not an eye and dermal irritant and it is not a skin sensitizer.

Human exposure studies concluded that novaluron causes substantial but temporary eye injury. It can also be harmful if the compound is absorbed through the skin. Contact with skin, eyes or clothing should therefore be avoided. Prolonged or frequently repeated skin contact may cause allergic reactions in some individuals.

== Effects on animals ==
In a sub chronic rat oral study, mortality, clinical signs, body weights, food consumption and efficiency, urinalysis and gross pathology were unaffected by novaluron. At 2000 ppm, cumulative body weight gains were observed and some histopathological changes in the spleens were noted; however, these effects were not statistically significant. Based on these histopathological parameters in the spleen, the no observed adverse effect level (NOAEL) was estimated to be 8.3 mg/kg/day while the lowest observed adverse effect level (LOAEL) was 818.5 mg/kg/day.

A 28-day rat dermal toxicity study was conducted to evaluate dermal exposure, the route most directly applicable to the indoor use on ornamentals grown in containers. No systematic effects were noted up to a dose of 1000 mg/kg/day and no maternal or developmental toxicity was noted. Based on available studies, there is also no concern for mutagenicity of novaluron in animals. Indications have been found that novaluron is bioaccumulative, and that it could provide risks for invertebrate aquatic animals, but studies are inconclusive.
