= Agriculture in Greece =

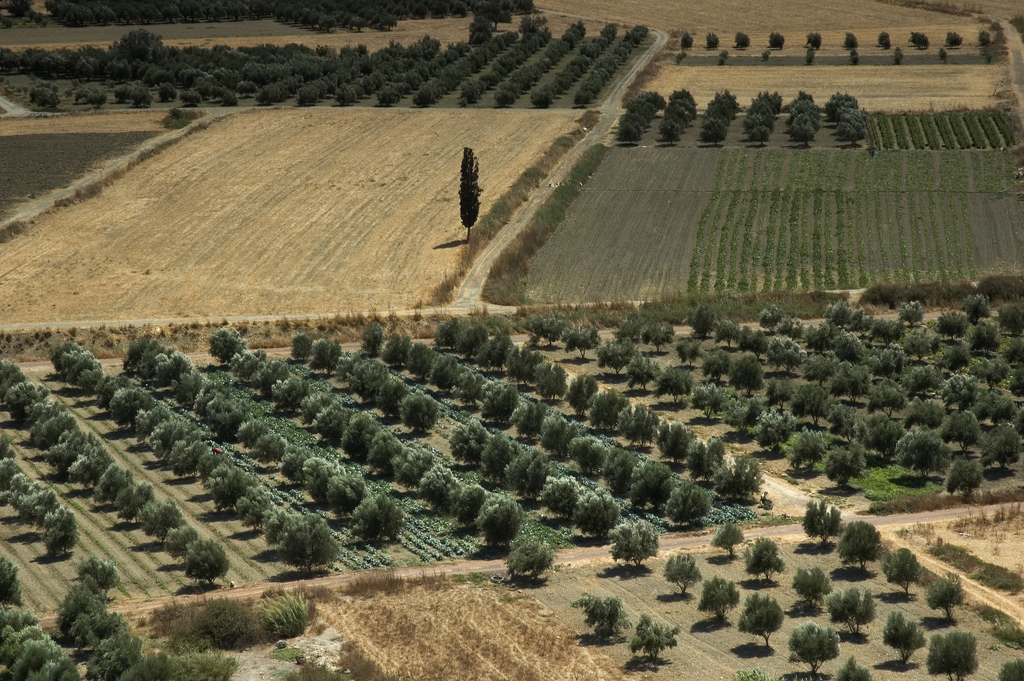
Valley of Messara, Crete

Agriculture in Greece is deeply rooted in history, and based on its Mediterranean climate. This practice encompasses a wide array of crops, including olives, grapes, citrus fruits, cereals, and vegetables, with a notable emphasis on olive oil production, establishing Greece as a global leader in this industry. The country's vineyards produce tons of grapes and also yield renowned wines. Greece also produces a wide variety of livestock products. Fisheries are playing an important role while forestry plays a secondary role.

Greek agriculture is based on small, family-owned dispersed units. Currently, 47,9% of agricultural land is arable land, 27,4% is composed of tree plantations, 2,1% is composed of vines and 22,4% is composed of other cultivations (mostly used as pasture land). Greek agriculture employs 615,000 farmers, 12,4% of the total labor force. It produces more than 4,2% of the national GDP, occupies 2.824.449 hectares of land and is the main source of occupation for the majority of rural areas in the country.

== Current production ==
Currently, Greek agriculture like other countries of the European Union is heavily subsidized by the Common Agricultural Policy (CAP). Certain deductions of subsidies are planned within the next decade.

Greece produced in 2018:

- 1.2 million tons of maize;
- 1 million tons of olive (5th largest producer in the world, behind Spain, Italy, Morocco and Turkey);
- 1 million tons of wheat;
- 968 thousand tons of peach (3rd largest producer in the world, behind China and Italy);
- 933 thousand tons of grape (19th largest producer in the world);
- 913 thousand tons of orange (17th largest producer in the world);
- 837 thousand tons of cotton; (1st largest producer in the EU);
- 835 thousand tons of tomatoes;
- 630 thousand tons of watermelon;
- 465 thousand tons of potato;
- 353 thousand tons of sugar beet;
- 344 thousand tons of barley;
- 285 thousand tons of apple;
- 265 thousand tons of kiwi (5th largest producer in the world, behind China, Italy, New Zealand and Iran);

In addition to smaller productions of other agricultural products.

== Modern history ==
=== 19th century ===
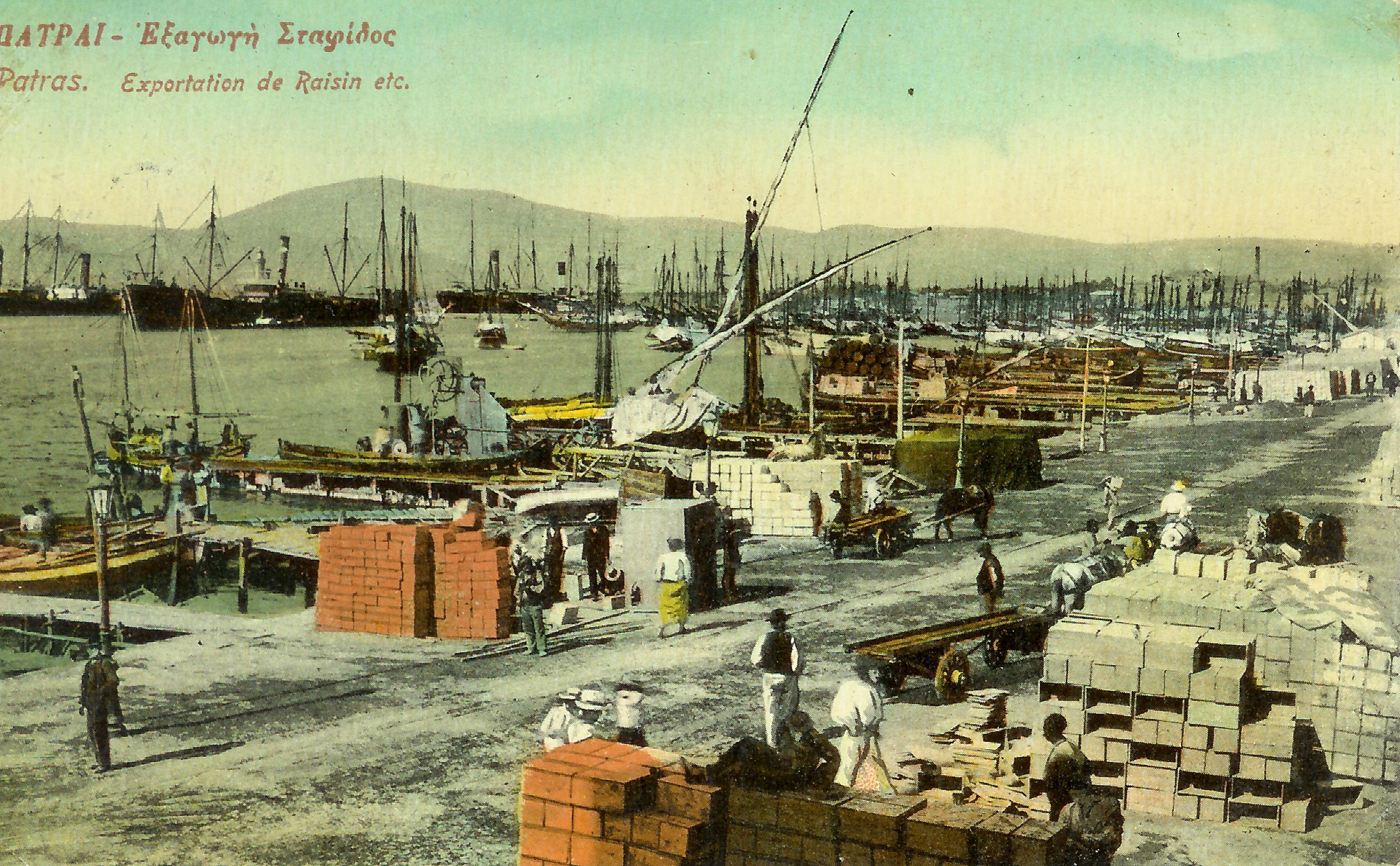
Exportation of raisin; port of Patras, late 19th century

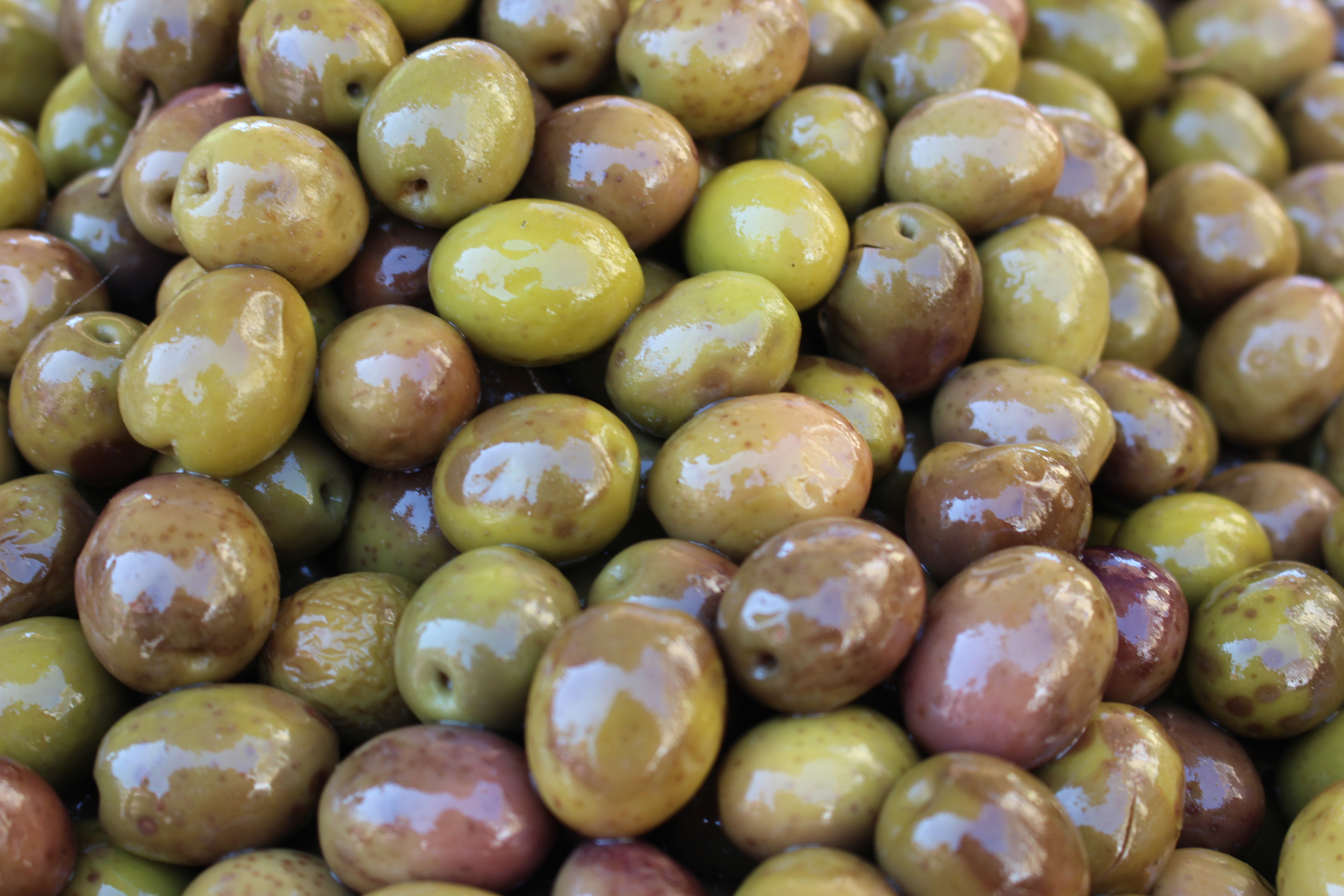
Greek green olives

In the 19th century, Greek agriculture was very basic. Implements found in western Europe had not yet appeared. The following description was reported by William Henry Moffett, American Consul in Athens and was published in the American periodical Garden and Forest (Volume 2, Issue 95, 18 December 1889, p. 612: published by Garden and Forest Publishing Co., Tribune Building, New York, N.Y.):

William H. Moffett, United States Consul at Athens, reports the impossibility of making any official statement as to the agriculture of Greece, because "agriculture is here in the most undeveloped condition. Even in the immediate neighborhood of Athens it is common to find the wooden plow and the rude mattock which were in use 2,000 years ago. Fields are plowed up or scratched over, and crops replanted season after season, until the exhausted soil will bear no more. Fertilizers are not used to any appreciable extent, and the farm implements are of the very rudest description. Irrigation is in use in some districts, and, as far as I can ascertain, the methods in use can be readily learned by a study of the practices of the ancient Egyptians. Greece has olives and grapes in abundance, and of quality not excelled; but Greek olive oil and Greek wine will not bear transportation."

The above statements and views by the U.S. Consul certainly do not represent a complete, scientific evaluation of the state of Greek agriculture at the time, especially on a comparative level with other countries. An indirect measure of the relative productivity in the country is provided by the fact that in the mid-19th century, the average Greek had about two-thirds of the purchasing power of the average French.

Modernization of agriculture was rapid in European countries during the 19th century, with more advanced equipment replacing traditional methods, and Greece was no exception. In Greece, this was particularly connected with the expansion of manufacture (mainly in the city of Volos) and usage of more complex metal agricultural implements and other equipment.

=== 20th century ===
Greek agricultural production was vastly expanded in the 20th century, as per the information given elsewhere on this page. In particular grain production (wheat, barley, etc.) has been significantly increased using more modern farming methods. Much of the research on soil classification, fertiliser use, and dissemination of improved agricultural practice was carried out starting from 1938 in the Kanellopoulos Institute of Chemistry and Agriculture.

The main varieties of domestic wheat produced in Greece during 2002 were FLAVIO, VAVAROS and MEXA.

In 2020 Greece had 530,679 farms, a 26,6% decrease from 2009 when it had 723,006 farms. 12,588 of those were certified organic or under conversion, a decrease of 23,5% from 2009 when organic farms amounted to 16,448, but at the same time the number of hectares certified as organic increased by 19,3% from 130.828 hectares in 2009 to 156.058 hectares in 2020.

== Notable products ==
Notable products include:

- Avgotaracho of Messolonghi
- Zante currant
- Greek wine
- Fava Santorinis
- Firiki Piliou
- Santorini tomato
- Krokos Kozanis (saffron)
- Menalou honey
- Florina pepper
- Rodi Ermionis
- Mastic (plant resin) of Chios
- Tobacco production (region of Macedonia)
- Tropical fruits (such as bananas and avocados) in Crete
- Carob

=== Olive cultivars/varieties ===
- Note: The below list is not considered exhaustive.

Name	Image	Areas	Description
Adramitini			
Amfissas			Alternate name is Amphissis
Amigdalolia			
Athinolia			Low viscosity
Chemlali			
Conservolia			
Daphnoelia			
Frantoio			
Gordal			
Chalkidikis		Chalkidiki	Green olives. Also known as Chondrolia and called "donkey olives". They have PDO status.
Hondroelia			
Karidolia			
Kalamatas		Messinia in Southern Peloponnese.	Usually a brown or black table olive. When picked early, known as "pink" olives (reddish color). They have PDO status for the Kalamata region. Known as "Kalamon olives" outside this region.
Koroneiki		Messinia, Peloponnese, and Zakynthos.	Cretan olives, referred also as elitses
Kothreiki			
Lianolia			
Mastoidís			
Megaritiki			
Mirtolia		Mainly Laconia	Also Smertolia/Mourtolia
Nafpliou		Valley of Argos in the Eastern Peloponnese peninsula.	Usually a table olive
Patrinia		Primarily in Aigialeia.	High oil concentration of around 25%
Picholine			Also Marocaine
Throubes or from Thassos		Island of Thassos	Naturally wrinkled when ripe and allowed to fall into nets. The only olives that can be eaten straight off the tree.
Throumbolia			
Tsounati (Ladolia)			
Valanolia			

== Gallery ==
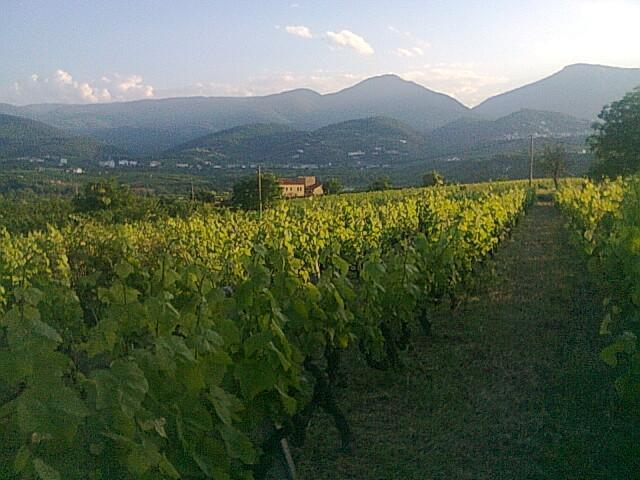
Vineyard in Naoussa, central Macedonia

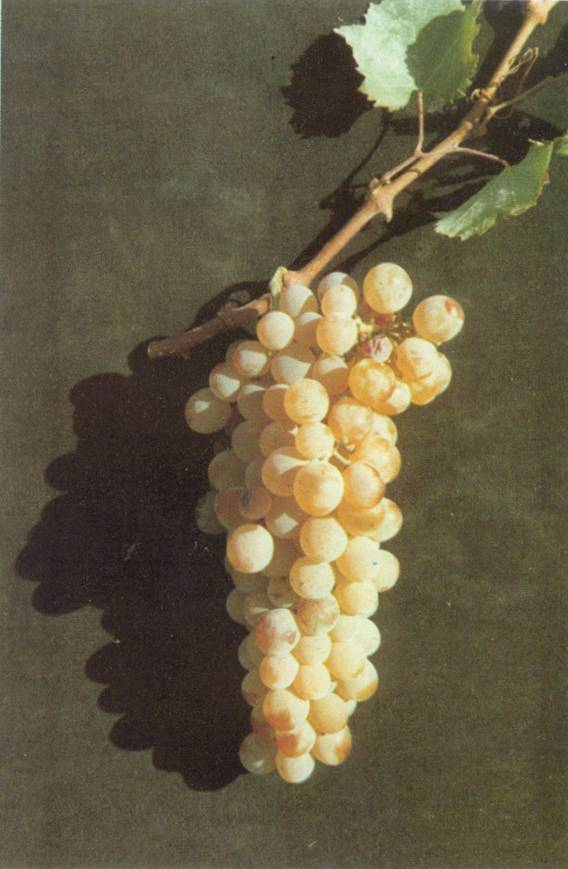
Assyrtiko grapes

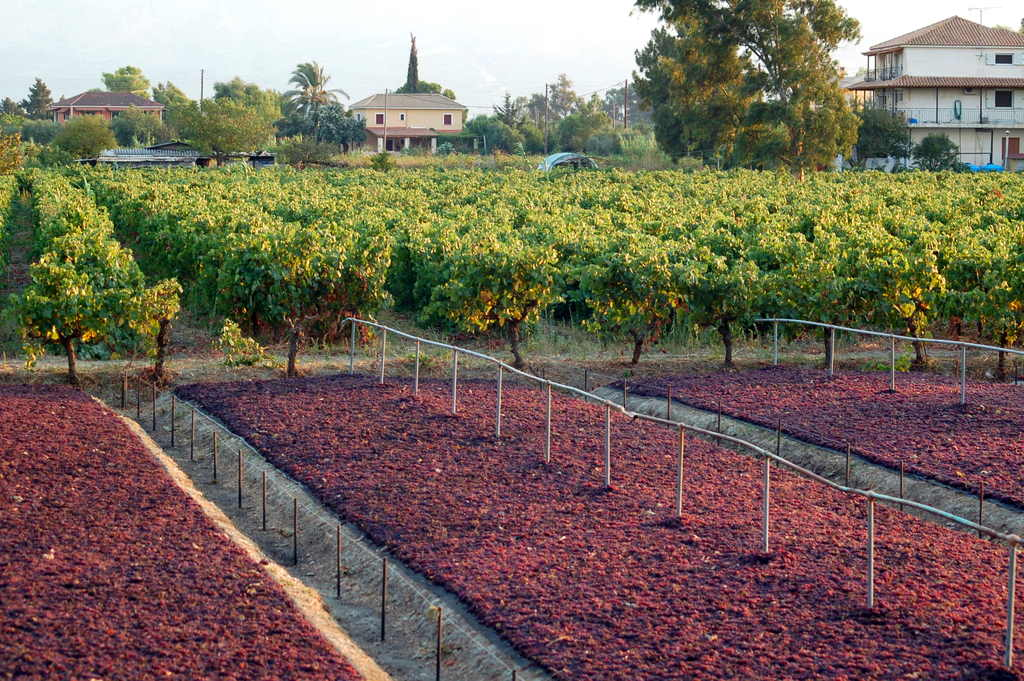
Sun-drying of Zante currant on Zakynthos

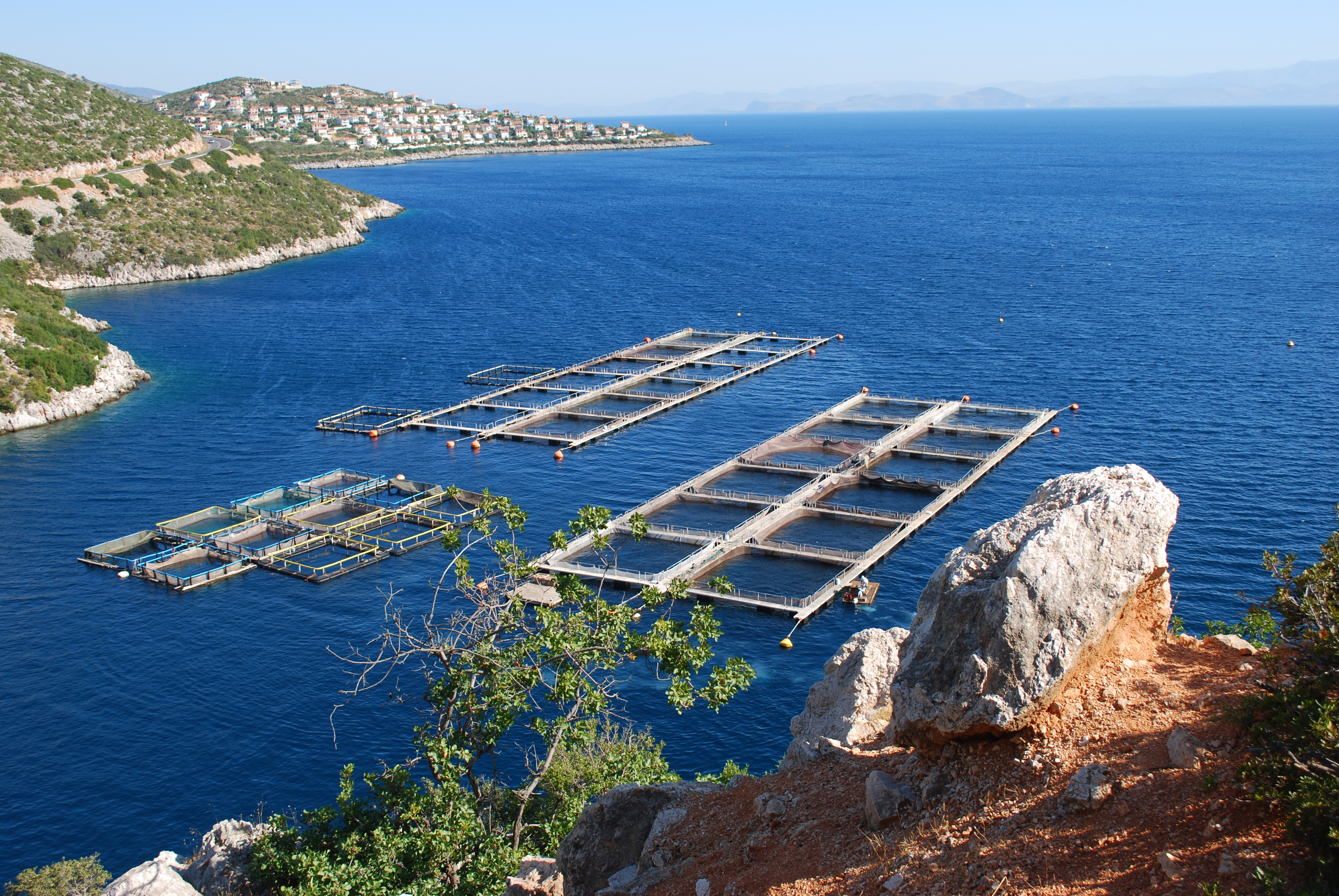
Fish farming, Argolic gulf

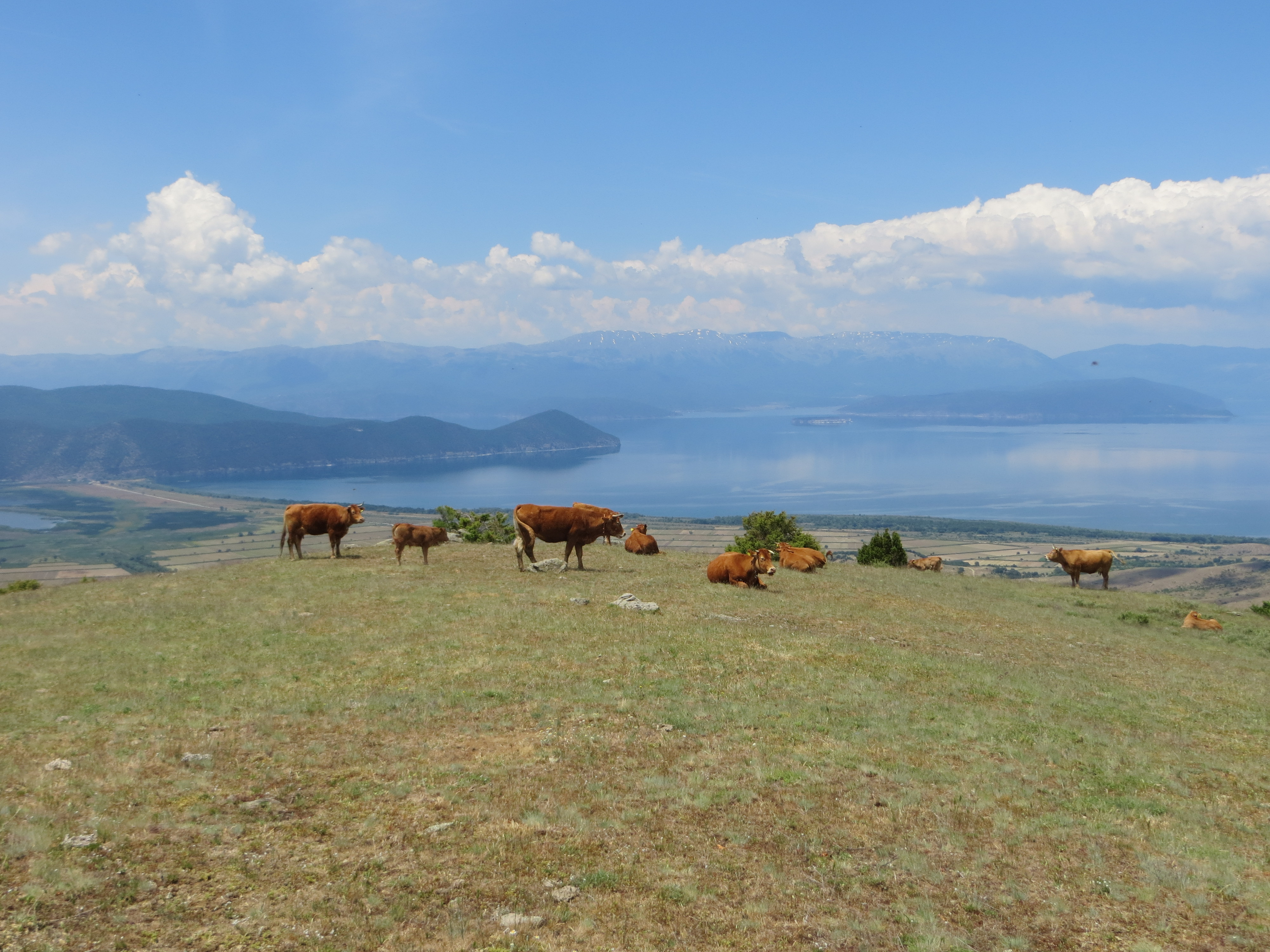
Cattle in Prespes

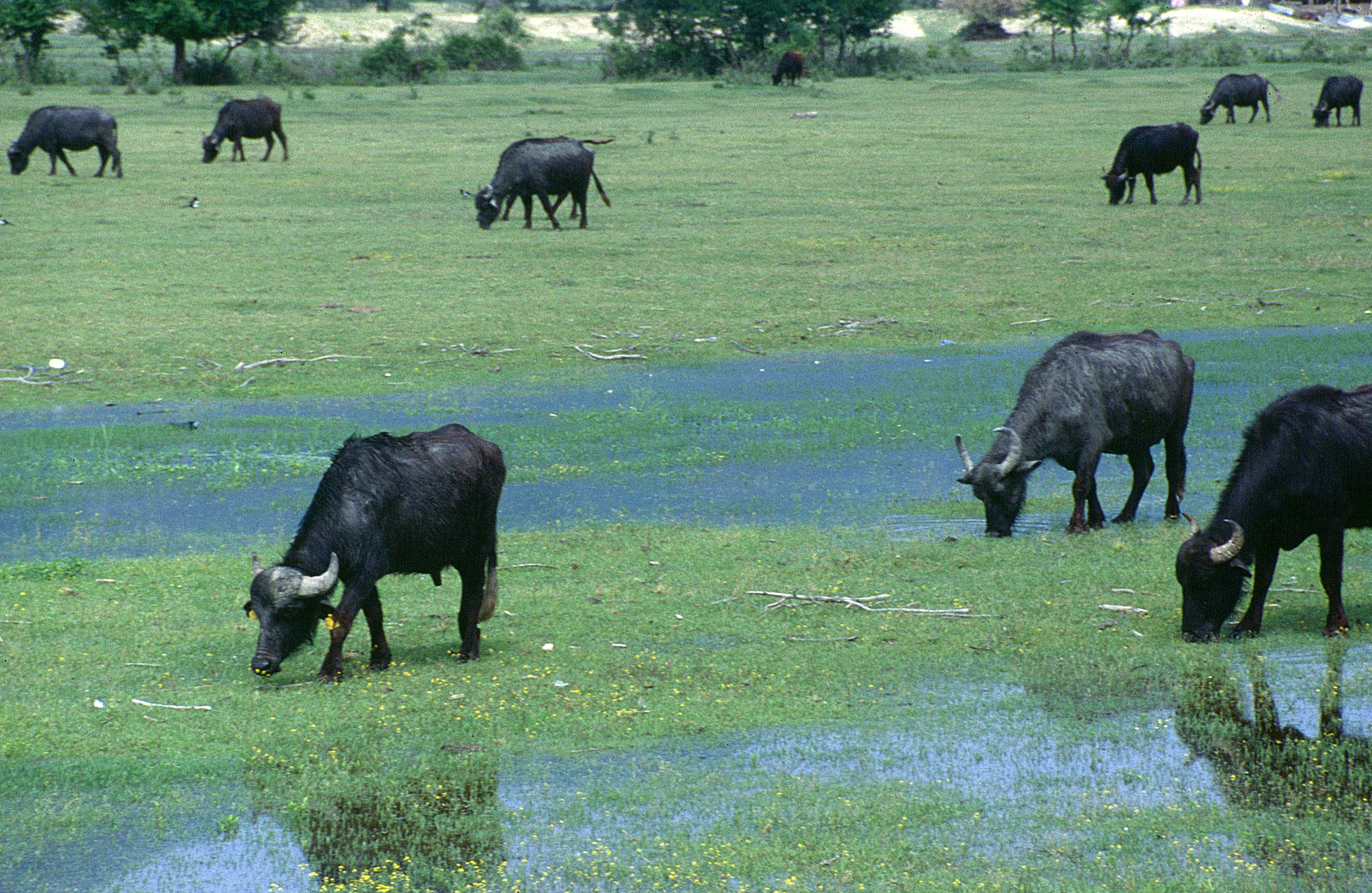
Buffalos breeding, Lake Kerkini

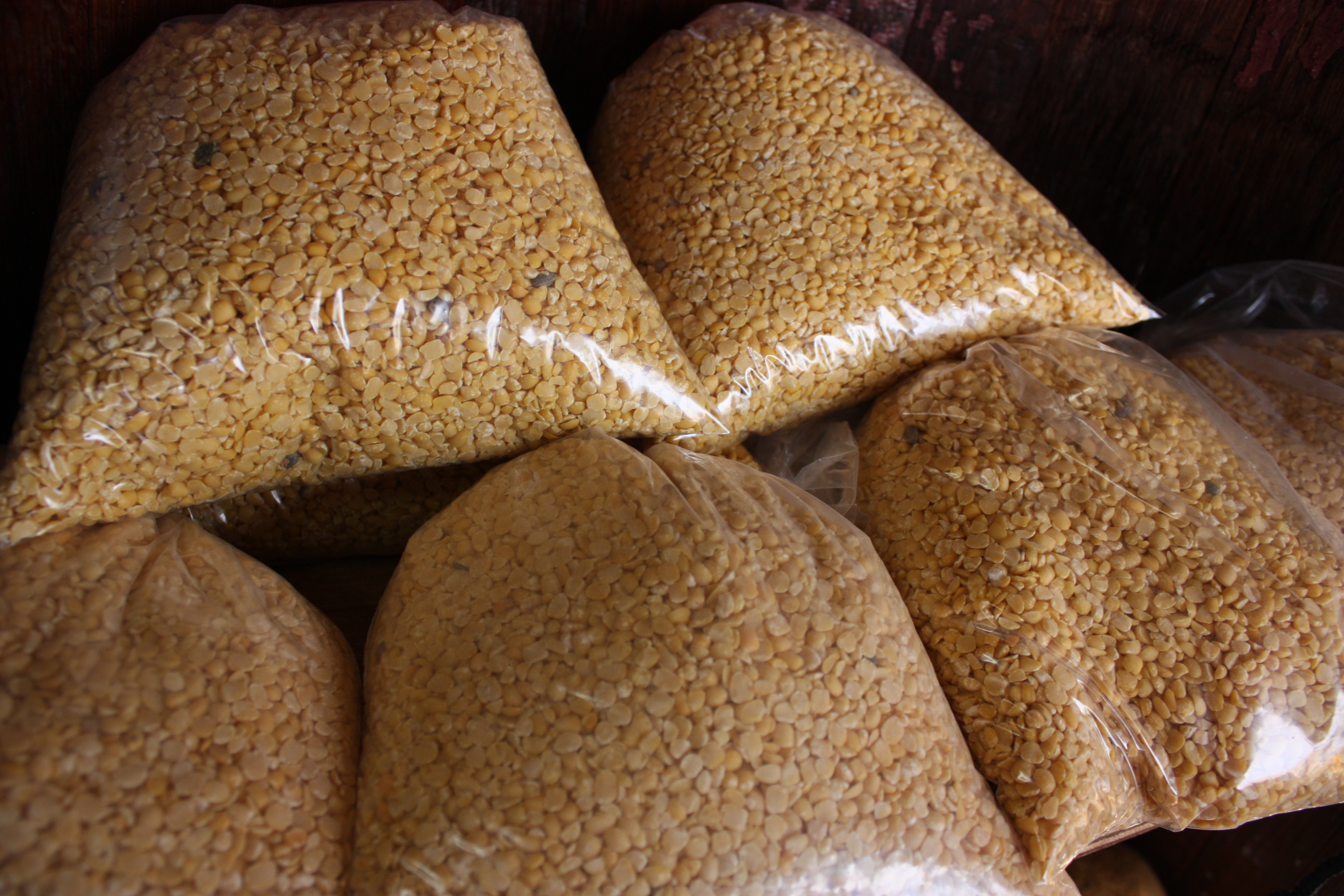
Fava Santorinis

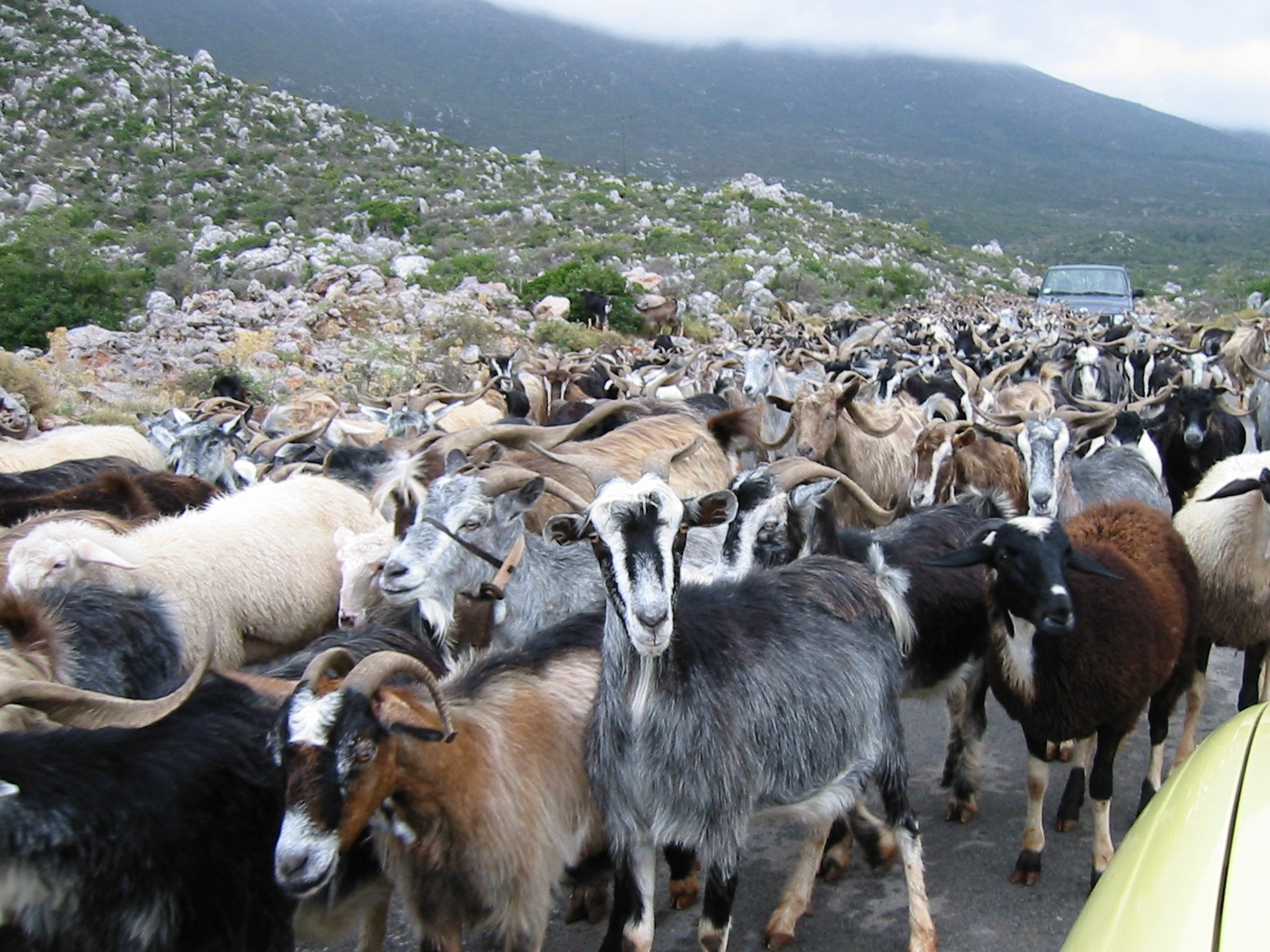
A herd of goats on the Greek highlands

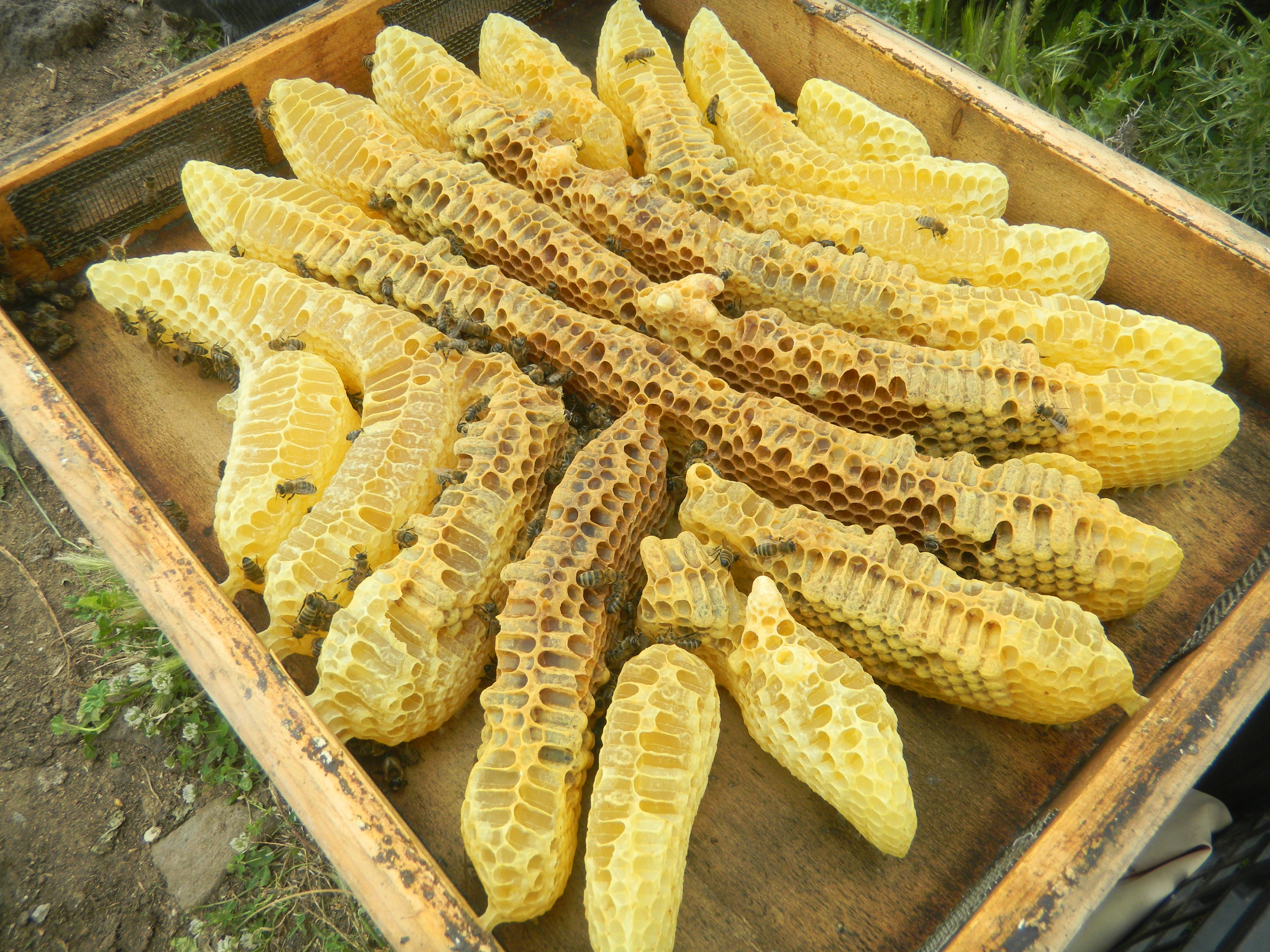
Beekeeping in Lesbos

== See also ==
- Greek cuisine
- Economy of Greece
- Greek wild olive varieties
