= Flufenoxuron =

Names
- Preferred IUPAC name N-({4-[2-Chloro-4-(trifluoromethyl)phenoxy]-2-fluorophenyl}carbamoyl)-2,6-difluorobenzamide

Identifiers
CAS Number	101463-69-8
3D model (JSmol)	Interactive image
ChEBI	CHEBI:39382
ChEMBL	ChEMBL2287680
ChemSpider	82863
DrugBank	DB15006
ECHA InfoCard	100.101.654
EC Number	417-680-3
KEGG	C18430
PubChem CID	91766
UNII	OD068OSS0N
CompTox Dashboard (EPA)	DTXSID1041978
- InChI: InChI=1S/C21H11ClF6N2O3/c22-12-8-10(21(26,27)28)4-7-17(12)33-11-5-6-16(15(25)9-11)29-20(32)30-19(31)18-13(23)2-1-3-14(18)24/h1-9H,(H2,29,30,31,32) Key: RYLHNOVXKPXDIP-UHFFFAOYSA-N
- SMILES: C1=CC(=C(C(=C1)F)C(=O)NC(=O)NC2=C(C=C(C=C2)OC3=C(C=C(C=C3)C(F)(F)F)Cl)F)F

Properties
Chemical formula	C_{21}H_{11}ClF_{6}N_{2}O_{3}
Molar mass	488.77 g·mol^{−1}
- Except where otherwise noted, data are given for materials in their standard state (at 25 °C [77 °F], 100 kPa). Infobox references

Flufenoxuron is an insecticide that belongs to the benzoylurea class, which also includes diflubenzuron, triflumuron, and lufenuron. It acts by inhibiting chitin synthase,

== Application ==
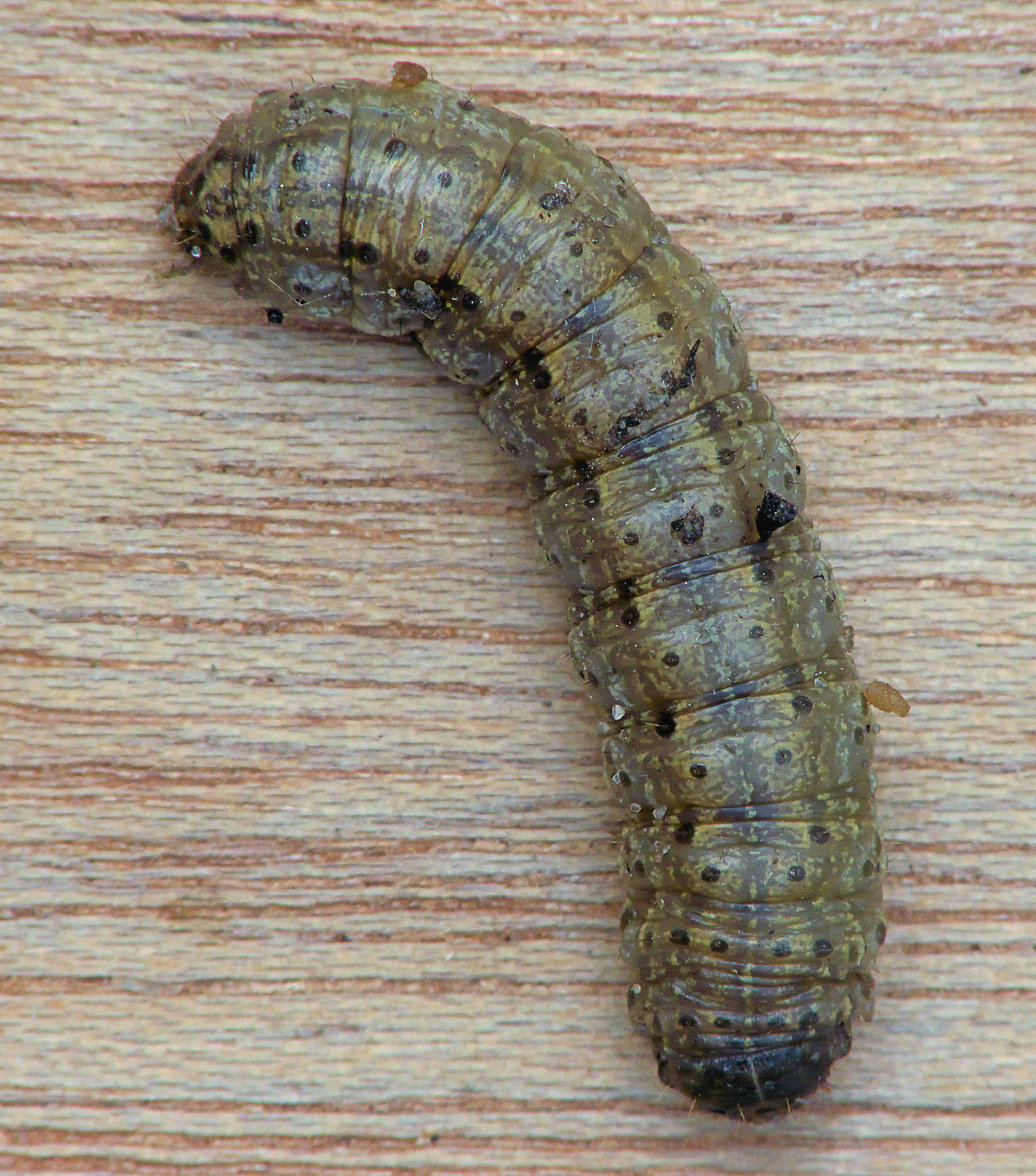
caterpillar of agrotis ipsilon

Flufenoxuron is used against mites and insect pests on pome fruit, vines, citrus, tea, cotton, maize, soya, vegetables and ornamentals.

== Synthesis ==
The multi-step synthesis of flufenoxuron is described in the following reaction sequence:

synthesis of flufenoxuron

== Trade name ==
flufenoxuron is marketed under the trade name Cascade (BASF) and Floxate (Mobedco).

== Authorization ==
Flufenoxuron was banned in the EU due to bioaccumulation. It was never registered in the US.

== Properties ==
Flufenoxuron is a white crystalline powder. It has low solubility in water, is not flammable, and is not an oxidizer.

== Toxicology and safety ==
Flufenoxuron toxicity to humans and other mammals is low, but it has a potentially high bioaccumulation in fish despite its low water solubility.
