= BPU =

BPU may refer to:

- Branch prediction unit, in computer science,
- Beppu airport, located in Beppu, Ōita on Kyūshū island, Japan.
- Birmingham Political Union, a political party in Great Britain during the 1830s.
- Biotic Processing Unit, a robotic biology cloud lab capable of carrying out remote-controlled experiments, part of a Stanford University "interactive biotechnology" project
- Bill Producing Unit, a humoristic and sarcastic description in internal slang for the youngest employees in a management consulting firm, which are usually with a customer for most of their work time, which is thus entirely billable to the client.
- BPU or N-Benzoyl-N'-phenylurea, a chemical compound.
- BPUs or benzoylurea insecticides, a class of chemical compounds.
