= C14H12N2O2 =

The molecular formula C_{14}H_{12}N_{2}O_{2} may refer to:

- Benzoylphenylurea
- N-Benzoyl-N′-phenylurea
- 1,4-Diamino-2,3-dihydroanthraquinone
- Dibenzoylhydrazine
