= Sfelinos =

Sfelinos Σφελινός
- Community
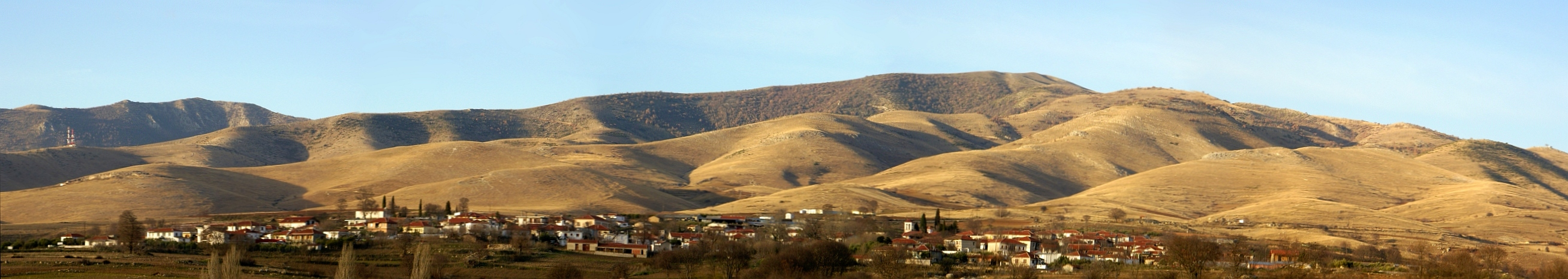
- Panorama of the village (click the image for better vision)

- Location within Greece
- Coordinates: 41°03′29″N 23°52′23″E
- Country: Greece
- Administrative region: Central Macedonia
- Regional unit: Serres
- Municipality: Nea Zichni
- Elevation: 430 m (1,410 ft)

Population (2021)
  - Community: 182
- Time zone: UTC+2 (EET)
  - Summer (DST): UTC+3 (EEST)
- Postal code: 62042
- Area code: 23240
- Website: sfelinos.weebly.com

Sfelinos (Greek: Σφελινός) is a village in the region of Serres, northern Greece. According to the 2021 Greek census, the village had 182 inhabitants.

== History ==
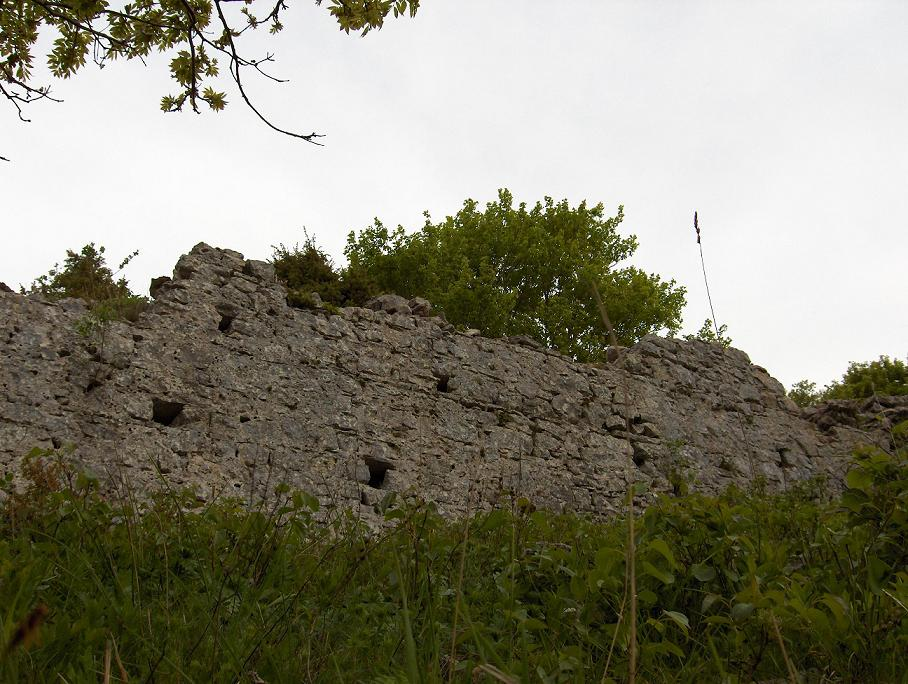
The ruins of the nearby Acropolis

There are Acropolis ruins dating to the times of Alexander the Great near the village. In the wider area of the settlement, ancient findindings and tombs with rich burials have been found. Especially on a tall and steep hill, known to the older inhabitants by the name of "Grandisnos", located about 4 km north of the village, parts of walls and foundations of an ancient castle are preserved.

In 1866, the village was known as "Sfilinon" and had 725 Greek inhabitants. According to the statistics of the Bulgarian geographer Vasil Kanchov, the village had 720 Christian Greek inhabitants by 1900. Its inhabitants are engaged in agriculture, with the principal cultivation of tobacco, cereals, almonds and olives, as well as animal husbandry. Hunting is practised in the area as well.

Historical population
Year	Pop.	±%
1961	821	—
2001	347	−57.7%
2011	304	−12.4%
2021	182	−40.1%
