= Eoreuma crawfordi =

Scientific classification
- Domain: Eukaryota
- Kingdom: Animalia
- Phylum: Arthropoda
- Class: Insecta
- Order: Lepidoptera
- Family: Crambidae
- Subfamily: Crambinae
- Tribe: Haimbachiini
- Genus: Eoreuma
- Species: E. crawfordi

Binomial name
- Eoreuma crawfordi Klots, 1970

Species of moth

Eoreuma crawfordi is a moth in the family Crambidae. It was described by Alexander Barrett Klots in 1970. It is found the United States, where it has been recorded from Iowa and Indiana.
