= Firiki Piliou =

Variety of miniature apple from Greece

Firiki Piliou (“Φιρίκι Πηλίου” in Greek) is a variety of miniature apples of the species Malus domestica Borkh, protected under a Protected Designation of Origin from Greece.

== Description ==
PDO Pelion apples covers a small, hilly area in the eastern part of mainland Greece, situated east of the coastal city of Volos. Its area coincides partially with that of PDO Volos olives, and it neighbours PDO Stylida olives to the northeast.

This region is characterized by a mild climate with cool summers, high humidity and slight seasonal variations in temperature. These conditions are suitable for growing apples, which tend to do best in temperate zones with cold winters, moderate summer temperatures and high levels of humidity.

This appellation covers apples of the Firiki variety. The trees start bearing fruit 6 years after planting and produce a crop once in every 2 years. To replace unproductive trees or create new orchards, producers use seedlings, grown from seeds, produced within the area of the appellation, or saplings, produced from grafting seedlings. The fruit is harvested by hand. All steps of the production process have to take place within the designated geographical area. Re-packing outside the area is permitted.

The apples are small to medium and have an elongated, cylindrical shape. The circumference of the fruit ranges between 14 and 18 centimeters. The skin is yellow-green with red tones, visible on the side that has been exposed to the sun. These apples have a juicy flesh, a high sugar content and low acidity levels.

It is believed that the Firiki apple variety originated in the Black Sea region. It has been grown in the foothills of Pelion since the 18th century.

== Pesticides ==
A 2014 study showed that samples of the apples contained flufenoxuron among other substances, which has a potential for bioaccumulation. “The presence of pesticide residues in PDO/PGI apples is not unexpected, since this labeling does not necessarily mean that such products are free of contaminants. Indeed, PDO/PGI labeling guarantees only the authenticity of products and their agricultural practice does not avoid the use of pesticides, as does organic farming practice.”
