= Noviflumuron =

Names
- IUPAC name N-[[3,5-Dichloro-2-fluoro-4-(1,1,2,3,3,3-hexafluoropropoxy)phenyl]carbamoyl]-2,6-difluorobenzamide

Identifiers
CAS Number	121451-02-3
3D model (JSmol)	Interactive image
ChEBI	CHEBI:39386
ChEMBL	ChEMBL1873307
ChemSpider	8004099
ECHA InfoCard	100.126.387
EC Number	601-779-5
KEGG	C18876
PubChem CID	9828359
UNII	E99C7TUW20
CompTox Dashboard (EPA)	DTXSID0034774
- InChI: InChI=1S/C17H7Cl2F9N2O3/c18-5-4-8(29-15(32)30-13(31)9-6(20)2-1-3-7(9)21)11(22)10(19)12(5)33-17(27,28)14(23)16(24,25)26/h1-4,14H,(H2,29,30,31,32) Key: YTYGAJLZOJPJGH-UHFFFAOYSA-N
- SMILES: C1=CC(=C(C(=C1)F)C(=O)NC(=O)NC2=CC(=C(C(=C2F)Cl)OC(C(C(F)(F)F)F)(F)F)Cl)F

Properties
Chemical formula	C_{17}H_{7}Cl_{2}F_{9}N_{2}O_{3}
Molar mass	529.14 g·mol^{−1}
- Except where otherwise noted, data are given for materials in their standard state (at 25 °C [77 °F], 100 kPa). Infobox references

Noviflumuron is an insecticide of the benzoylurea class. It is an insect growth regulator that prevents juvenile termites from developing into adults by disrupting the synthesis of chitin, the main component of an insect's exoskeleton.

Noviflumuron is primarily used in termite bait products such as Sentricon.
