= Eoreuma paranella =

Scientific classification
- Domain: Eukaryota
- Kingdom: Animalia
- Phylum: Arthropoda
- Class: Insecta
- Order: Lepidoptera
- Family: Crambidae
- Subfamily: Crambinae
- Tribe: Haimbachiini
- Genus: Eoreuma
- Species: E. paranella

Binomial name
- Eoreuma paranella Schaus, 1922

Species of moth

Eoreuma paranella is a moth in the family Crambidae. It was described by Schaus in 1922. It is found in Brazil (São Paulo).
