= Bistrifluron =

Names
- IUPAC name N-[[2-Chloro-3,5-bis(trifluoromethyl)phenyl]carbamoyl]-2,6-difluorobenzamide

Identifiers
CAS Number	201593-84-2
3D model (JSmol)	Interactive image
ChemSpider	8450933
ECHA InfoCard	100.118.415
EC Number	606-446-8
PubChem CID	10275455
UNII	0806M8CX7O
CompTox Dashboard (EPA)	DTXSID0058013
- InChI: InChI=1S/C16H7ClF8N2O2/c17-12-7(16(23,24)25)4-6(15(20,21)22)5-10(12)26-14(29)27-13(28)11-8(18)2-1-3-9(11)19/h1-5H,(H2,26,27,28,29) Key: YNKFZRGTXAPYFD-UHFFFAOYSA-N
- SMILES: C1=CC(=C(C(=C1)F)C(=O)NC(=O)NC2=CC(=CC(=C2Cl)C(F)(F)F)C(F)(F)F)F

Properties
Chemical formula	C_{16}H_{7}ClF_{8}N_{2}O_{2}
Molar mass	446.68 g·mol^{−1}
- Except where otherwise noted, data are given for materials in their standard state (at 25 °C [77 °F], 100 kPa). Infobox references

Bistrifluron is an insecticide of the benzoylurea class. It is used to control sucking as well as chewing insects such as aphids, whiteflies, caterpillars, and termites. It is not highly toxic to mammals, but bioaccumulation may be a concern. It has a low level of toxicity to birds and moderate to high toxicity to most aquatic animals, honeybees, and earthworms.
