= Sentricon =

Subterranean termite pest control product

The Sentricon Termite Colony Elimination System is a subterranean termite pest control product developed and manufactured by Corteva (Previously Dow AgroSciences). It was introduced in 1995 as a termite baiting system and an alternative to liquid termicide soil barriers. It eliminates all members of the termite colony, including those of the Formosan subterranean termite colonies.

== Operation ==
The baiting technique employed by the Sentricon System takes advantage of termite biology and behavior. Subterranean worker termites forage for cellulose food sources 24 hours a day, ranging abroad from their underground nest, or colony, through tunnels in the soil that can extend up to 300 feet or more. When worker termites find a food source, they leave a pheromone scent trail to summon nest mates. Worker termites chew and digest cellulose, and then regurgitate it to share with other termites in the colony.

Sentricon bait stations are installed in the soil, creating a protective perimeter around a property. These stations are baited with a cellulose material impregnated with noviflumuron, a chitin synthesis inhibitor. When foraging, worker termites find the stations, eat the bait material, and then regurgitate it for colony nest mates to consume. Termites affected by noviflumuron later die as the compound inhibits molting and is its effects are inconspicuous to termites as to where it originates. As termites within the colony die, the colony is eliminated, typically over a period of months. Noviflumuron bait treatment requires less disruption of buildings and surroundings than traditional methods based on creating a barrier of termicide-treated soil around the structure to be protected, but noviflumuron bait treatment also needs to be continued indefinitely to prevent re-infestation in areas where termites are endemic.

In 2000, the Sentricon System received the Presidential Green Chemistry Challenge Award, an environmental honor from the U.S. government.

== Effectiveness ==
Sentricon has been extensively tested. Multiple independent research studies have shown that its bait matrix and baiting technique is an effective termite control option. Field evaluations have documented the elimination of subterranean termite activity, including that of Formosan subterranean termites, often within 3 to 6 months. Ongoing monitoring and re-baiting is critical to termite colony elimination. Without proper oversight, re-infestation from neighboring foraging colonies can occur. However, such re-infestations have not included any members of the original colony. Long-term studies have shown that by implementing the recommended service frequency, approximately 60% of the colonies are eliminated during the first quarter, approximately 75% of the colonies are eliminated after the second quarter, and nearly all colonies are eliminated within a year of the initial baiting, with all colonies ultimately being eliminated. According to the Dow AgroSciences, Sentricon is used by organisations that include Independence Hall, the Statue of Liberty, and the White House
