= Eoreuma arenella =

Scientific classification
- Domain: Eukaryota
- Kingdom: Animalia
- Phylum: Arthropoda
- Class: Insecta
- Order: Lepidoptera
- Family: Crambidae
- Subfamily: Crambinae
- Tribe: Haimbachiini
- Genus: Eoreuma
- Species: E. arenella

Binomial name
- Eoreuma arenella A. Blanchard & Knudson, 1983

Species of moth

Eoreuma arenella is a moth in the family Crambidae. It was described by André Blanchard and Edward C. Knudson in 1983. It is found in North America, where it has been recorded from Texas.
