= Milbemycin oxime/lufenuron =

Combination drug

Combination of
- Milbemycin oxime: Endectocide
- Lufenuron: Ectoparasiticide

Clinical data
- AHFS/Drugs.com: FDA Professional Drug Information

Identifiers
- CAS Number: 182005-62-5

The combination milbemycin oxime/lufenuron (trade names Sentinel Flavor Tabs, by Novartis Animal Health, and Program plus) is a parasite control drug in which the active ingredient, milbemycin oxime, eliminates worms, while a second active ingredient, lufenuron, arrests the development of eggs and larvae, preventing them from maturing and continuing the infestation of an animal. This combination is registered for animal use only. To achieve efficacy, the treatment is administered once monthly, together with food, in a dosage suitable for the weight of the affected animal. The usual ratio is 500 μg milbemycin oxime and 10 mg lufenuron/kg body weight. Novartis indicates the proper dosage by color-coding the packages.

Several 2002 studies by Novartis demonstrate that milbemycin oxime/lufenuron compares favorably to some other treatments, such as the moxidectin injection. The combination is considered effective in the elimination of fleas, and the prevention of infection from hookworm (Ancylostoma caninum), heartworm (Dirofilaria immitis), roundworms, whipworms (Trichuris vulpis), and ascarids (Toxocara canis and Toxascaris leonina). The USA FDA approval for Sentinel says "Concurrent use of insecticides may be necessary". It is the concurrent use of Sentinel and nitenpyram (Capstar) that has an FDA-approved indication "to kill adult fleas".

== Side effects ==
Milbemycin oxime/lufenuron can lead to a negative physical response in some animals, most severely those that have heartworm disease or weigh under 2 lbs. It is recommended that all dogs be tested for heartworm prior to taking the medication to minimize this risk. Serious side effects may include lethargy, weakness, stumbling, seizures, coma, excessive drooling, and wide dilated pupils. Less serious side effects are an upset stomach or loss of appetite, various skin irritations, and mood changes.
