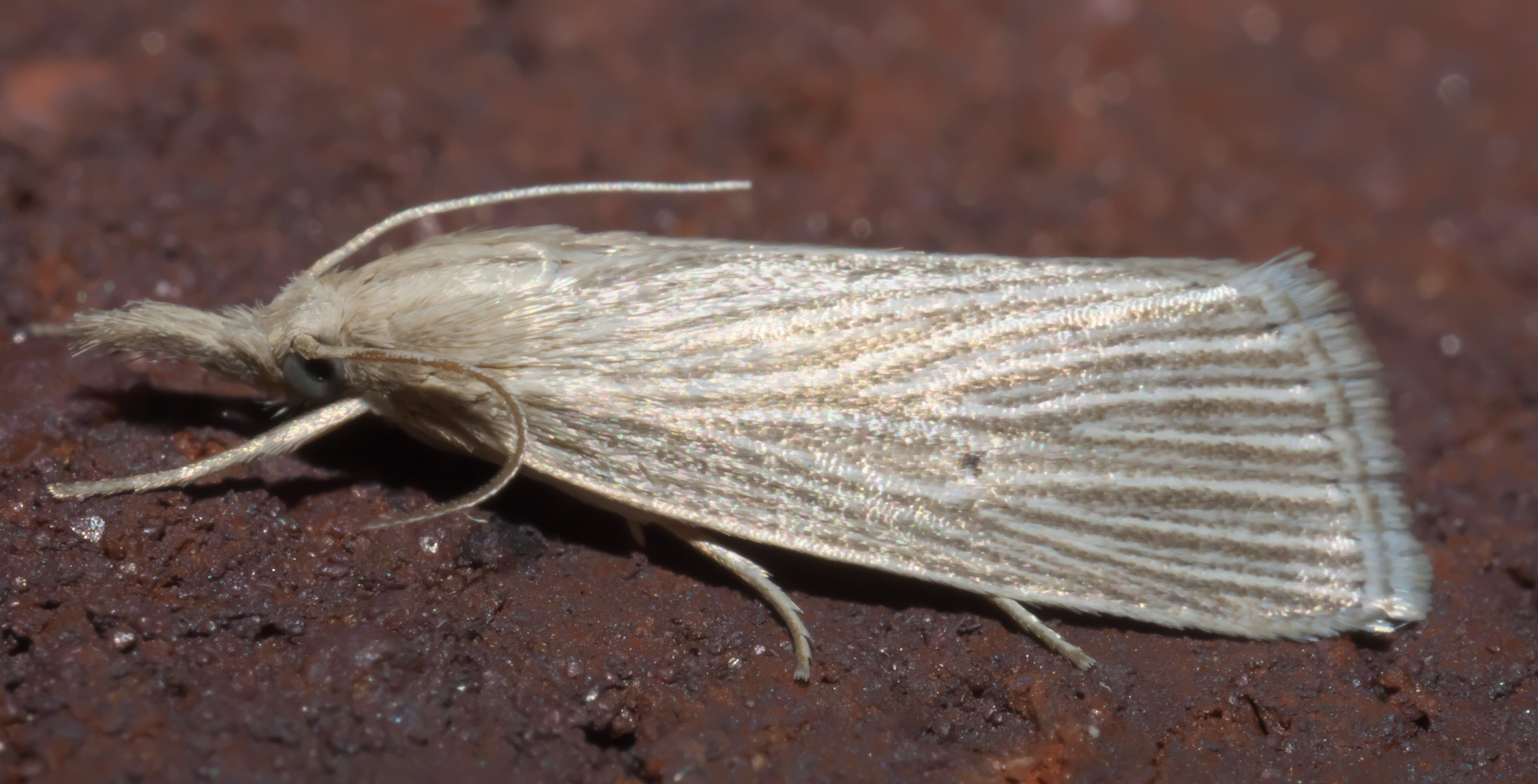

Scientific classification
- Kingdom: Animalia
- Phylum: Arthropoda
- Clade: Pancrustacea
- Class: Insecta
- Order: Lepidoptera
- Family: Crambidae
- Subfamily: Crambinae
- Tribe: Haimbachiini
- Genus: Eoreuma
- Species: E. densellus

Binomial name
- Eoreuma densellus (Zeller, 1881)

Synonyms
- Chilo densellus Zeller, 1881; Eoreuma densella

= Eoreuma densellus =

Species of moth

Eoreuma densellus, commonly known as the wainscot grass-veneer, is a species of moth in the family Crambidae. It was first described by Zeller in 1881. It is found in North America, where it has been recorded from Minnesota to Connecticut, south to Texas and Florida.

Adults are on wing from April to October in most of the range, but year round in Florida. The average length is 12.5 mm.
