= Vigilante (insecticide) =

Brand of agricultural insecticide

Vigilante was an insecticide used with both dairy and beef cattle to reduce the number of flies in an agricultural area. It was usually formatted as a 50-gram bolus containing 9.7% diflubenzuron, an insect growth regulator which inhibits the formation of chitin and prevents insects from reproducing. The bolus was administered via balling gun. It was effective in reducing populations of horn flies and face flies for approximately 10–16 weeks. It was best used as part of an integrated pest management program in combination with other fly-control methods such as insecticidal tags, backrubbers, and periodic spraying.

Vigilante was originally produced by American Cyanamid, and was the first larvicide marketed as a bolus. After the breakup of American Cyanamid, Vigilante was manufactured by Uniroyal Chemical and then by Chemtura. Chemtura was taken over by Lanxness in 2017. Lanxness does not sell Vigilante. Online searching in 2026 for the insecticide Vigilante uncovered no-one selling this product. It is assumed to be discontinued.

Other product containing diflubenzuron for feed-through control of flies are Clarifly (Central Garden & Pet) and JustiFly (Champion). They are in the form of a powder and not a bolus.
