= Eoreuma callista =

Scientific classification
- Domain: Eukaryota
- Kingdom: Animalia
- Phylum: Arthropoda
- Class: Insecta
- Order: Lepidoptera
- Family: Crambidae
- Subfamily: Crambinae
- Tribe: Haimbachiini
- Genus: Eoreuma
- Species: E. callista

Binomial name
- Eoreuma callista Klots, 1970

Species of moth

Eoreuma callista is a moth in the family Crambidae. It was described by Alexander Barrett Klots in 1970. It is found in North America, where it has been recorded from Arizona and New Mexico.

The wingspan is about 22 mm. Adults are on wing from July to August.
