= Eoreuma multipunctellus =

Scientific classification
- Domain: Eukaryota
- Kingdom: Animalia
- Phylum: Arthropoda
- Class: Insecta
- Order: Lepidoptera
- Family: Crambidae
- Subfamily: Crambinae
- Tribe: Haimbachiini
- Genus: Eoreuma
- Species: E. multipunctellus

Binomial name
- Eoreuma multipunctellus (Kearfott, 1908)

Synonyms
- Chilo multipunctellus Kearfott, 1908; Eoreuma multipunctella

Species of moth

Eoreuma multipunctellus is a moth in the family Crambidae. It was described by William D. Kearfott in 1908. It has been recorded from the US state of Arizona.
