= Eoreuma morbidellus =

Scientific classification
- Kingdom: Animalia
- Phylum: Arthropoda
- Class: Insecta
- Order: Lepidoptera
- Family: Crambidae
- Subfamily: Crambinae
- Tribe: Haimbachiini
- Genus: Eoreuma
- Species: E. morbidellus

Binomial name
- Eoreuma morbidellus (Dyar, 1913)

Synonyms
- Chilo morbidellus Dyar, 1913

Species of moth

Eoreuma morbidellus is a moth in the family Crambidae. It was described by Harrison Gray Dyar Jr. in 1913. It is found in Guyana.
