= Eoreuma =

Scientific classification
- Domain: Eukaryota
- Kingdom: Animalia
- Phylum: Arthropoda
- Class: Insecta
- Order: Lepidoptera
- Family: Crambidae
- Subfamily: Crambinae
- Tribe: Haimbachiini
- Genus: Eoreuma; Ely, 1910

Genus of moths

Eoreuma is a genus of moths of the family Crambidae.

== Species ==
- Eoreuma arenella A. Blanchard & Knudson, 1983
- Eoreuma callista Klots, 1970
- Eoreuma confederata Klots, 1970
- Eoreuma crawfordi Klots, 1970
- Eoreuma densellus (Zeller, 1881)
- Eoreuma donzella Schaus, 1922
- Eoreuma evae Klots, 1970
- Eoreuma loftini (Dyar, 1917)
- Eoreuma morbidellus (Dyar, 1913)
- Eoreuma multipunctellus (Kearfott, 1908)
- Eoreuma paranella Schaus, 1922
