= N-Benzoyl-N'-phenylurea =

N-Benzoyl-N′-phenylurea

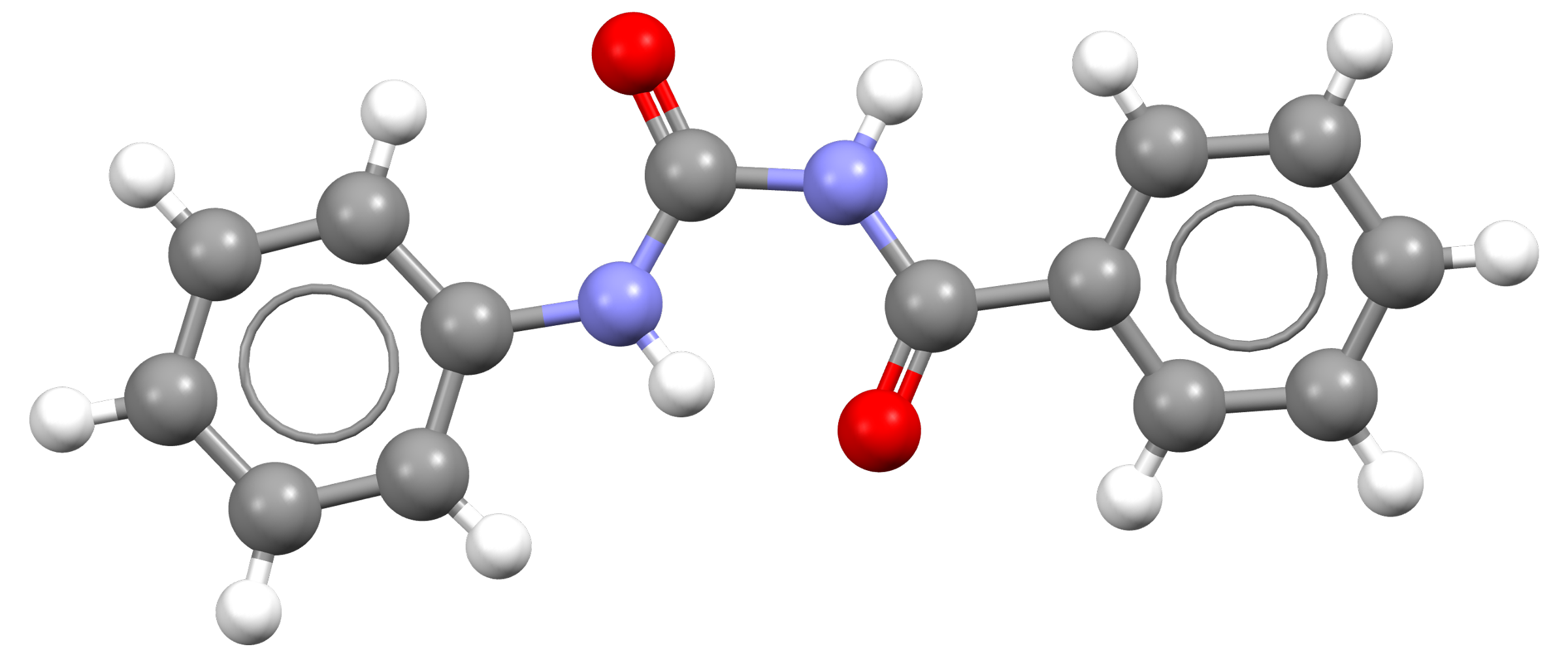

Names
- Preferred IUPAC name N-(Phenylcarbamoyl)benzamide
- Other names: 1-Benzoyl-3-phenylurea; BPU

Identifiers
| CAS Number | 1821-33-6 |
| 3D model (JSmol) | Interactive image |
| ChemSpider | 67144 |
| PubChem CID | 74566 |
| UNII | LBT1P8UZ0G |
| CompTox Dashboard (EPA) | DTXSID80171247 |
- InChI: InChI=1S/C14H12N2O2/c17-13(11-7-3-1-4-8-11)16-14(18)15-12-9-5-2-6-10-12/h1-10H,(H2,15,16,17,18) Key: ZWYSLPOHOBPSLC-UHFFFAOYSA-N
- SMILES: O=C(NC(Nc1ccccc1)=O)c2ccccc2

Properties
| Chemical formula | C_{14}H_{12}N_{2}O_{2} |
| Molar mass | 240.262 g·mol^{−1} |
| Appearance | White crystals |
| Density | 1.259 g cm^{−3} |
| Melting point | 210 to 213 °C (410 to 415 °F; 483 to 486 K) |
| Refractive index (n_{D}) | 1.644 |

Structure
| Crystal structure | monoclinic |
| Space group | P2_{1}/c, No. 14 |
| Lattice constant | a = 15.5641(8) Å, b = 4.6564(3) Å, c = 21.1029(15) Å α = 90°, β = 128.716°, γ = 90° |
- Except where otherwise noted, data are given for materials in their standard state (at 25 °C [77 °F], 100 kPa). Infobox references

N-Benzoyl-N′-phenylurea (BPU) consists of a urea core with a benzoyl amide on one nitrogen and a phenyl group on the other. It is the parent compound of the benzoylurea class of molecules, several of which are commercially useful insecticides, although N-benzoyl-N′-phenylurea itself is not known to have insecticidal properties.

== Structure and bonding ==
Structure of N-benzoyl-N′-phenylurea was first determined in 2010. Molecules in this compound are approximately flat and exhibit high charge delocalization. Within the molecule an intramolecular N−H⋅⋅⋅O hydrogen bond is present forming pseudoaromatic 6-membered ring. Additionally intermolecular N−H⋅⋅⋅O hydrogen bonds are also present combining two molecules into a centrosymmetric dimer (8-membered ring is formed).

Carbonyl C=O bond distances are equal to ca. 1.23 Å, C−N distances are in range of 1.34 to 1.41 Å.

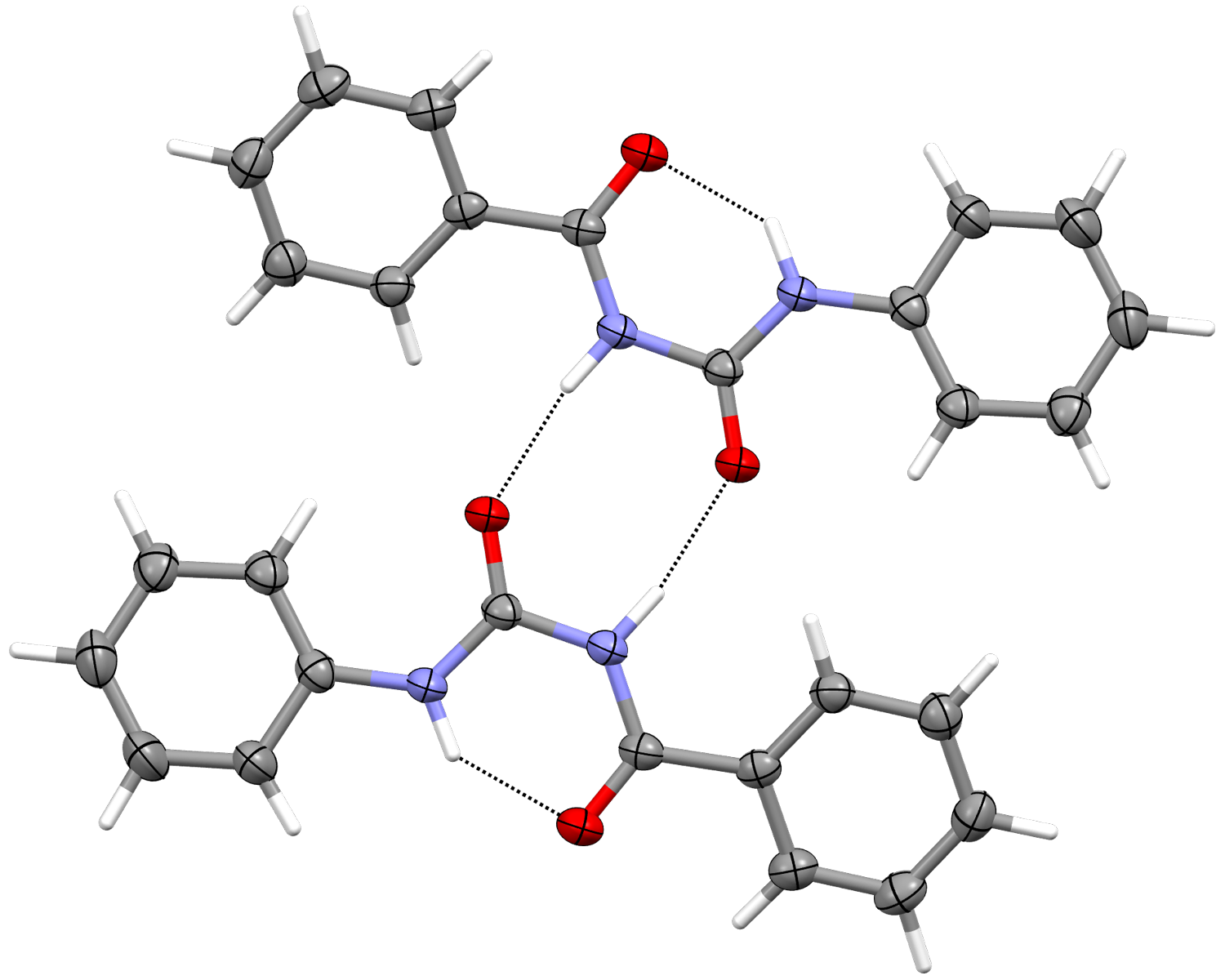
Centrosymmetric dimer found in crystal structure of N-Benzoyl-N′-phenylurea

== Synthesis ==
In 1965 N-benzoyl-N′-phenylurea was synthesized when dry N-chlorobenzamide was reacted with phenylisocyanate or refluxed in dry benzene with anhydrous potassium fluoride. Alternatively N-benzoyl-N′-phenylurea was synthesized in 2010 by hydrolysis of N-benzoyl-N′-phenylthiourea.

== Applications ==
Benzoylphenylureas (BPUs) were first identified in the 1970s as insecticides. These compounds disrupt molting and development, making them useful as insect growth regulators. BPUs such as lufenuron and diflubenzuron are commonly used for pest control due to their selectivity and low toxicity to vertebrates.
