= Eoreuma loftini =

Scientific classification
- Domain: Eukaryota
- Kingdom: Animalia
- Phylum: Arthropoda
- Class: Insecta
- Order: Lepidoptera
- Family: Crambidae
- Subfamily: Crambinae
- Tribe: Haimbachiini
- Genus: Eoreuma
- Species: E. loftini

Binomial name
- Eoreuma loftini (Dyar, 1917)

Synonyms
- Chilo loftini Dyar, 1917; Chilo opinionellus Dyar, 1917

Species of moth

Eoreuma loftini, the Mexican rice borer, is a moth in the family Crambidae. It was described by Harrison Gray Dyar Jr. in 1917. It is found in the southern United States, where it has been recorded from California, Arizona, Texas, Louisiana and Florida. It is also found in Mexico.

The wingspan is about 12 mm.
