= Rodi Ermionis =

Type of Greek pomegranate

Rodi Ermionis (Greek: Ρόδι Ερμιόνης) is a pomegranate, fruit of the Ermioni pomegranate tree, a local variety grown in the Ermionida area in the Peloponnese, Greece, which has been granted a Protected Designation of Origin designation.

== Description ==
The ripe fruit has a round shape with a thin, fleshy, elastic and shiny skin, with the inside having arils that contain a soft, medium-sized, semi-woody seed that breaks easily with chewing. The peel varies from pale yellow-pink to red (depending on the surface exposed to the sun) while the arils vary from pink to red. The Rodi Ermionis PDO can be applied to both the fresh fruit or to the hulled and packaged arils.

This type of pomegranate has been grown in Ermioni for decades. "The fruit is harvested very carefully and always manually, either using special secateurs or by hand, because 'Rodi Ermionis' has a soft, fine skin that is easily bruised. This reduces the risk of damage and post-harvest infestation and ensures fruit of a higher quality."

== Production ==
Production of the fruit has increased in the 21st century from 1,600 ha (4,000 acres) in 2007 to 4,000 ha (10,000 acres) in 2014, and is of great economic interest for the country.
