= Triflumuron =

Names
- Preferred IUPAC name 2-Chloro-N-{[4-(trifluoromethoxy)phenyl]carbamoyl}benzamide
- Other names Alsystin

Identifiers
CAS Number	64628-44-0
3D model (JSmol)	Interactive image
Beilstein Reference	2776684
ChEBI	CHEBI:39388
ChEMBL	ChEMBL1394379
ChemSpider	43172
ECHA InfoCard	100.059.055
EC Number	264-980-3
KEGG	C18615
PubChem CID	47445
UNII	3FT64DYG8K
CompTox Dashboard (EPA)	DTXSID5034355
- InChI: InChI=1S/C15H10ClF3N2O3/c16-12-4-2-1-3-11(12)13(22)21-14(23)20-9-5-7-10(8-6-9)24-15(17,18)19/h1-8H,(H2,20,21,22,23) Key: XAIPTRIXGHTTNT-UHFFFAOYSA-N
- SMILES: C1=CC=C(C(=C1)C(=O)NC(=O)NC2=CC=C(C=C2)OC(F)(F)F)Cl

Properties
Chemical formula	C_{15}H_{10}ClF_{3}N_{2}O_{3}
Molar mass	358.70 g·mol^{−1}

Hazards
- GHS labelling
Pictograms	(GHS08: Health hazard)
Signal word	Danger
Hazard statements	H330
Precautionary statements	P260, P271, P284, P304+P340, P310, P320, P403+P233, P405, P501
- Except where otherwise noted, data are given for materials in their standard state (at 25 °C [77 °F], 100 kPa). Infobox references

Triflumuron is the active ingredient in some IGRs (insect growth regulators). An aromatic ether, organofluorine compound from the benzoylurea class and a member of monochlorobenzenes.

Triflumuron is banned in the European Union.
