= Benzoylurea insecticide =

Class of insecticide

Chemical structure of diflubenzuron, a commonly used benzoylurea insecticide

Benzoylureas (BPUs) are chemical derivatives of N-benzoyl-N′-phenylurea, which are used as insecticides. They do not directly kill the insect, but disrupt moulting and egg hatch, and thus act as insect growth regulators. They act by inhibiting chitin synthase, preventing the formation of chitin in the insect's body.

The insecticidal activity of the BPUs was discovered serendipitiously at Phillips-Duphar who commercialised diflubenzuron in 1975. Since then, many BPUs were commercialised by many companies. BPUs accounted for 3% of the $ 18.4 billion world insecticide market in 2018. Lufenuron, was the largest selling BPU in 2016, selling for $ 112 million.

BPUs are active against many types of insect pests, (e.g. lepidoptera coleoptera, diptera) in agriculture, as well as being used against termites and animal health pests such as fleas.

The Insecticide Resistance Action Committee (IRAC) lists the following BPUs, which are classified in IRAC group 15: bistrifluron, chlorfluazuron, diflubenzuron, flucycloxuron, flufenoxuron, hexaflumuron, lufenuron, novaluron, noviflumuron, teflubenzuron, and triflumuron. Many older BPUs are no longer in use.

== Mammalian and environmental toxicity ==
BPUs have a good mammalian tox profile. Diflubenzuron is considered to be of very low acute toxicity, and is approved by the WHO for treatment of drinking water as a mosquito larvicide.

BPUs have low acute toxicity against bees, low to moderate toxicity to fish, but high toxicity to aquatic invertebrates and crustaceans.

BPUs have various rates of degradation in the environment. Some older BPUs have high persistence and are no longer sold. Flufenoxuron was shown to bioaccumulate and was banned in the EU in 2011.
