= Patrinia olive =

Edible fruit cultivar

Patrinia

Olive (Olea europaea)
- Origin: Greece
- Notable regions: Farres, Aigialeia
- Use: Oil
- Oil content: High

Patrinia olive (Olea europaea var. microphylla) is a Greek variety of olive tree grown primarily in Aigialeia, Greece. It is also a native variety in the region of Chalandritsa and nearby villages. The olive fruit is used exclusively for oil production and it has a high oil concentration of around 25%. The number of the cultivated Patrinia trees is no more than 6 million and it makes up 4% of the Greek olive trees (140 million).

== Synonyms ==
Patrinia olive tree is also known as Koutsourelia or Lianolia.

== Characteristics ==
Patrinia olive tree is of average size (3m height) and it prefers average or rich composition soil. The leaves are small and narrow, a distinctive characteristic of this variety. The fruit is rich and produces high quality olive oil, ripening between November and December. Patrinia is thriving on the amphitheatrically situated hilly areas of Aigialeia and the produced olive oil is distinguished by its quality and its mild fruity aromas.
