= Diflubenzuron =

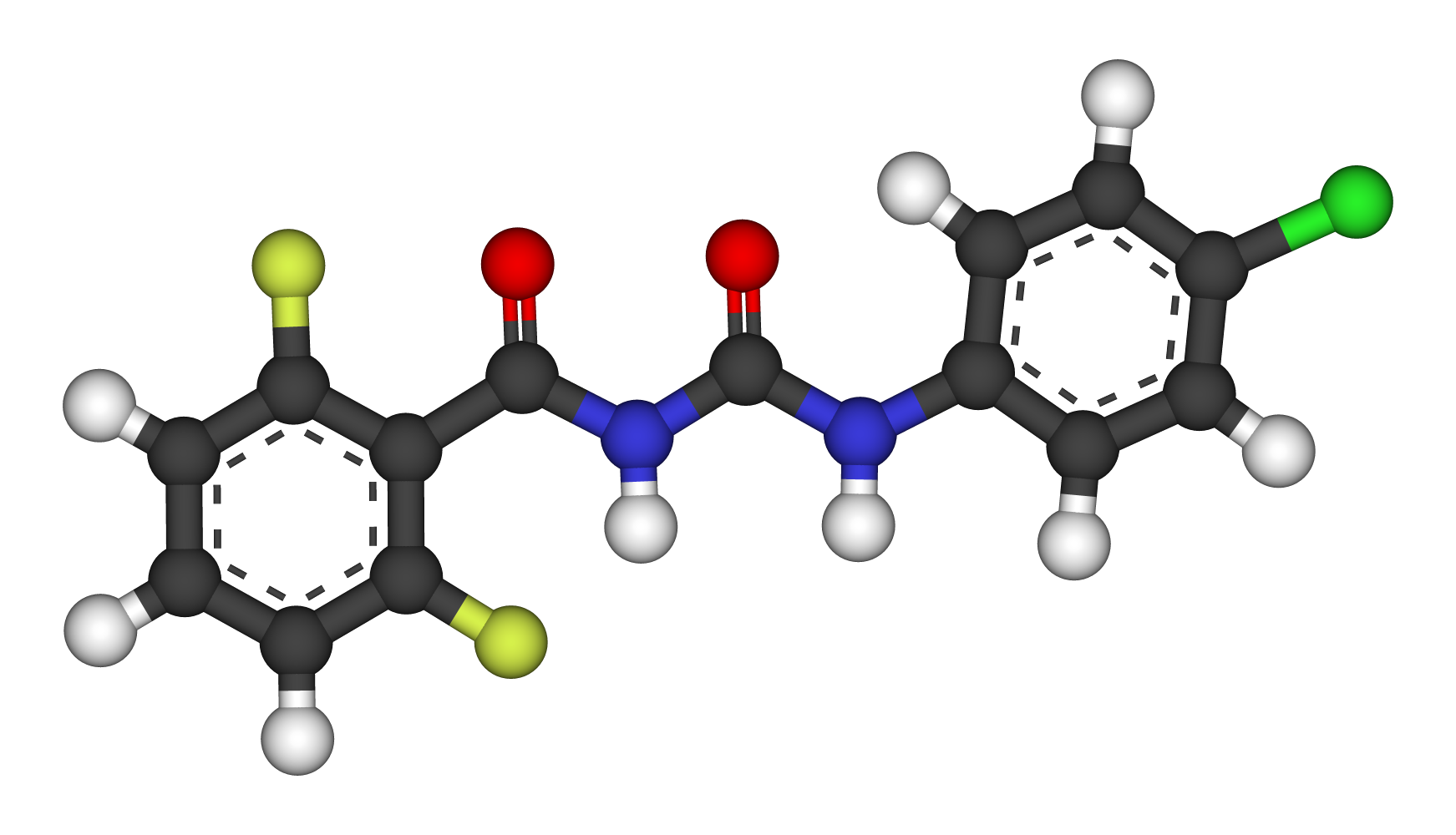

Names
- Preferred IUPAC name N-[(4-Chlorophenyl)carbamoyl]-2,6-difluorobenzamide
- Other names Dimilin

Identifiers
CAS Number	35367-38-5
3D model (JSmol)	Interactive image
ChEBI	CHEBI:34703
ChEMBL	ChEMBL49338
ChemSpider	34065
ECHA InfoCard	100.047.740
KEGG	C14427
PubChem CID	37123
UNII	J76U6ZSI8D
CompTox Dashboard (EPA)	DTXSID1024049
- InChI: InChI=1S/C14H9ClF2N2O2/c15-8-4-6-9(7-5-8)18-14(21)19-13(20)12-10(16)2-1-3-11(12)17/h1-7H,(H2,18,19,20,21) Key: QQQYTWIFVNKMRW-UHFFFAOYSA-N
- SMILES: Clc2ccc(NC(=O)NC(=O)c1c(F)cccc1F)cc2

Properties
Chemical formula	C_{14}H_{9}ClF_{2}N_{2}O_{2}
Molar mass	310.68 g·mol^{−1}
Solubility in water	0.08 mg/L
Solubility in other solvents	DMSO: 12 g/100 g Acetone 0.615 g/100 g Methanol: 0.09 g/100 g

Pharmacology
ATCvet code	QP53BC02 (WHO)
- Except where otherwise noted, data are given for materials in their standard state (at 25 °C [77 °F], 100 kPa). verify (what is ?) Infobox references

Diflubenzuron is an insecticide of the benzoylurea class. It is used in forest management and on field crops to selectively control insect pests, particularly forest tent caterpillar moths, boll weevils, gypsy moths, and other types of moths. It is a widely used larvicide in India for control of mosquito larvae by public health authorities. Diflubenzuron is recommended by the WHO Pesticide Evaluation Scheme for use against mosquitos.

== Mechanism of action ==
The mechanism of action of diflubenzuron involves inhibiting the production of chitin which is used by an insect to build its exoskeleton. It triggers insect larvae to molt early without a properly formed exoskeleton, resulting in the death of the larvae.

== Mammalian toxicity ==
Diflubenzuron has been evaluated by the United States Environmental Protection Agency (EPA), and it is classified as non-carcinogenic. 4-Chloroaniline, a metabolite of diflubenzuron which has been classified as a carcinogen, is produced after diflubenzuron has been ingested. The small amount converted to 4-chloroaniline after ingestion is not sufficient to cause cancer.

== Commercial uses ==
Diflubenzuron is used in many products for various purposes.

Dimilin was the first product sold with diflubenzuron as active ingredient. It is still sold as wettable powder (WP-25 ) and various concentrations as suspension concentrate (SC). It is used on a wide variety of crops and target insects.

Micromite (UPL corporation) is sold in two formulations: water dispersible granules (WGS) containing 80% diflubenzuron, and an emulsifiable concentrate (EC) containing 22% diflubenzuron. It is used on a wide variety of crops and target insects.

Adept (OHP, Inc.) is sold as a 25% wettable powder (WP) formulation for ornamental crops in greenhouses. It is used for the control of fungus gnats, shore flies, armyworms, leafminers and suppression of whiteflies.

Device (Arysta LifeScience) for vector control.

Clarifly (Central Garden & Pet) and JustiFly (Champion). are feed-through cattle treatments to control horn flies and face flies. Vigilante, formulated as a bolus for this purposeis no longer sold.
