= Lufenuron =

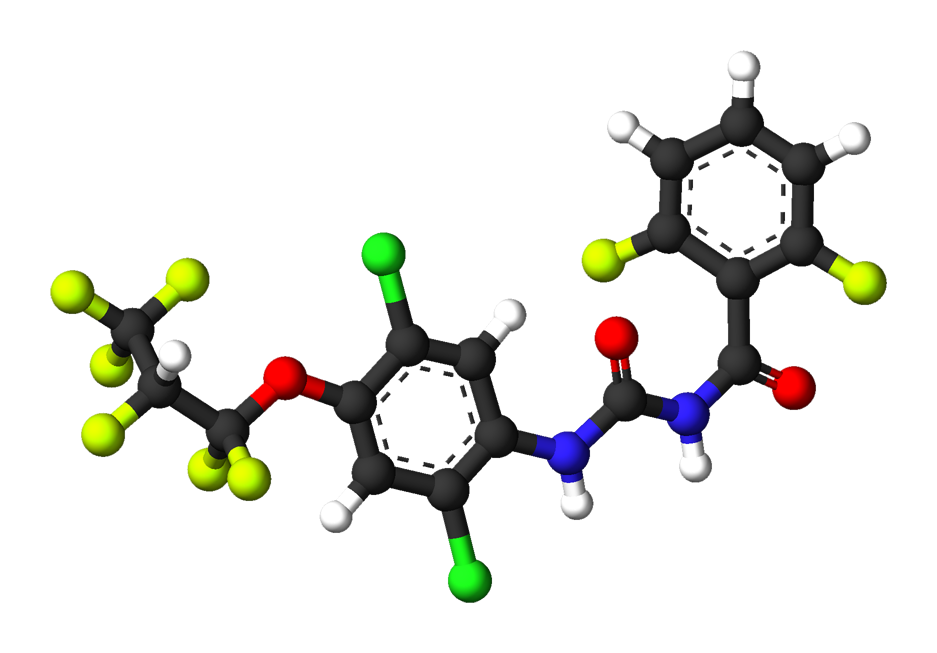

Names
- IUPAC name 1-[2,5-Dichloro-4-(1,1,2,3,3,3-hexafluoropropoxy)phenyl]-3-(2,6-difluorobenzoyl)urea
- Other names N-[[[2,5-Dichloro-4-(1,1,2,3,3,3-hexafluoropropoxy)phenyl]amino]carbonyl]-2,6-difluorobenzamide; Fluphenacur; U.S. EPA PC Code: 118205

Identifiers
CAS Number	103055-07-8
3D model (JSmol)	Interactive image
ChEBI	CHEBI:39384
ChEMBL	ChEMBL1364906
ChemSpider	64813
ECHA InfoCard	100.101.025
KEGG	D08150
PubChem CID	71777
UNII	1R754M4918
CompTox Dashboard (EPA)	DTXSID5034357
- InChI: InChI=1S/C17H8Cl2F8N2O3/c18-6-5-11(32-17(26,27)14(22)16(23,24)25)7(19)4-10(6)28-15(31)29-13(30)12-8(20)2-1-3-9(12)21/h1-5,14H,(H2,28,29,30,31) Key: PWPJGUXAGUPAHP-UHFFFAOYSA-N; InChI=1/C17H8Cl2F8N2O3/c18-6-5-11(32-17(26,27)14(22)16(23,24)25)7(19)4-10(6)28-15(31)29-13(30)12-8(20)2-1-3-9(12)21/h1-5,14H,(H2,28,29,30,31) Key: PWPJGUXAGUPAHP-UHFFFAOYAQ
- SMILES: Clc1cc(c(Cl)cc1OC(F)(F)C(F)C(F)(F)F)NC(=O)NC(=O)c2c(F)cccc2F

Properties
Chemical formula	C_{17}H_{8}Cl_{2}F_{8}N_{2}O_{3}
Molar mass	511.15 g·mol^{−1}
Melting point	174 °C (345 °F; 447 K)

Pharmacology
ATCvet code	QP53BC01 (WHO)
- Except where otherwise noted, data are given for materials in their standard state (at 25 °C [77 °F], 100 kPa). verify (what is ?) Infobox references

Lufenuron is a chemical with insecticidal properties, belonging to the class of insecticides called insect growth regulators. It is a chitin synthesis inhibitor belonging to the benzoylurea class (IRAC group 15).

== Applications ==
=== Veterinary ===
Lufenuron is one of the two active ingredients in the flea, heartworm, and anthelmintic medicine milbemycin oxime/lufenuron (Sentinel). It was also the active ingredient in the previously-marketed veterinary flea control medication Program.

Lufenuron is stored in the animal's body fat and transferred to adult fleas through the host's blood when they feed. Adult fleas transfer it to their growing eggs through their blood, and to hatched larvae feeding on their excrement. It does not kill adult fleas.

Lufenuron inhibits the production of chitin in insects. Without chitin, a larval flea will never develop a hard outer shell (exoskeleton). With its inner organs exposed to air, the insect dies from dehydration soon after hatching or molting (shedding its old, smaller shell).

Lufenuron is also used to fight fungal infections, since fungus cell walls are about one third chitin.

=== Agriculture ===
Lufenuron is also sold as an agricultural pesticide for use against lepidopterans, eriophyid mites, and western flower thrips. It is an effective antifungal in plants.
